= Tourism in Honduras =

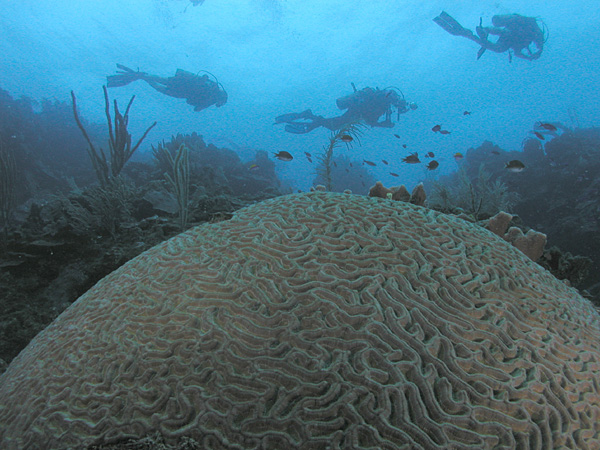
Divers in Roatán Island, Bay Islands, Caribbean Sea

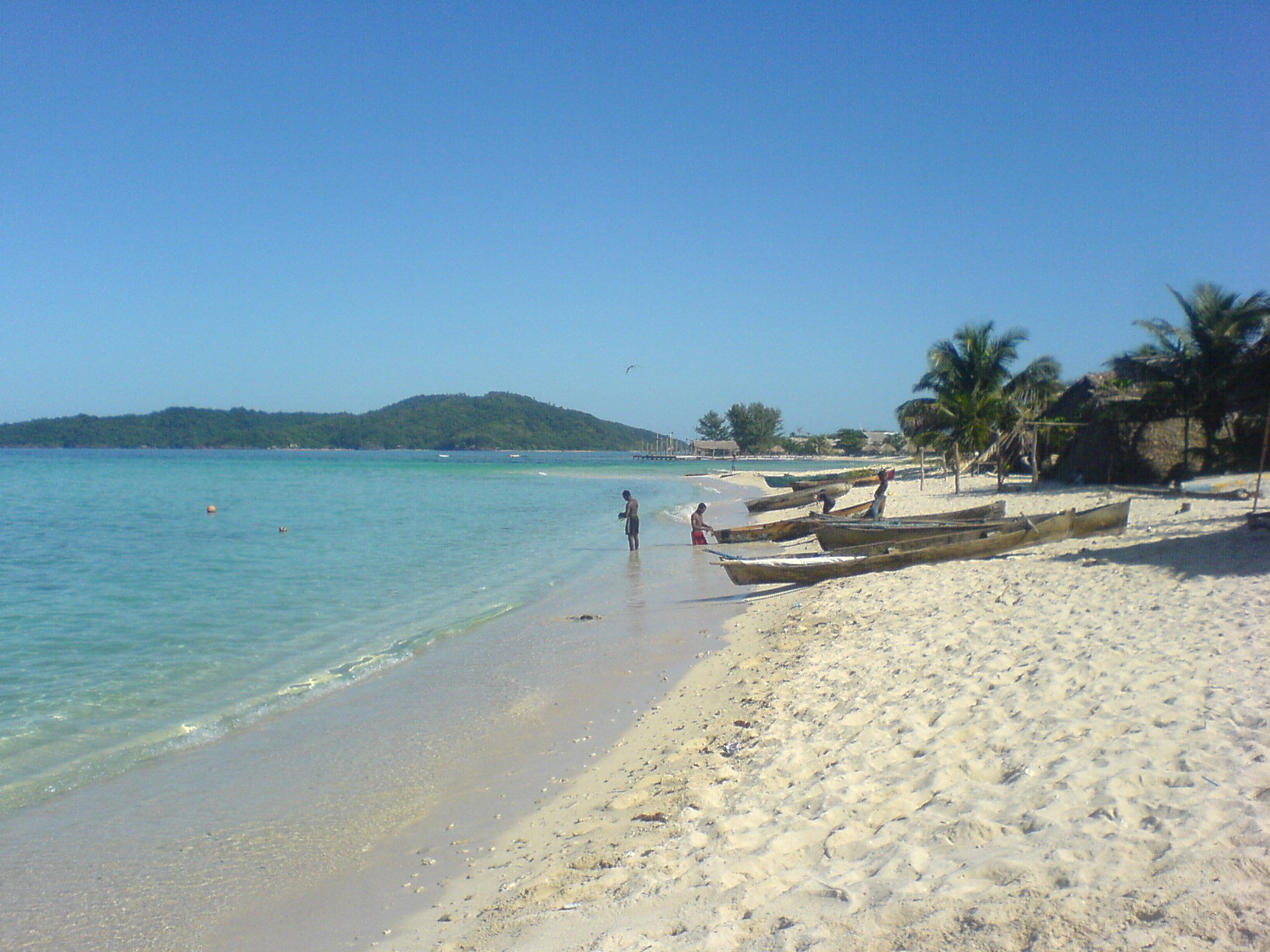
Beach in the Cochinos Cays

Honduras is a touristic destination that attracts visitors due to its natural environment, white and dark sand beaches, coral reefs, abundant flora and fauna, colonial era towns, and archaeological sites. Other attractions include the area's customs and traditional foods. In 2019 Honduras received 2.8 million foreigners, half of those tourists are cruise passengers.

== History ==
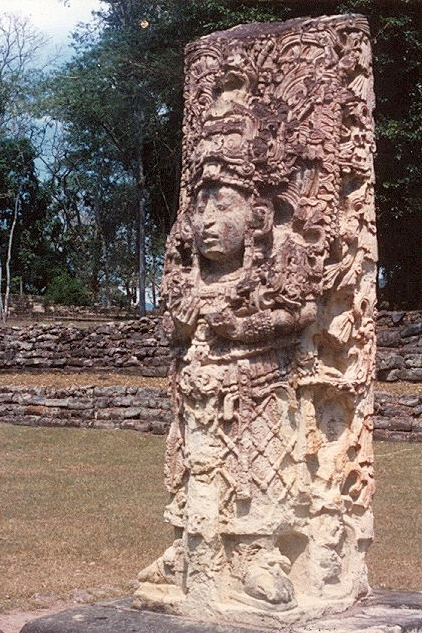
Stela H in Copán. Shows King Uaxaclajuun Ub'aah K'awiil represented as the god of corn

The territory of modern Honduras was discovered in the fourth trip of Christopher Columbus between 1502 and 1503, at that time it was called Guaymuras or Hibueras by local Indians, was followed by the conquest of the inhabitants and later the exploration of land, which involves the making both geographic maps, as coastal charts and of navigation.

In 1526 the conquistador Don Hernán Cortés learned through díceres that in the jungle of the Honduran Mosquito Coast was a city of such splendor as Tenochtitlán, called here the Ciudad Blanca in which its buildings were completely white; Cortés undertook the trip to Honduras to find this great city, then in 1544 the Bishop of Comayagua, Fray Cristóbal de Pedraza assured having crossed the jungle of the Mosquitia and come to a white city. One of the explorers of Cortés was Captain Don Pedro de Alvarado the advanced was carrying many cartographers and clerks who recounted the exploits and discoveries on their trips, another character was Don Diego García de Palacios while He is exploring the landscapes and mountainous areas between Guatemala and Honduras, across the Motagua River he found the Maya city of Copán, he made many notes of the vestiges saw, the wonderful stone buildings and bewilderment that produced those remnants of a civilization that was evident in his report written in 1576.

Later John Lloyd Stephen also he narrates his discoveries and adventures in the work that later published "Incidents of Travel in Mexico, Yucatan and Central America." Other characters who collected and recounted his travels by the Honduran territory: Friar Esteban Verdalet, who is considered a martyr because he was killed at the hands of the Indians Tawahkas and Lencas.

Jesuit priest José Lino Fábregas he born in San Miguel de Tegucigalpa and who would conduct its studies at the University of Mexico and conducted extensive research on the Aztec civilization in that country, Fábregas was withdrawn of the brotherhood due to his works published for teaching in Italian “EZPLICAZIONES DELLE FIGURE HIEROFICHE DEL CODICE BORGIANO MESSICANO, DEDICATA AL ECCELESTISSIMO E REVERENDISSIMO PRINCIPEIL SIGNORE CARIDINALES BORGIA”.

The dedication of the Bishop of Honduras at that time Friar Jerónimo de Corella who with his conservative vision take the bishopric of Trujillo (Honduras) to Comayagua, followed by Bishop Fray Fernando Cardiñanos adventurer who traveled the territory and drafted several reports of censuses for the Spanish crown, so it was possible to give out a how places and parishes existed in Honduras, other of the informants exponents was Don Alejo Conde García who in 1790 he was the first to report the arrival of Galician settlers to Gracias a Dios, while he was Governor of Honduras.

In 1805 Colonel Ramón de Anguiano also reported on population census, the problems of the province and the attack at Trujillo by the British this came the idea of putting more defense in the Fort of Santa Barbara and send to build the Fortress of San Fernando the largest Spanish fortification in Central America; with the arrival of the Abbe Brasseur de Bourboug to the site of Copán in 1864, was impressed by the Mayan remains, also in a note of that year it appears as are and his companions the Mrs. Rob Owen and Osbert Salm taken pictures of the place. 1855 George Eprahim Squier published his notes on Honduras, in the work The States of Honduras and San Salvador. Squir, came to Honduras through the construction of Honduras National Railway. For 1857 the Spanish Antonio Calvache publishes a brochure about his explorations in Honduras.

=== Early tourism ===
in 1881 reached Copán the English archaeologist Alfred Percival Maudslay who makes the deepest studied of this Mayan site, then come other scientists, professionals and scholars who have participated in giving to the world, how is Honduras and many others in the US, Europe and Asia, were perplexed by the stories and details embodied in them, so they started the tourist "boom" to these lands. Another important factor was the arrival in the final decade of the 19th century and beginning of 20th century of the US transnational banana companies like Vaccaro Bros., the Standard Fruit Company, etc. who besides source work, several were the Americans who did so to speak tourism from that country to the Honduran north coast, thus forging a shipping tourist route.

=== First Honduran tourist route ===
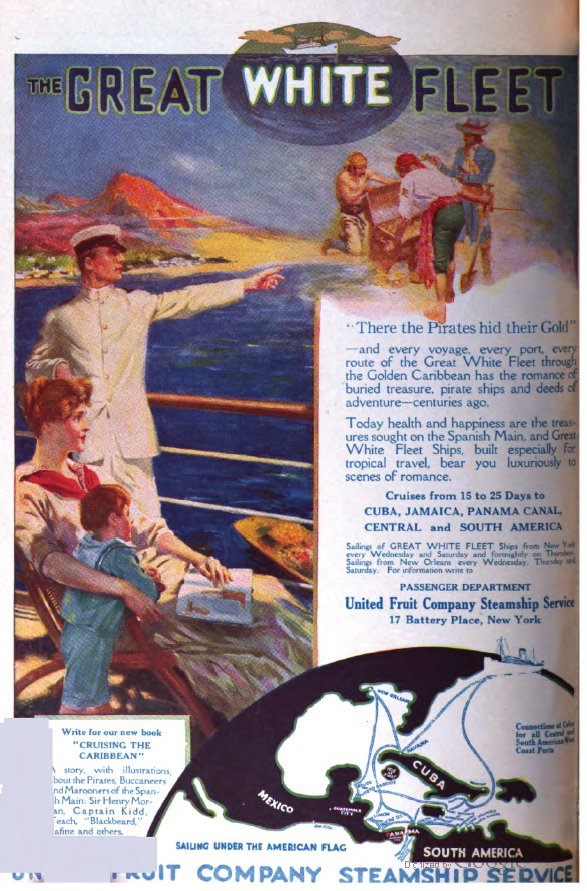
Great white fleet 1916 add.

Since the first decade of 20th century American tourist boats made the following route of the points considered most tourist highlight. With the increase in the presence of North American companies in Honduras, exoticism and beaches began to be attractive to Americans, with several moving to the Honduran coast for vacations.

Vapors ships departed from New Orleans, roamed the Gulf of Mexico, Tampico, port of Veracruz, around the Yucatan peninsula, arrived at the Honduras coast where their destinations were Puerto Cortés, Tela, La Ceiba and Trujillo, returning by Bay Islands, Caribbean Sea, go through the Havana in Cuba and return to the United States.

=== 20th century ===
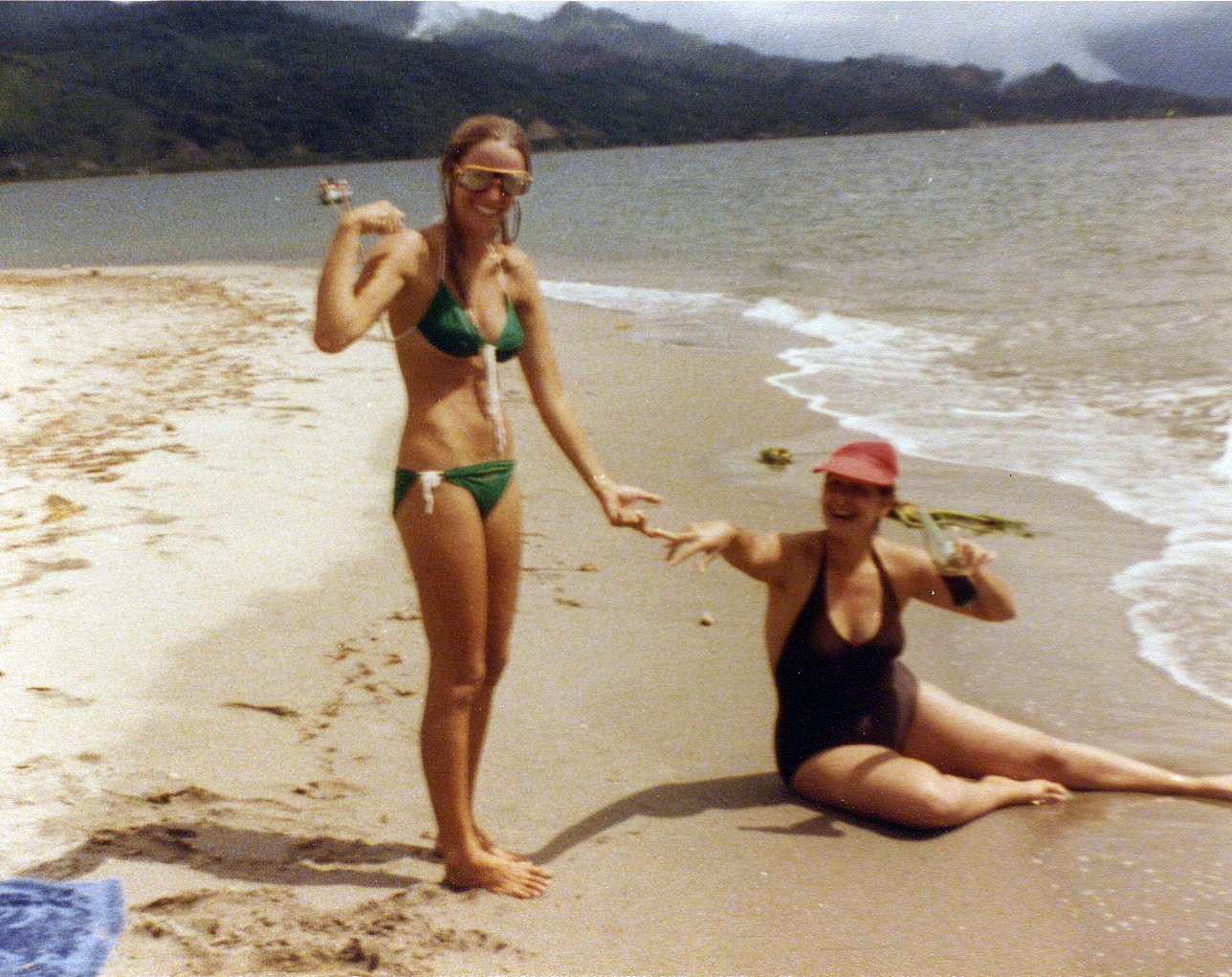
Two American tourists at the beach in Omoa in 1980

The increase in cruise trips made the Honduran coast a common destination for ships. Tourism in Honduras saw a huge increase in the 1970s and 1980s with the increase of American and European tourists. This prompted the creation of hotels in various Honduran cities. Another factor that helped increase tourism in Honduras was that it was quite cheap to stay in the country, given that the products were very cheap, in addition to the fact that Honduras already had a route tour.

=== Modern day ===
With the arrival of the new century, Honduras pointed to be a massive tourist attraction for nationals and foreigners. This was seen in the restoration of colonial historic centers, the increase in street remodeling, also with an increase in advertisements in order to increase the tourist flow in the country. Currently, Honduras is a tourist focus due mainly due to its beaches and mountains, although archaeological tourism has also gained some notoriety. Another attraction are the so-called tourist routes that one can follow.

== Tourist diversity ==
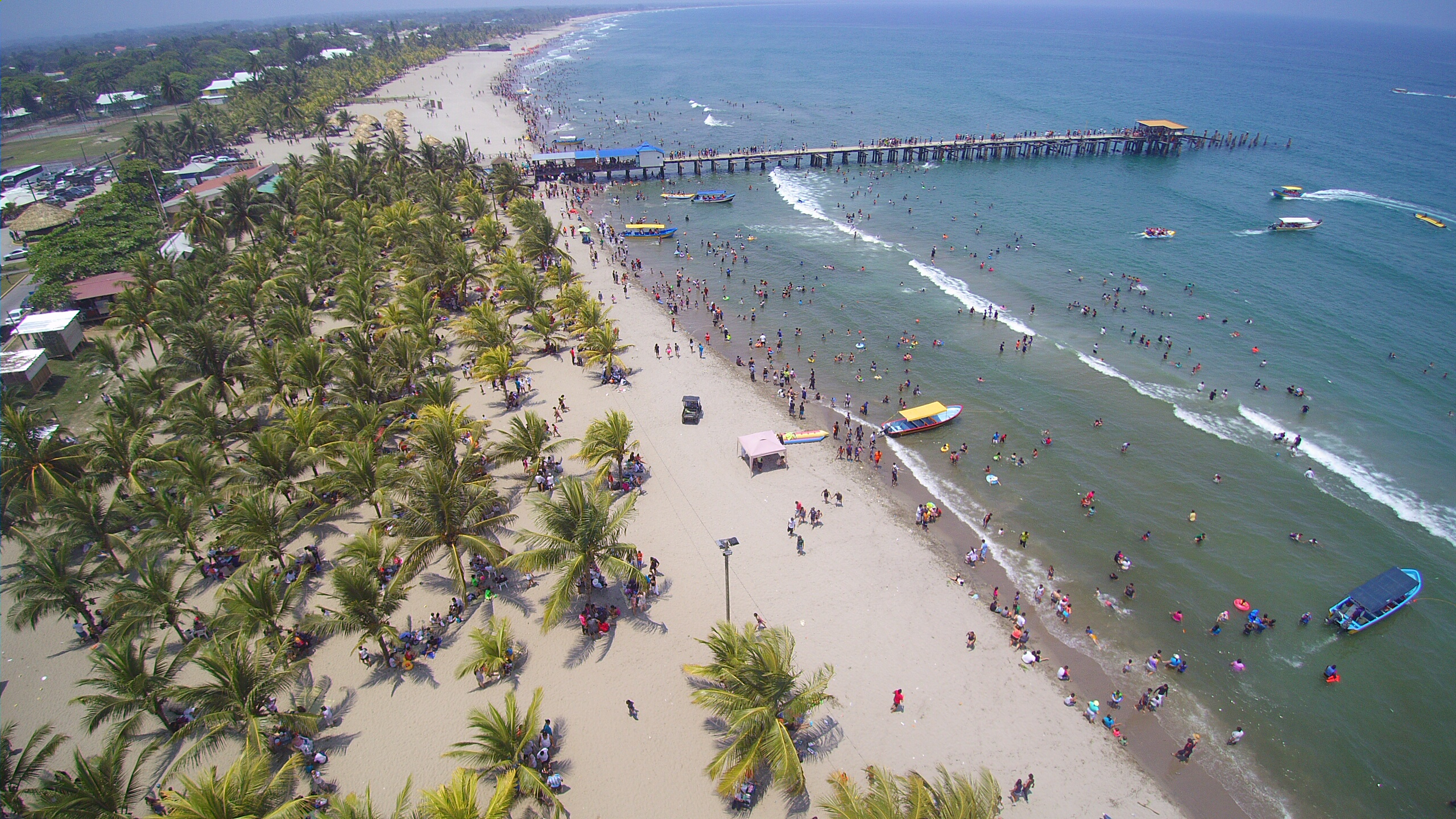
Touristic beach at Tela.

Honduras is visited by visitors from around the world for several reasons, including the visit of its forests, islands and beaches by cruise ships, aircraft or road, being its main engines eco-tourism, cultural tourism and archaeological tourism.

=== Ecotourism ===
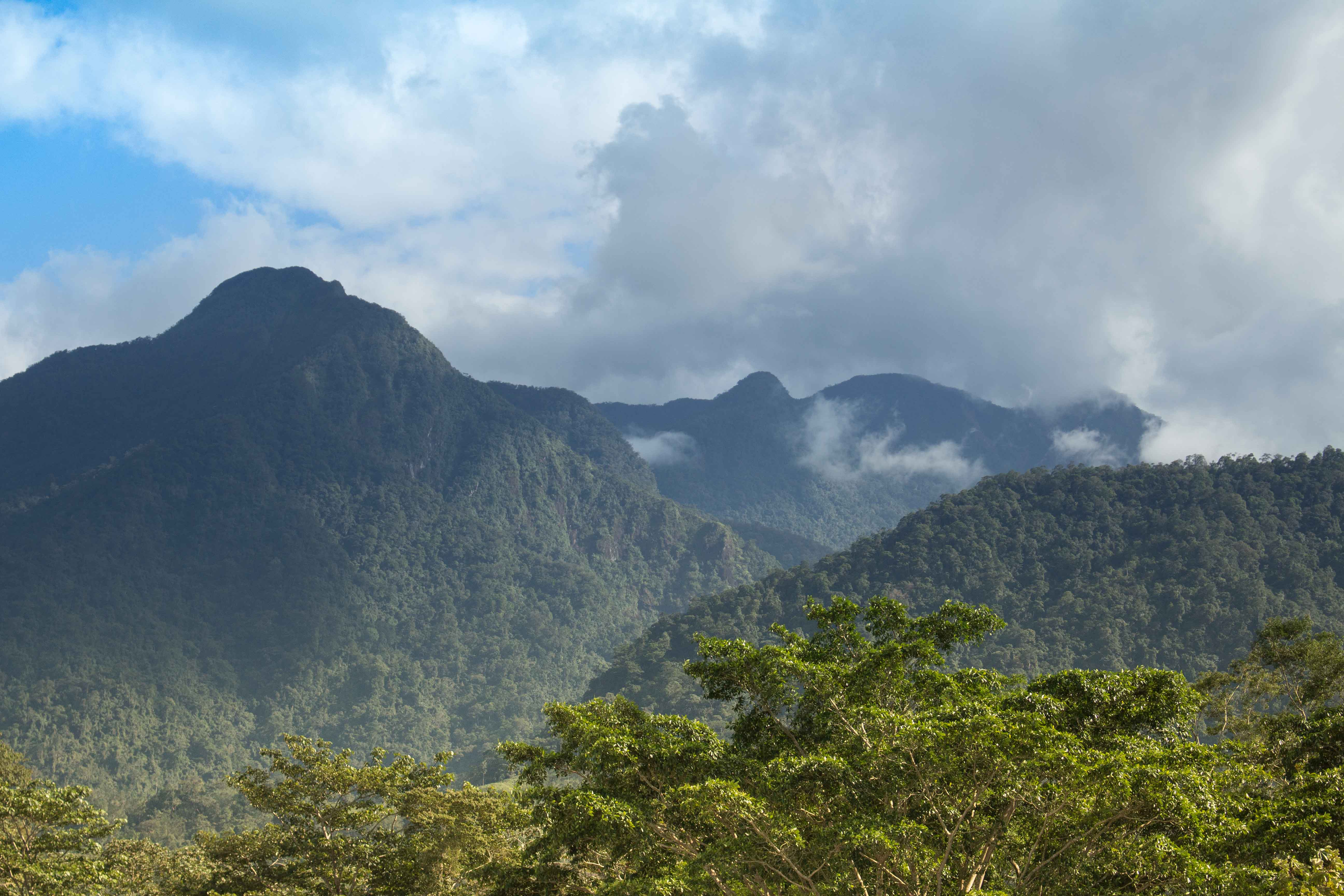
Pico Bonito park.

Honduras is an ideal place for eco tourism, has many forests, beaches, coral reefs and a variety of protected areas ideal for sightseeing. Honduras is home to an estimated 8,000 plant species, about 250 reptiles and amphibians, more than 700 species of birds and 110 species of mammals, distributed in different ecological regions of the country.

Honduras is very popular because of the beauty of the coral reefs in the Bay Islands, the Cochinos Cays and the beautiful beaches in Roatán. Another tourist destination is the Río Platano Biosphere, among other points of special interest

==== Gallery ====
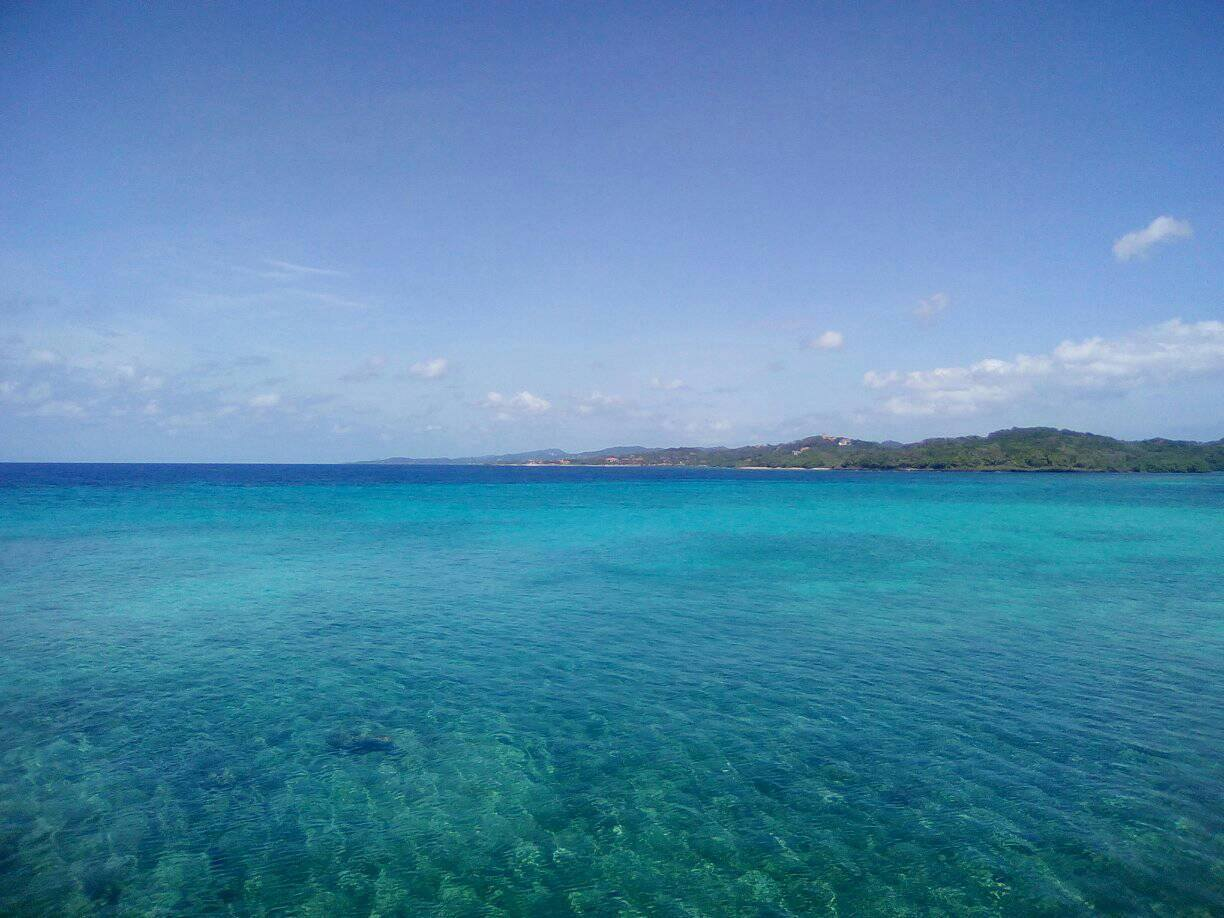
Coral reef at Roatán

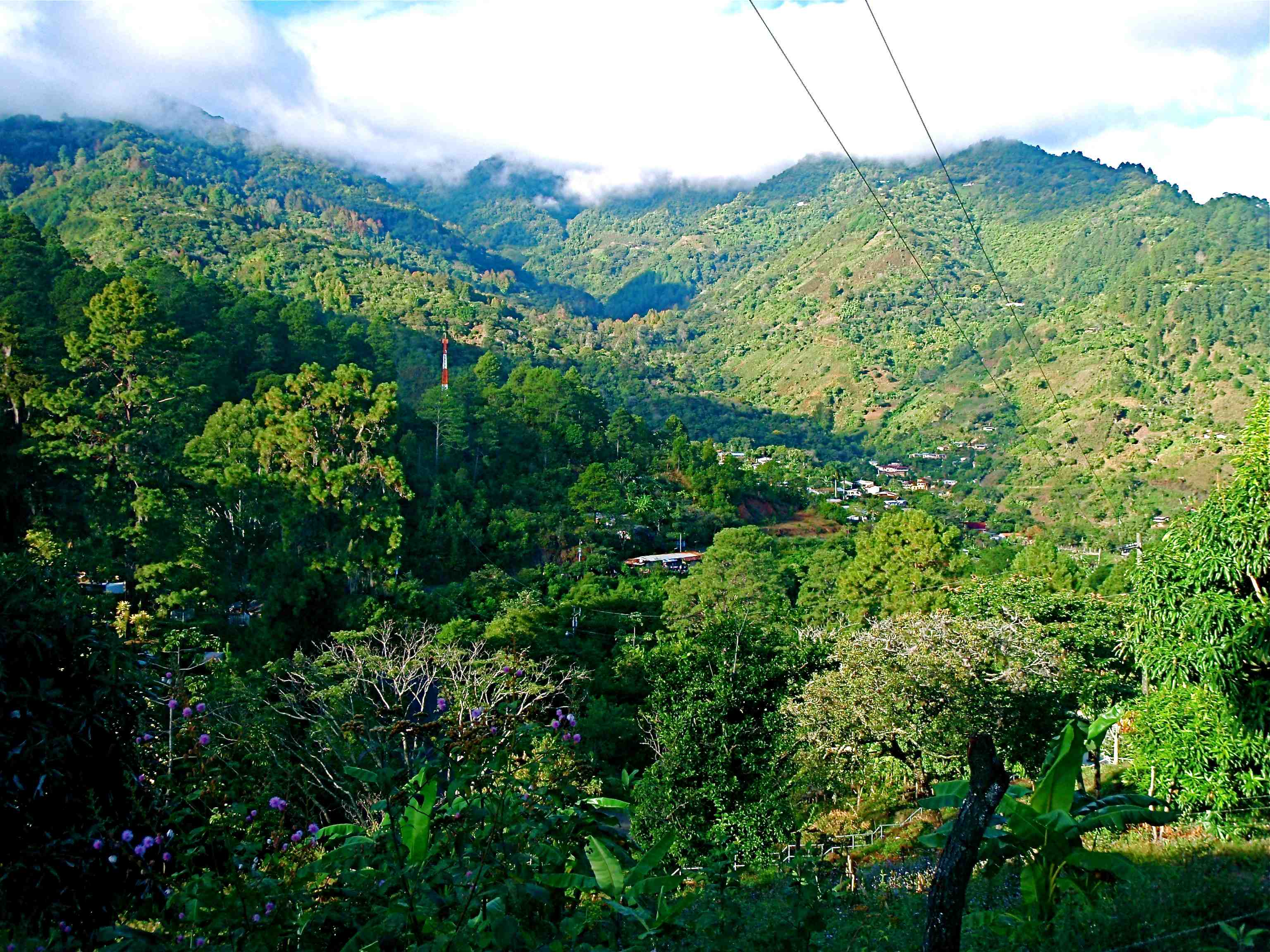
La Tigra national pak

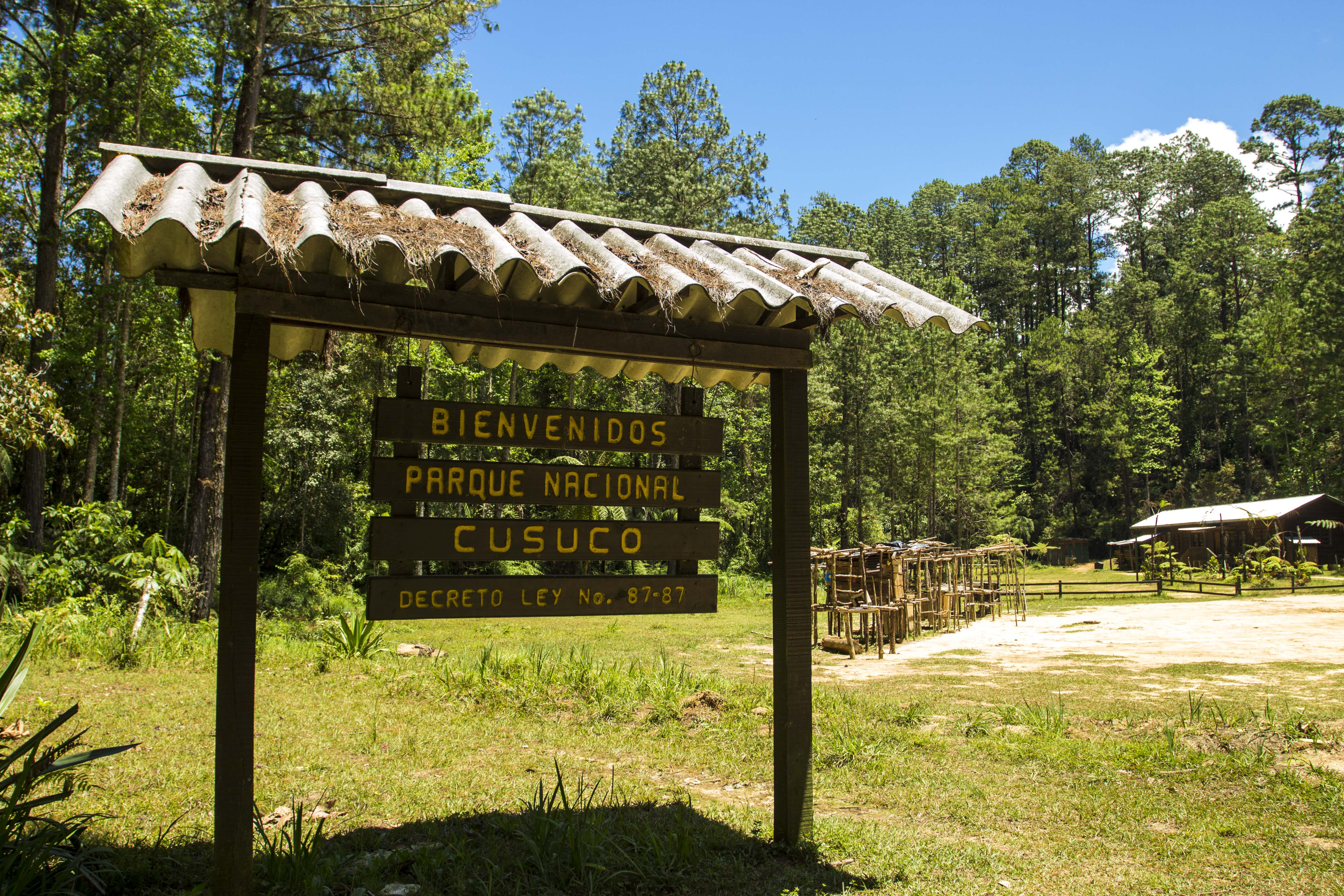
Cusuco national Park

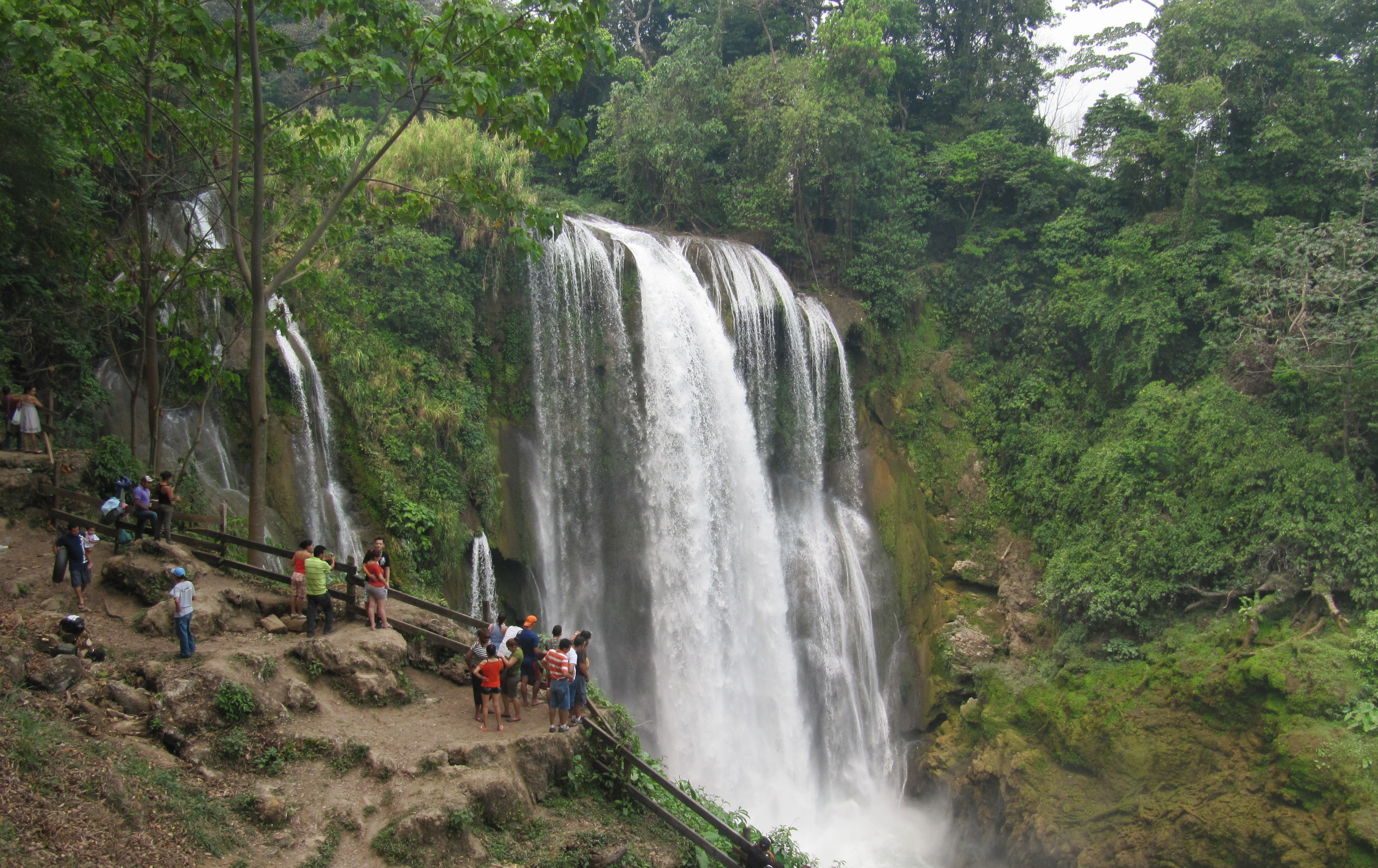
Pulhapanzak waterfall

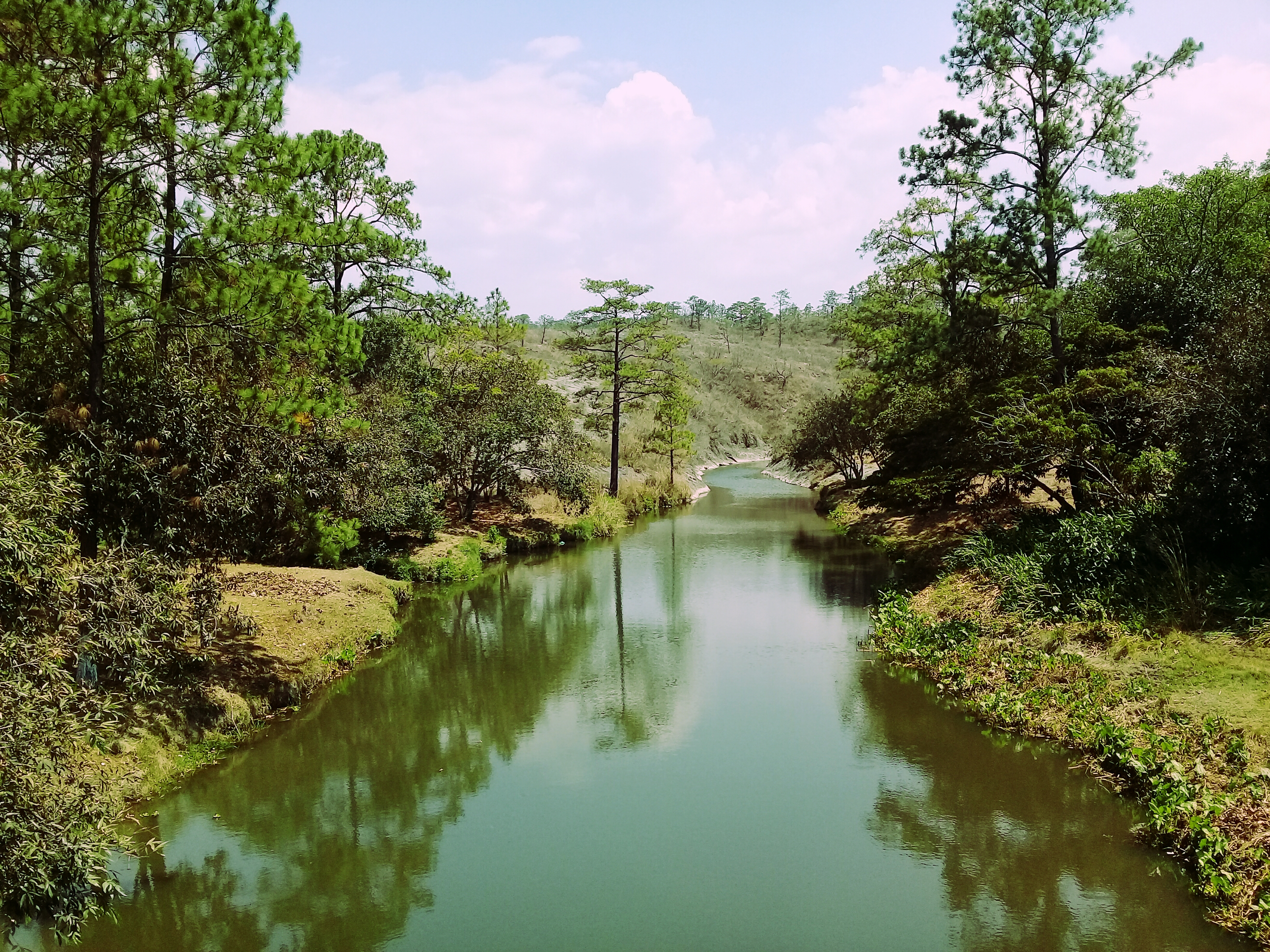
San Antonio River

=== Archaeological tourism ===
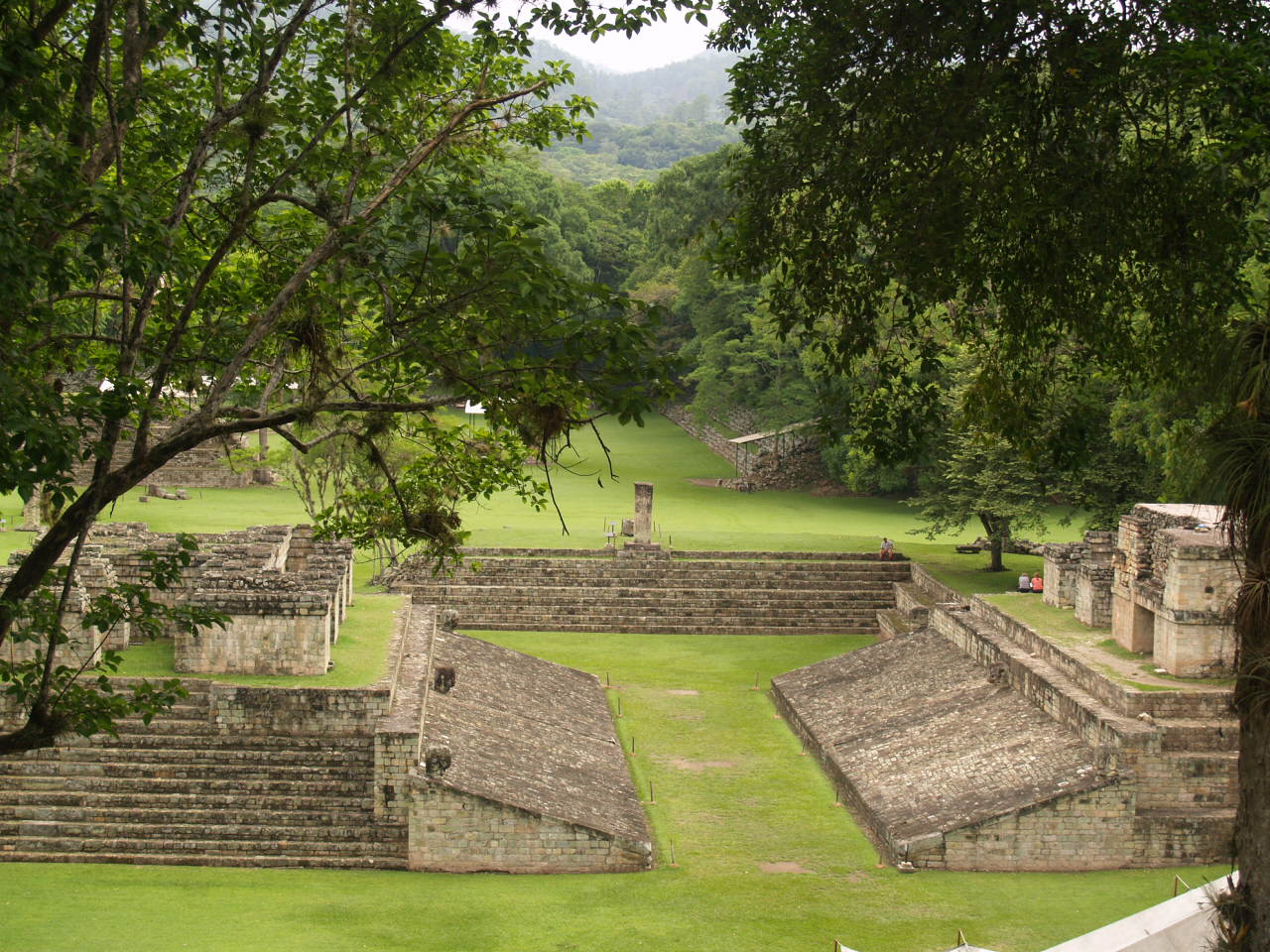
Ballgame field was dedicated by Uaxaclajuun Ub'aah K'awiil

Always in the 19th century was when experts archaeologists, epigraphers and Mayanists they were dumped in to the rescue of the city of Copán is as the government of Honduras implement an economic program and cooperation with international organizations, universities and specialized museums with the sole purpose of preserving the archaeological site. In turn, placing it on the tourist map with other Mexican and Guatemalan Mayan cities, which were the first to be opened to the public. Honduras currently has museums exclusively with remains of the Mayan civilization.

There is a strong interest of the international community for archaeological sites like the city of Copán was built and occupied in a period where the Mayan culture had its most literal expression, ruled by a dynasty of 16 kings The Mayas of Copán built many temples, altars and steles in high and low relief, also has the ball park, is one of the most visited by tourists in Honduras.

Archeological sites:

- Copán
- Cuevas de Talgua
- El puente
- El rastrojón
- El Curruste
- Rio amarillo
- Las sepulturas
- Los Naranjos
- Tenampúa
- Yarumela

==== Gallery ====
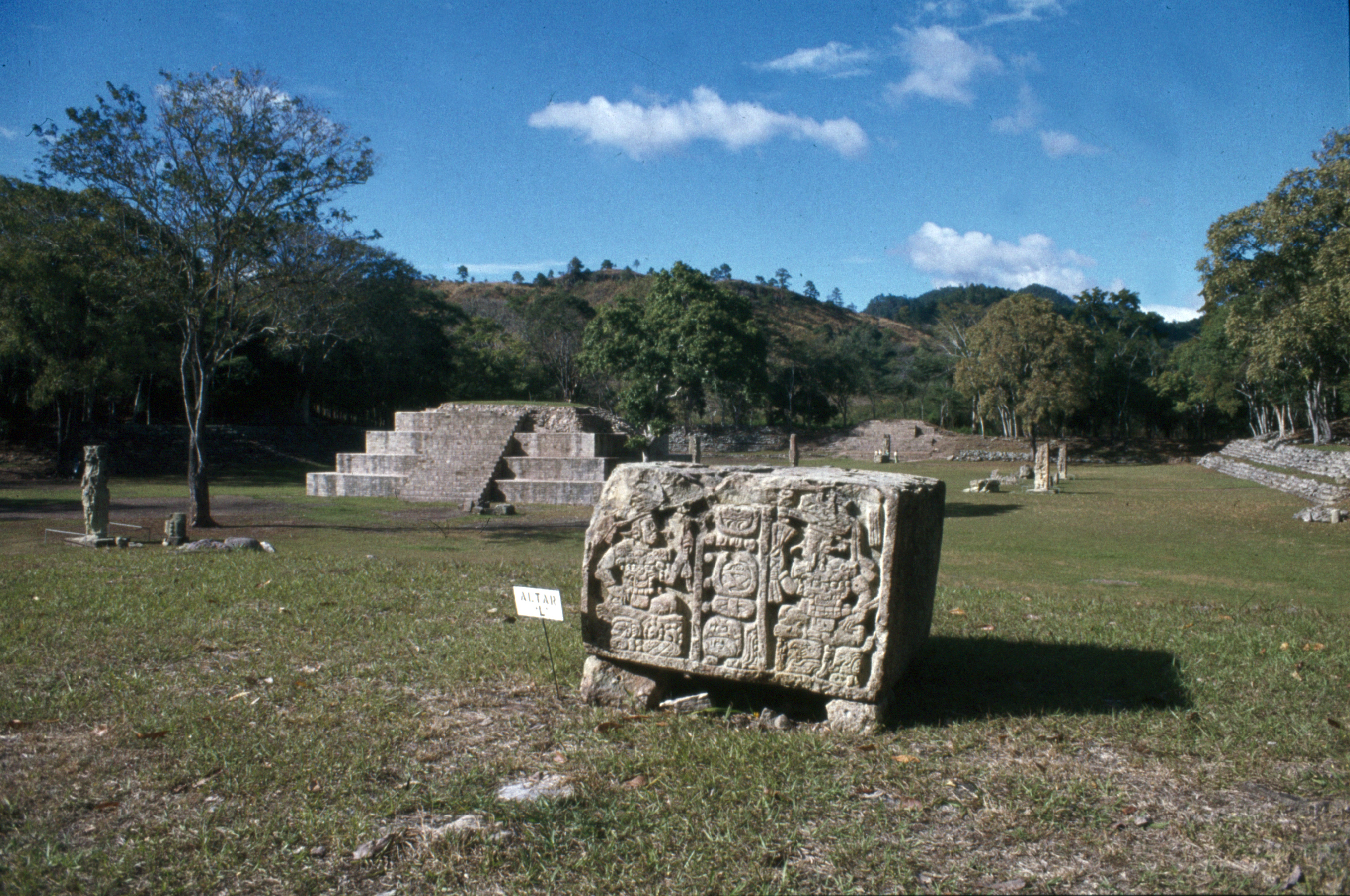
Copan Archeological site.

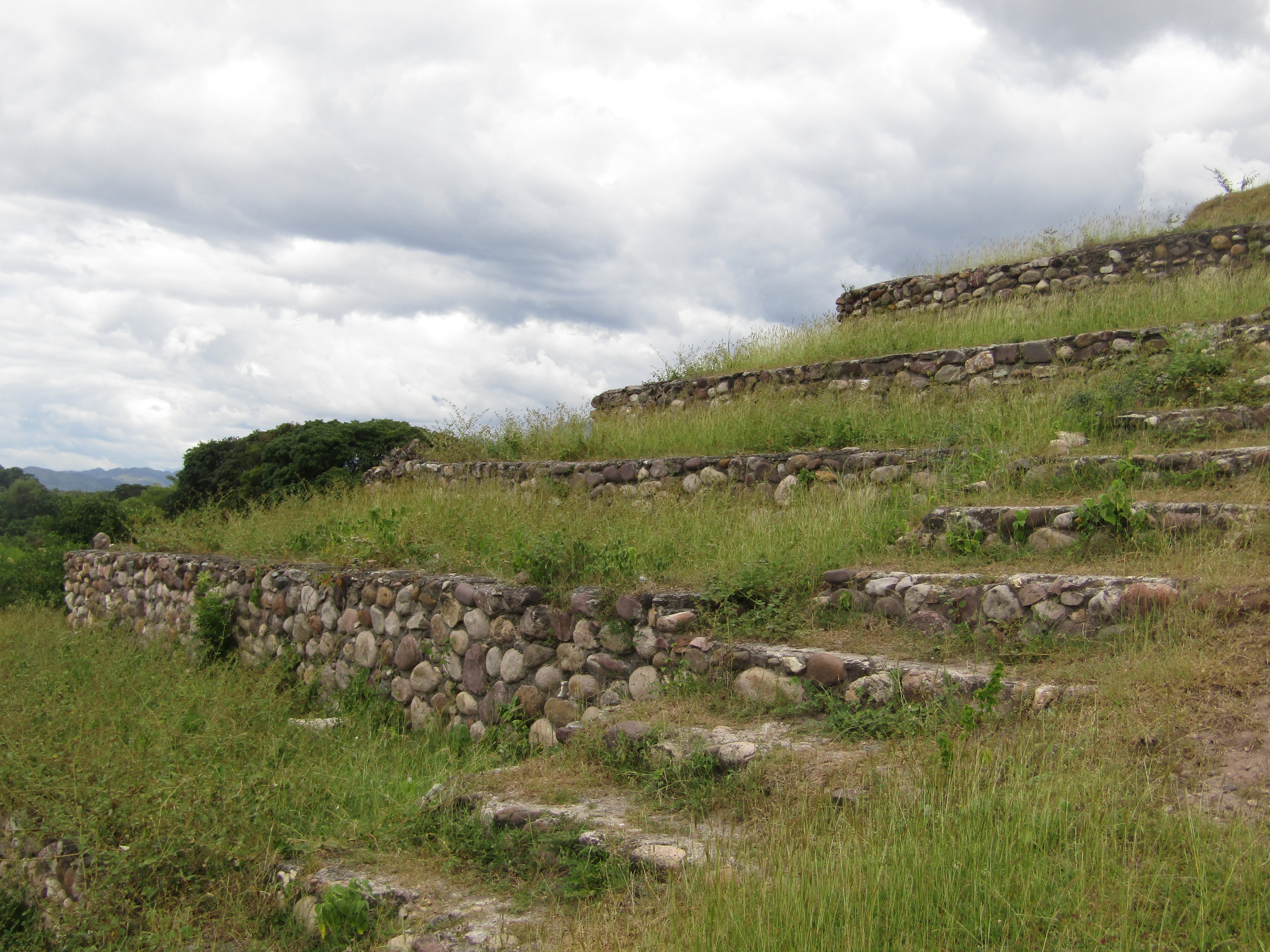
Pyramid at el Chilcal de Yarumela site.

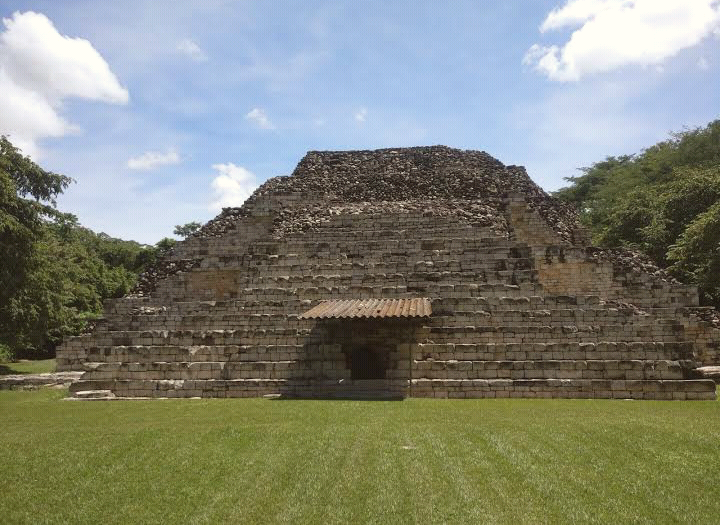
Pyramid at El puente Archeological site.

=== Cultural tourism ===
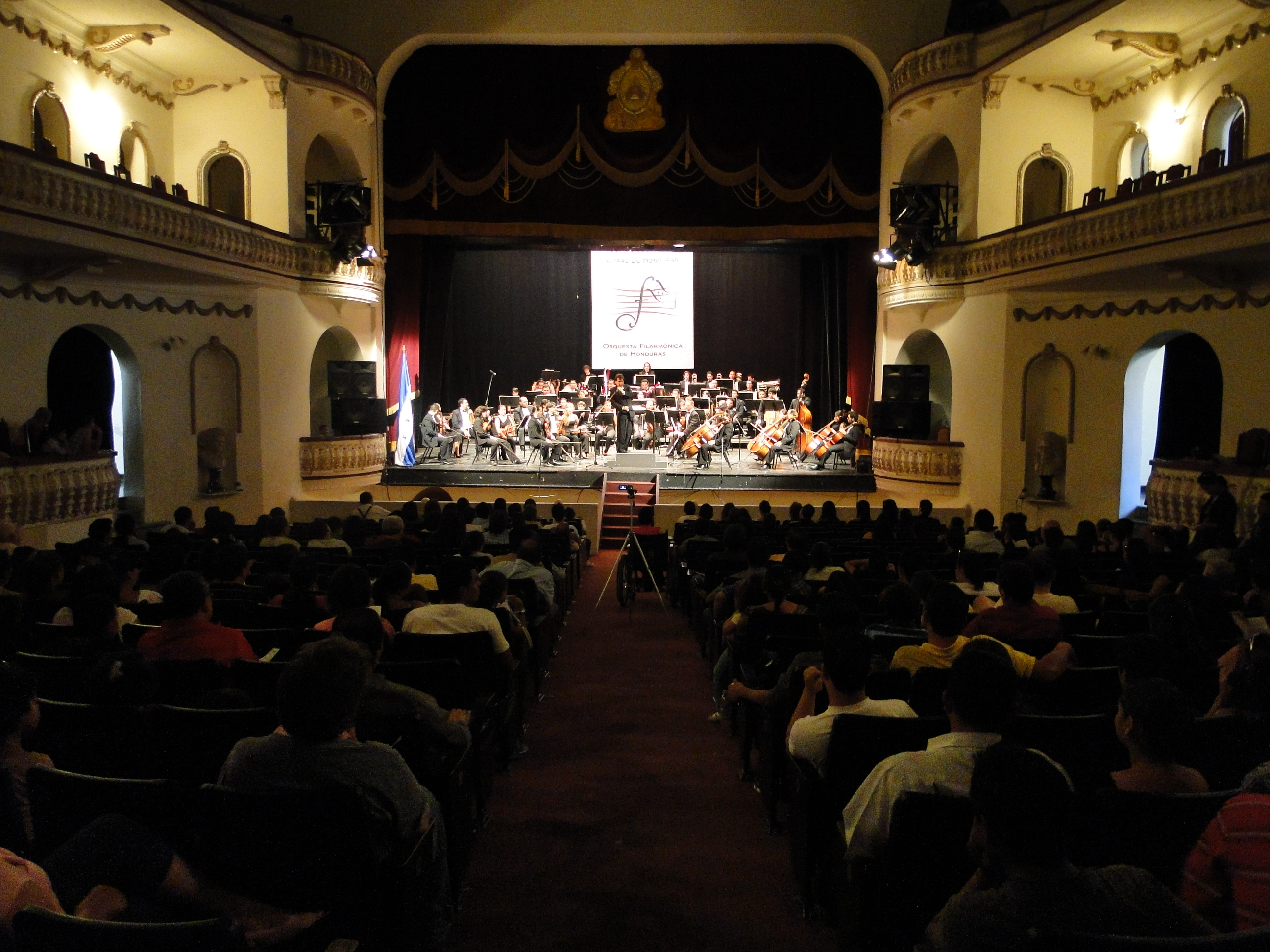
Manuel Bonilla National Theatre

Honduras possesses an invaluable cultural heritage, a mix between Spanish, Indigenous, and African traditions. Both in music, arts, dance, and popular culture. One of the most famous characteristics of Honduras in the music and dance of the Gafrifunas in the Caribbean dance that has become a symbol of Honduran identity. Another cultural characteristic of Honduras are the Holy Week carpets, a tradition of Spanish heritage.

==== Gallery ====
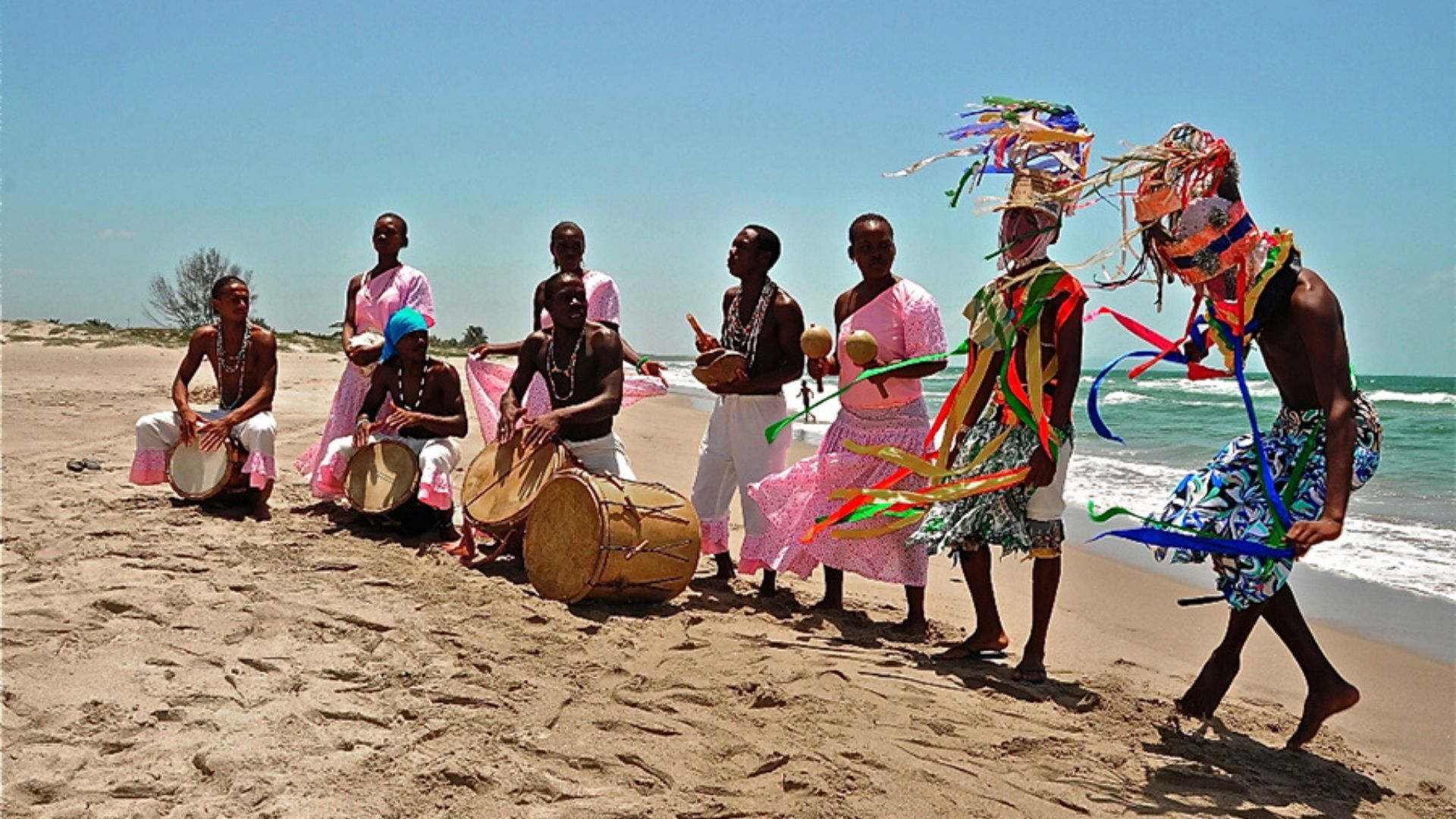
Punta dance

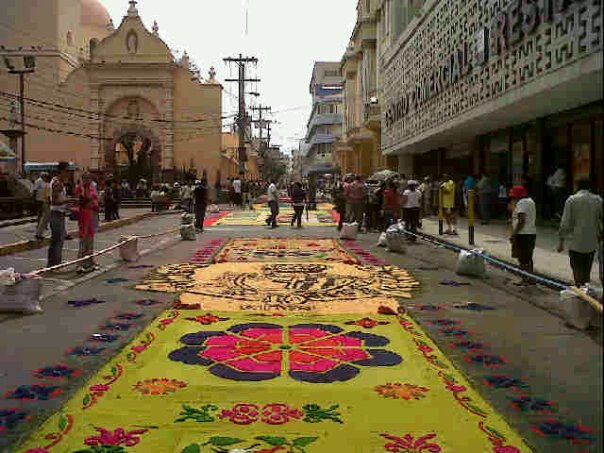
Holy week carpet in Tegucigalpa

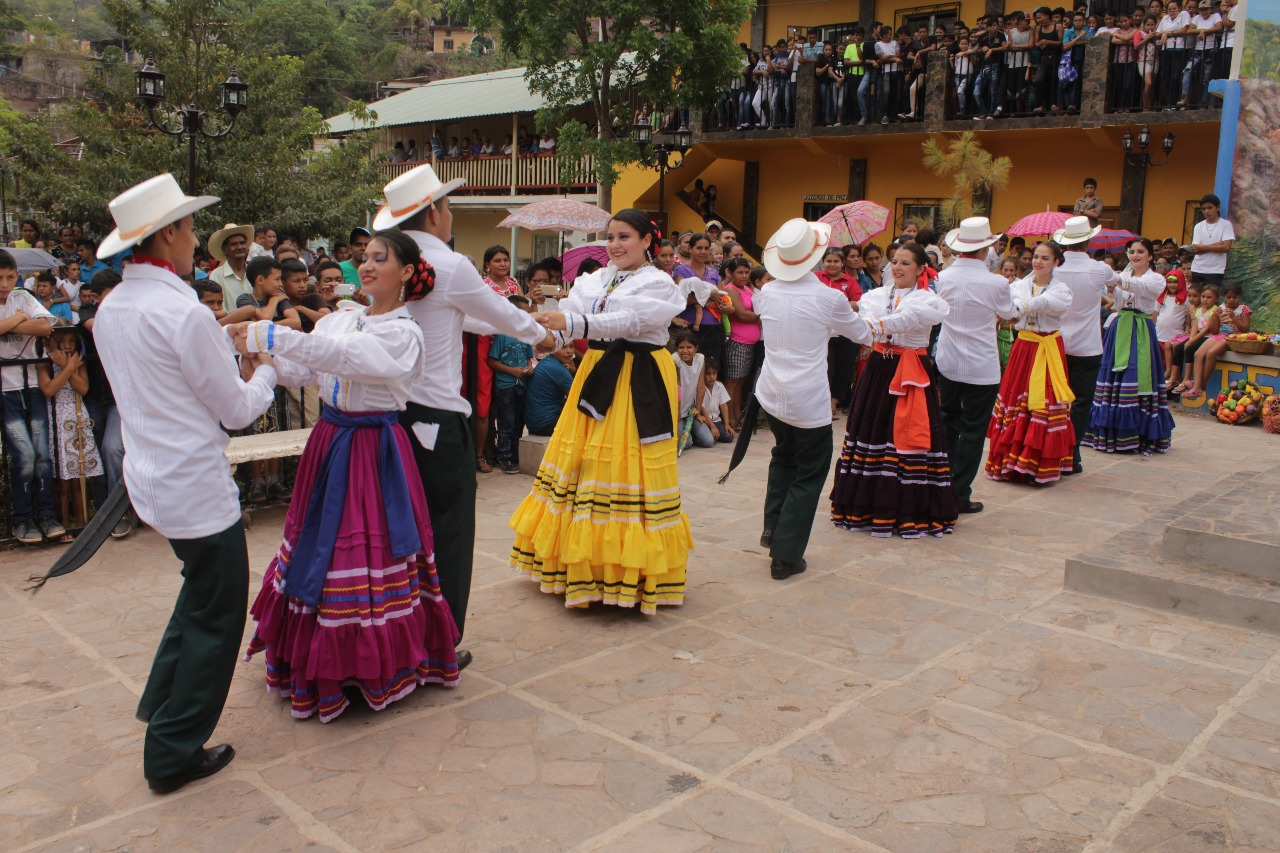
Honduran traditional dance

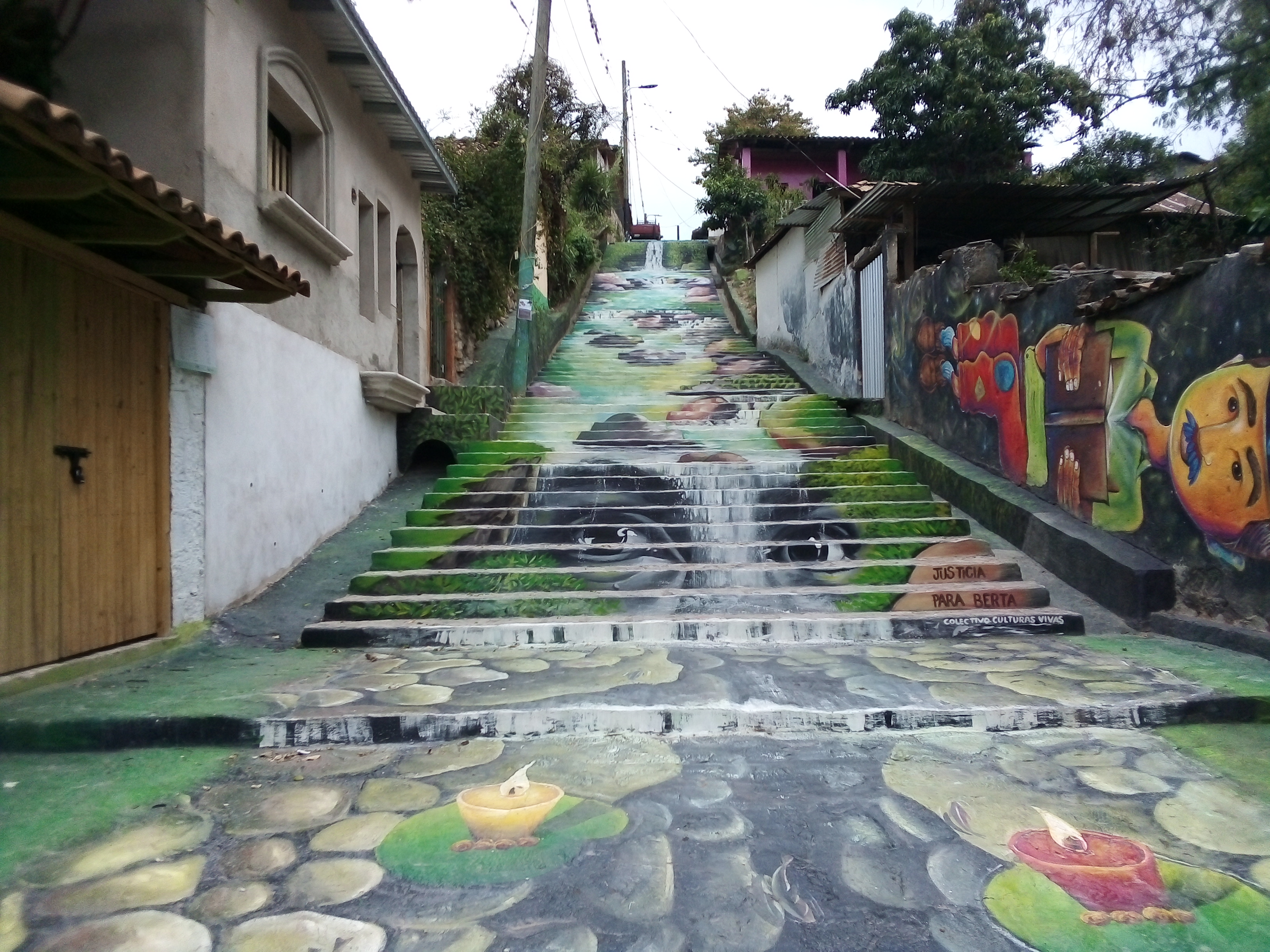
Cantarranas murals

==== Museums ====
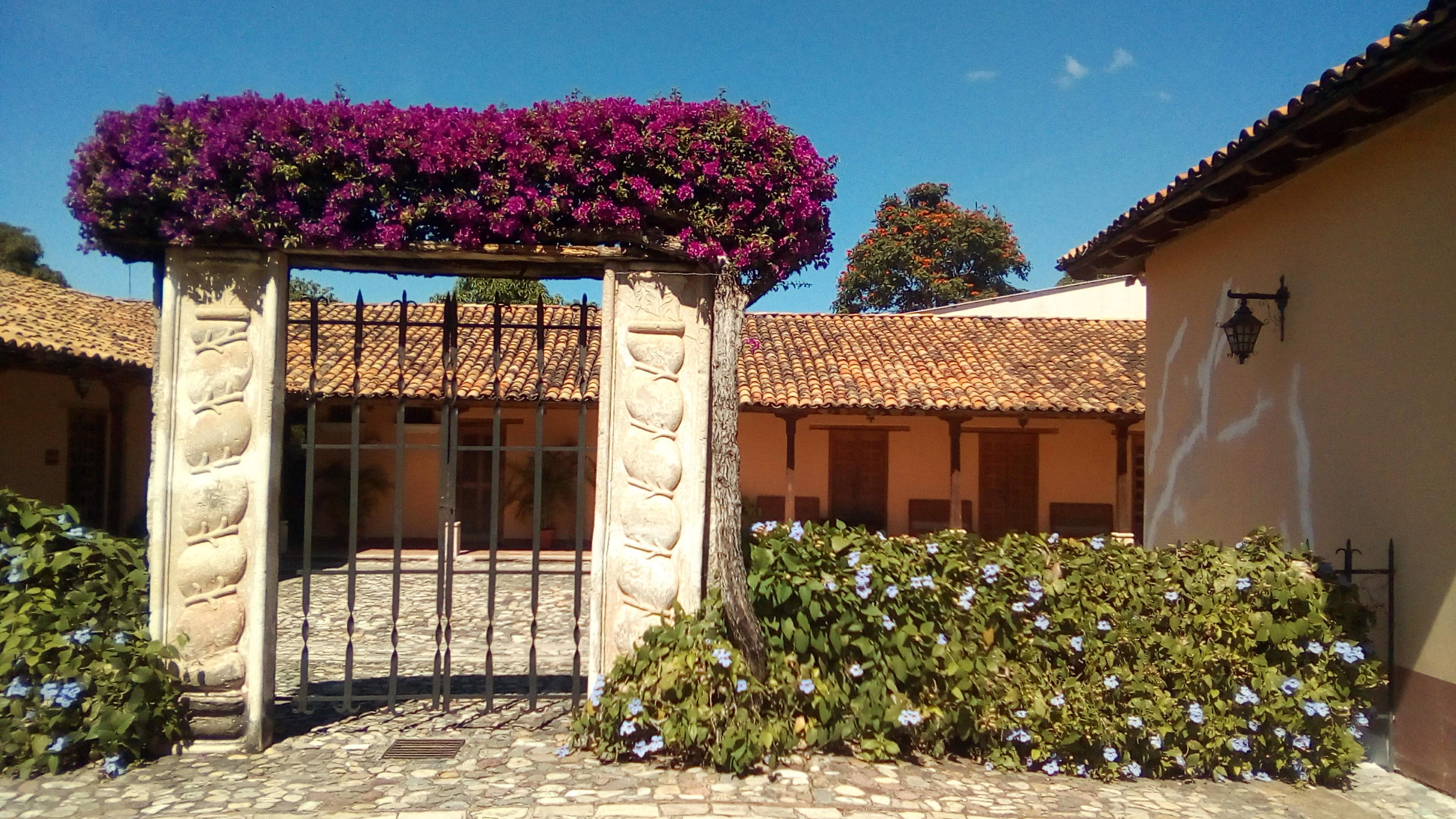
Archeological museum of Comayagua.

Honduras has a variety of museums, among which are the Villa Roy Republican History Museum, the Museum of the Honduran Man, the Museum of Anthropology and History, the Honduran Aviation Museum and Museum of National Identity (Honduras), among others.

- Archeologcial museum of Comayagua
- National Archives of Honduras
- National Library of Honduras
- Museum of the Casa Presidencial of Honduras,
- Barracks San Francisco Military Museum,
- Museum of Tegucigalpa cathedral
- Museum of Banco Atlantida S.A.,
- Museum of religious art
- Mayan Sculpture museum
- Museum of Central Bank of Honduras,
- Pinacoteca of Central Bank of Honduras,
- Tela Railroad Museum
- Manuel Bonilla National Theatre,
- Museum of Anthropology and History (Honduras),
- Museum of National Identity (Honduras),
- Museum of the Honduran Man,
- Honduran Aviation Museum,

==== Gallery ====
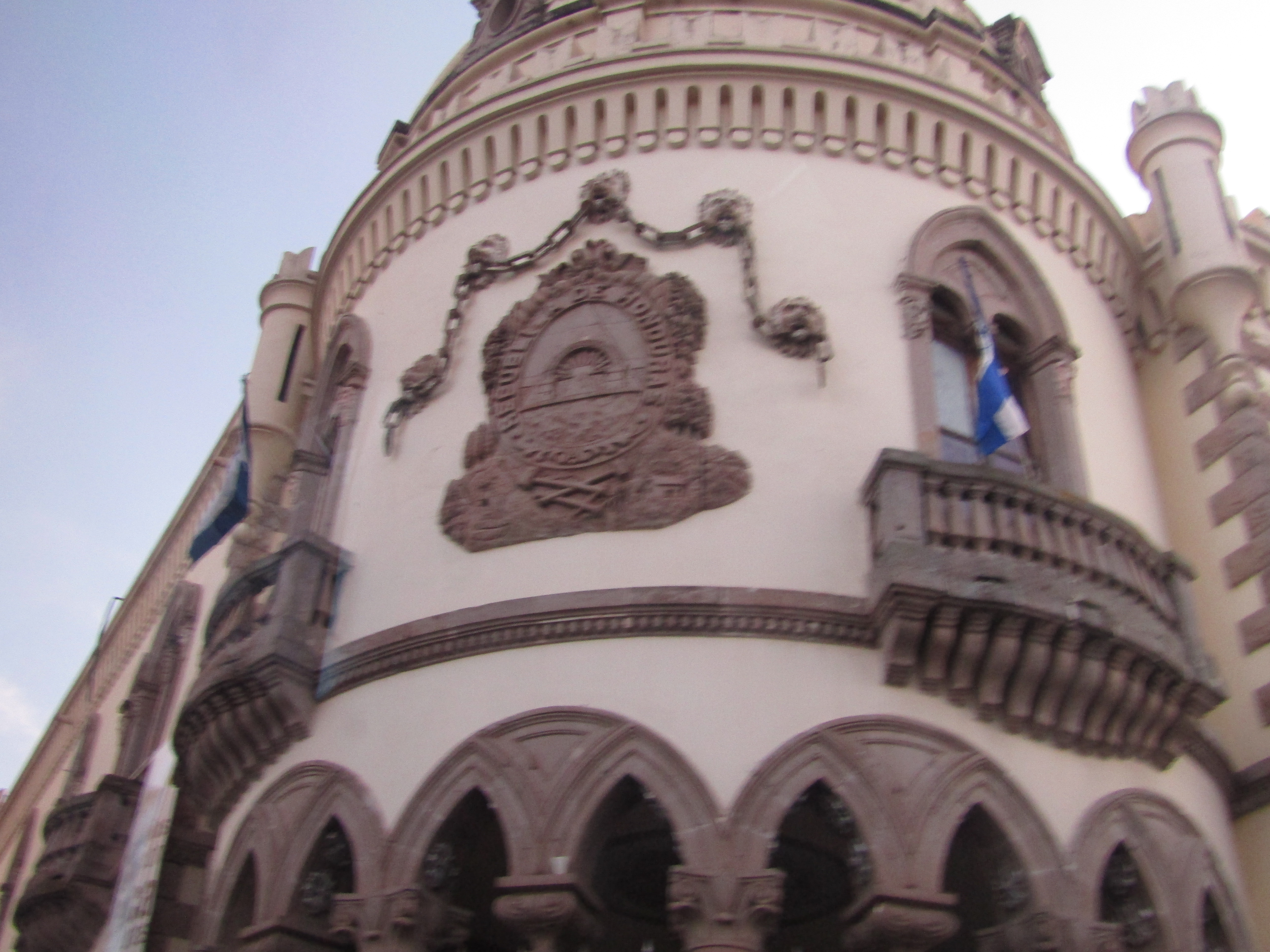
Old presidential palace of Honduras Museum

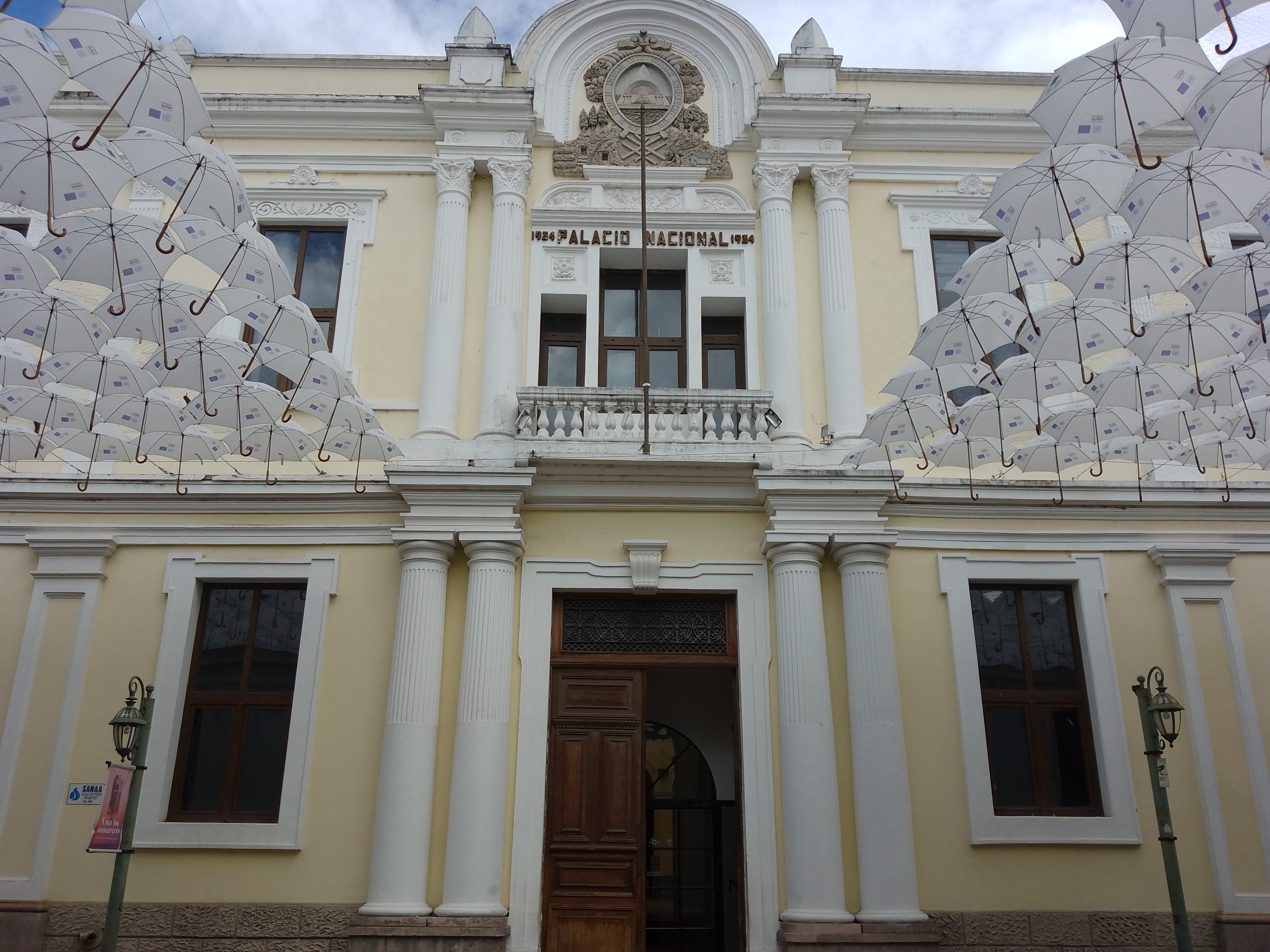
Museum for National Identity

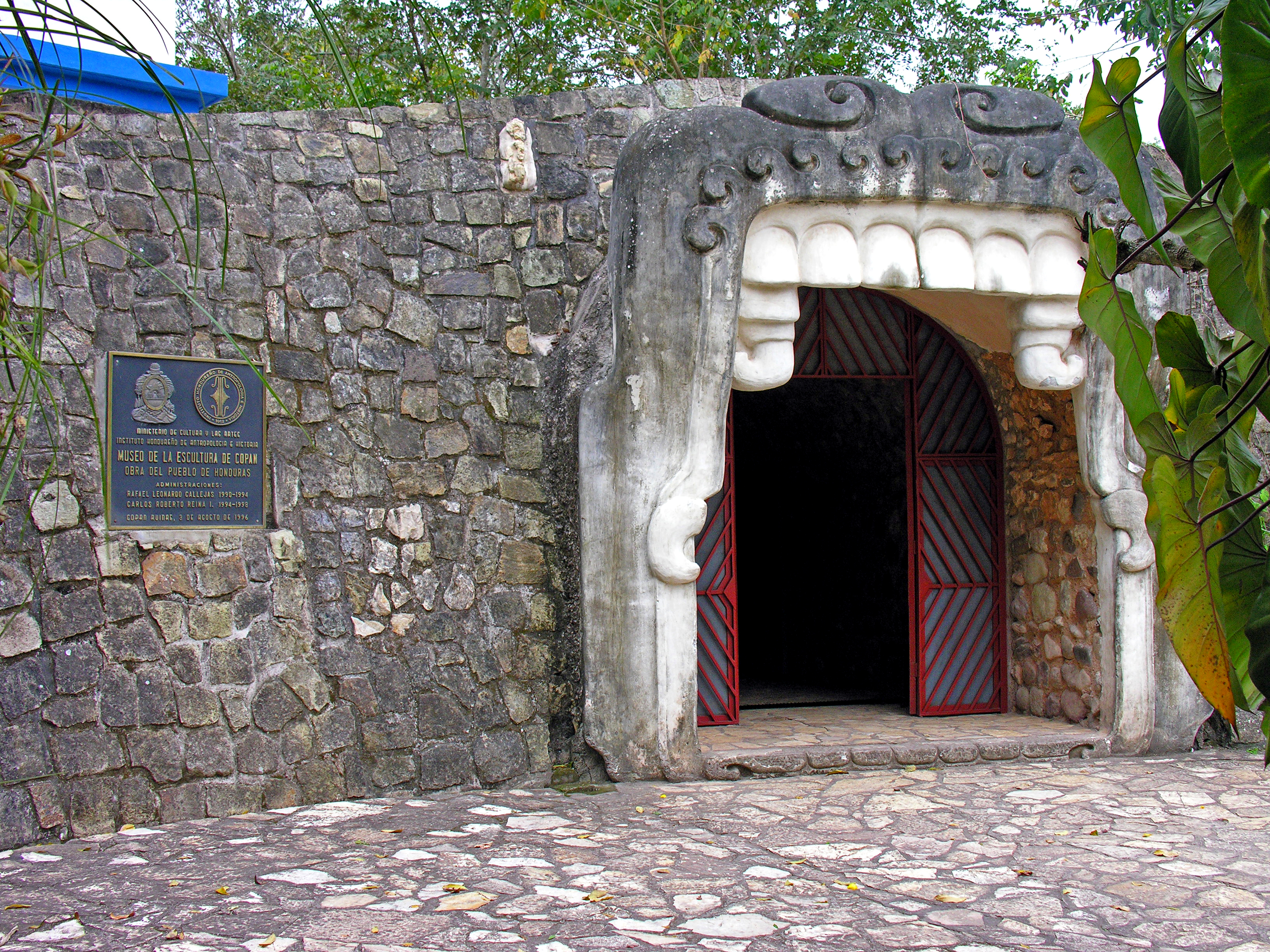
Mayan sculpture museum

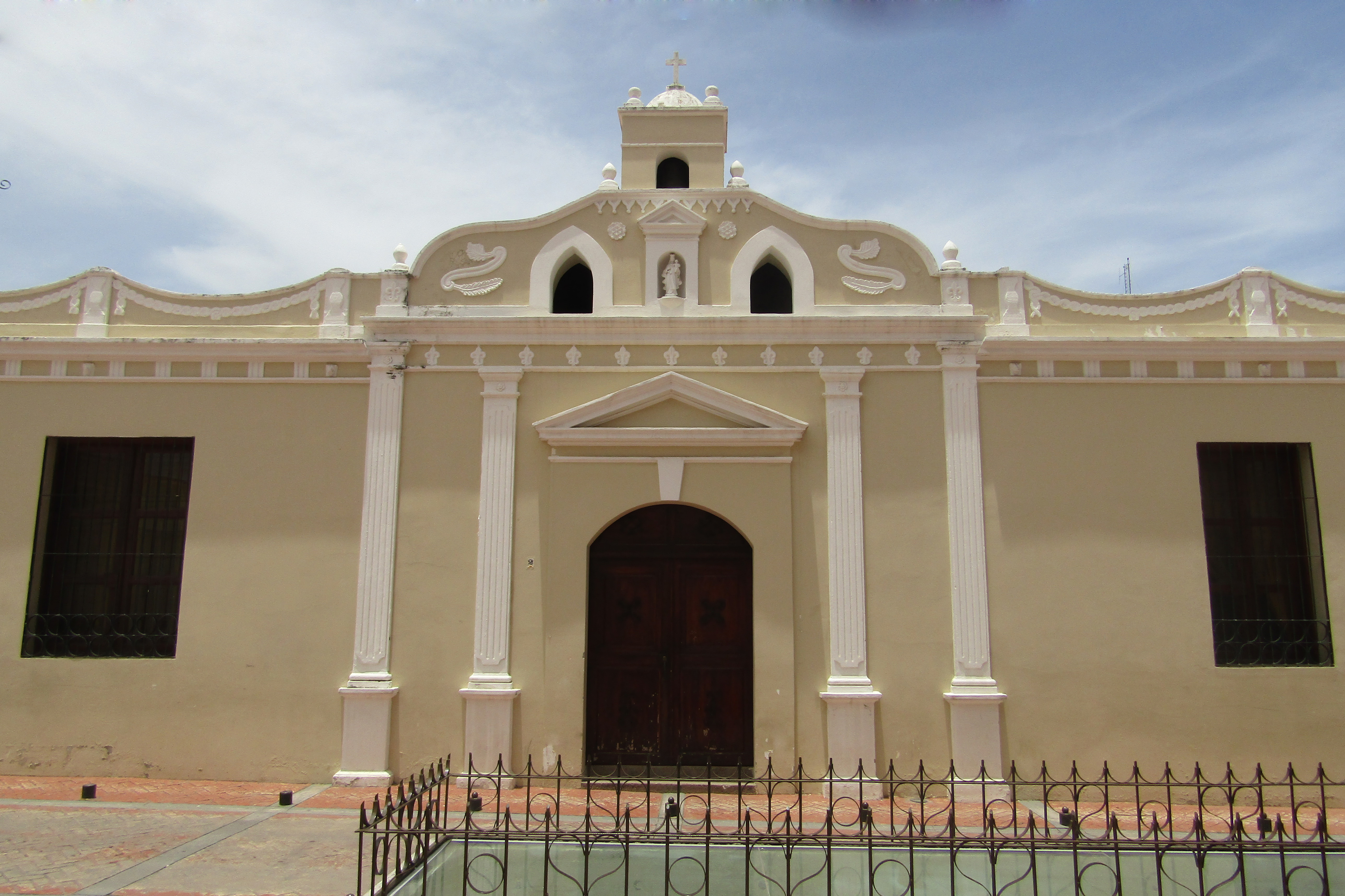
Museum of religious art

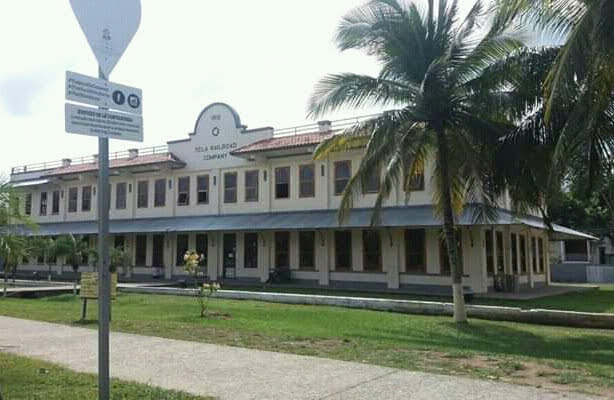
Tela Rail road company Museum

==== Historical tourism ====
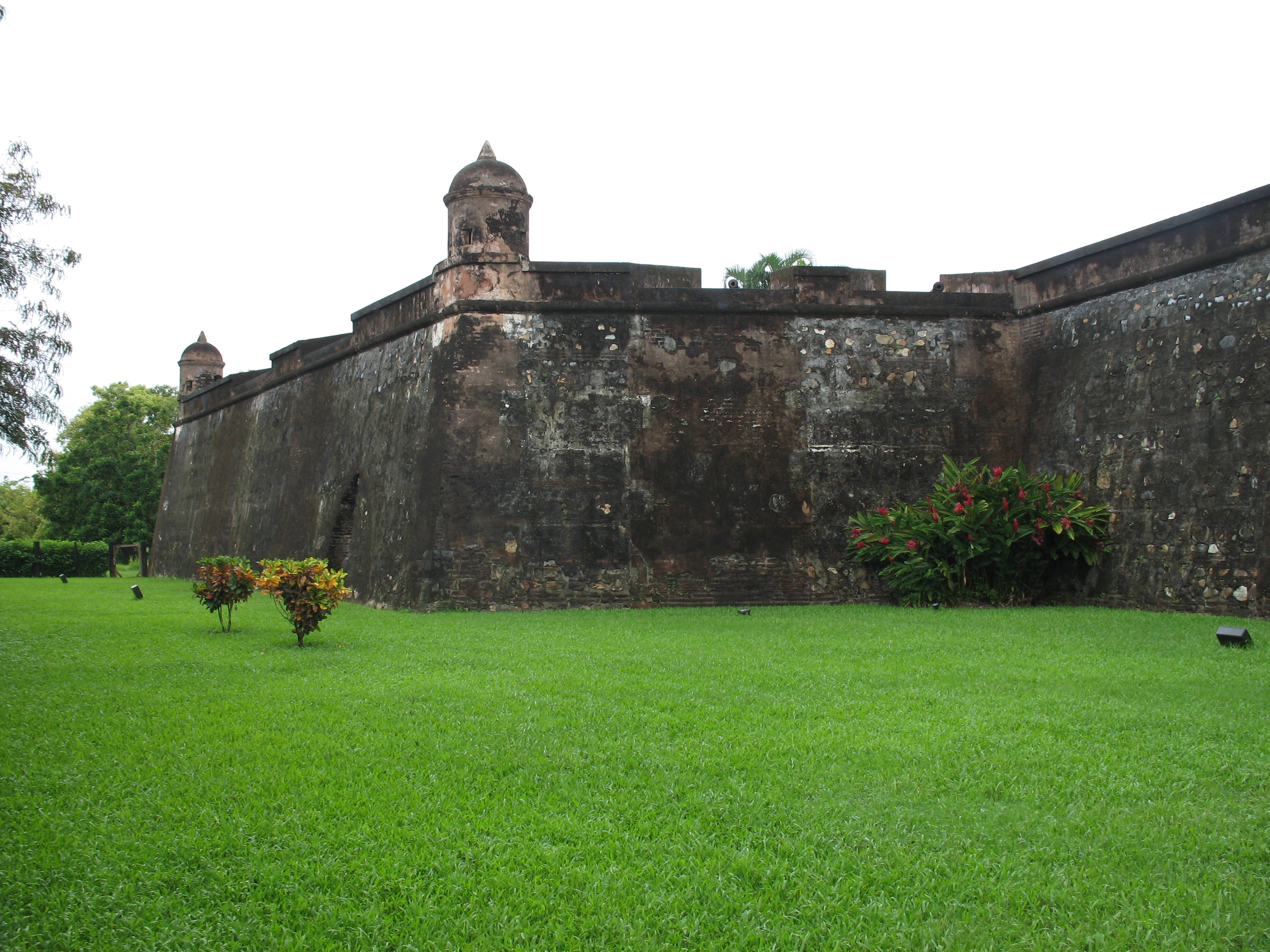
Exterior of the Fortress of San Fernando, the largest Spanish fortification in Central America

Since the 2000s the IHAH (Honduran Institute of Anthropology and History) has begun to improve the historic urban centers and various old buildings. The clearest example is the enormous restoration of historic buildings in colonial cities such as Comayagua.

- Fortress of San Fernando, Omoa
- Old presidential palace of Honduras, Tegucigalpa
- Basilica of Suyapa, Tegucigalpa
- St. Michael Archangel Metropolitan Cathedral, Tegugucigalpa
- Inmaculate conception Cathedral, Comayagua
- Caxa Real, Comayagua
- Metropolitan Cathedral of San Pedro Sula, San pedro Sula
- Fortress of Santa Bárbara, Trujillo
- Fort San Cristóbal, Gracias
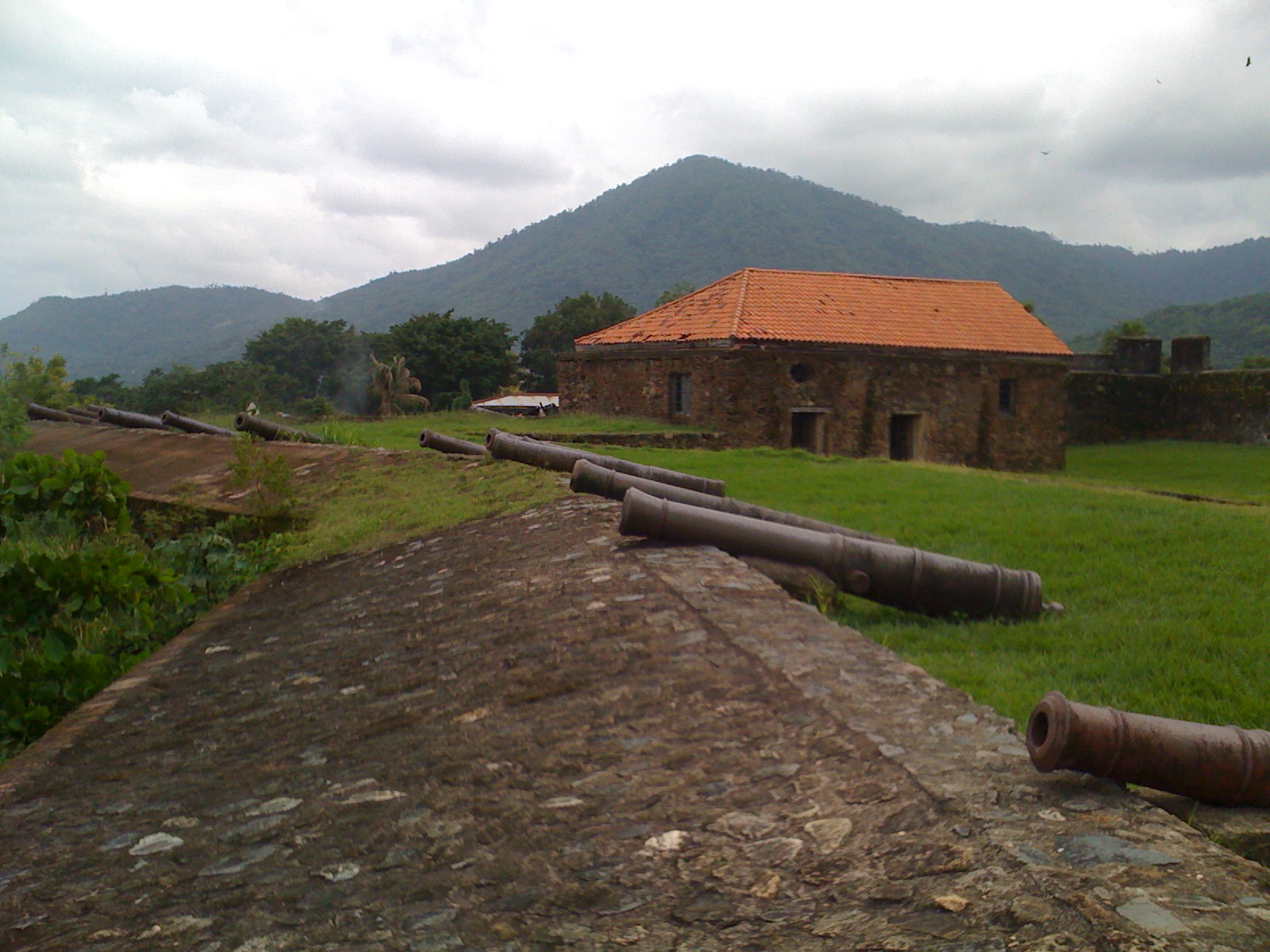
Santa Barbara fortress

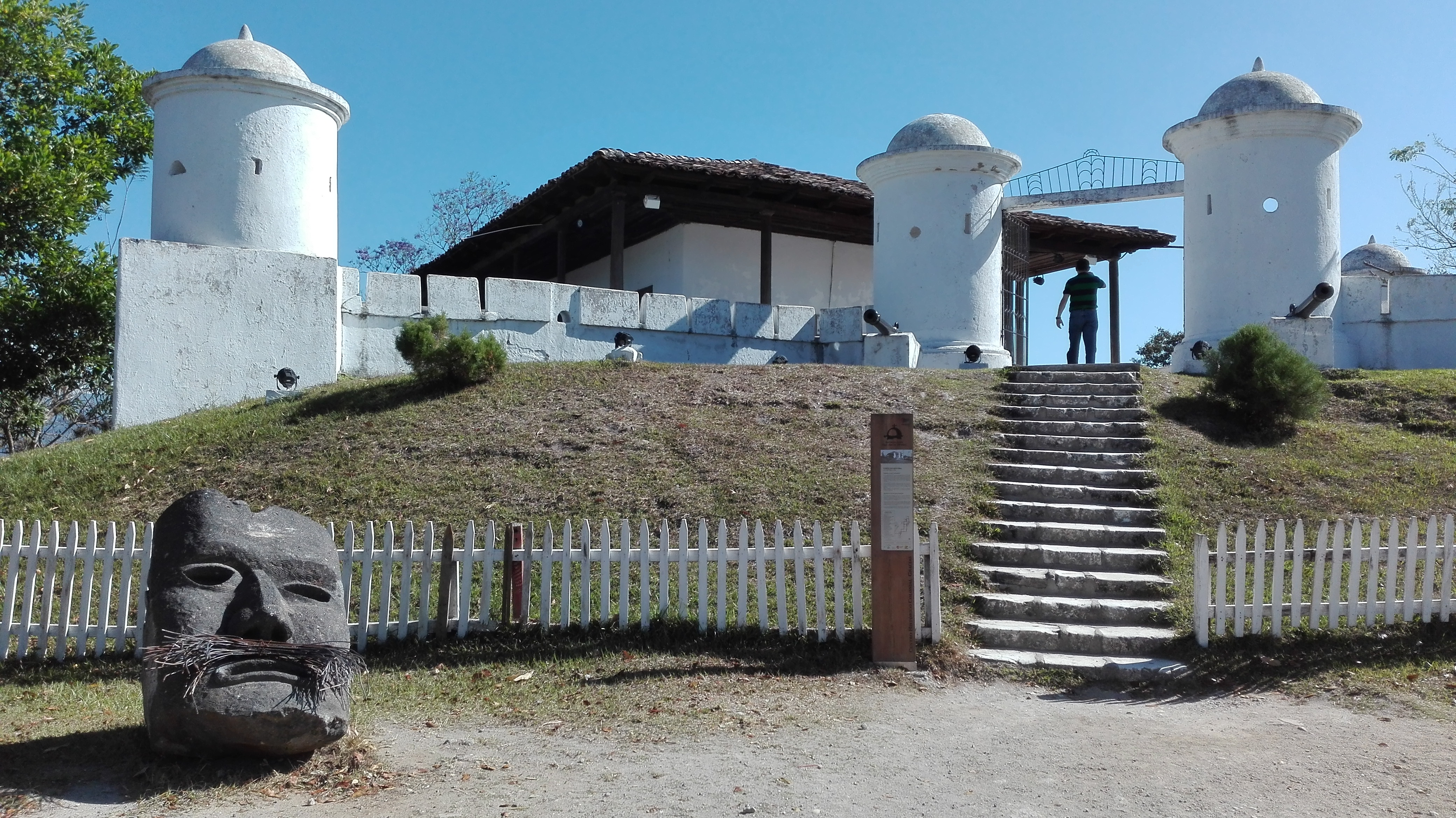
San Cristóbal Fortress

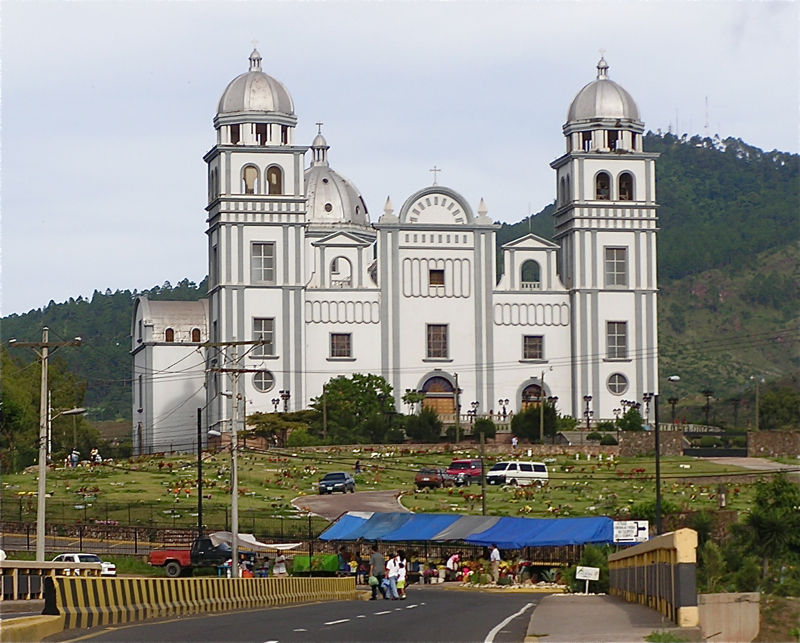
Our Lady of Suyapa Basilica

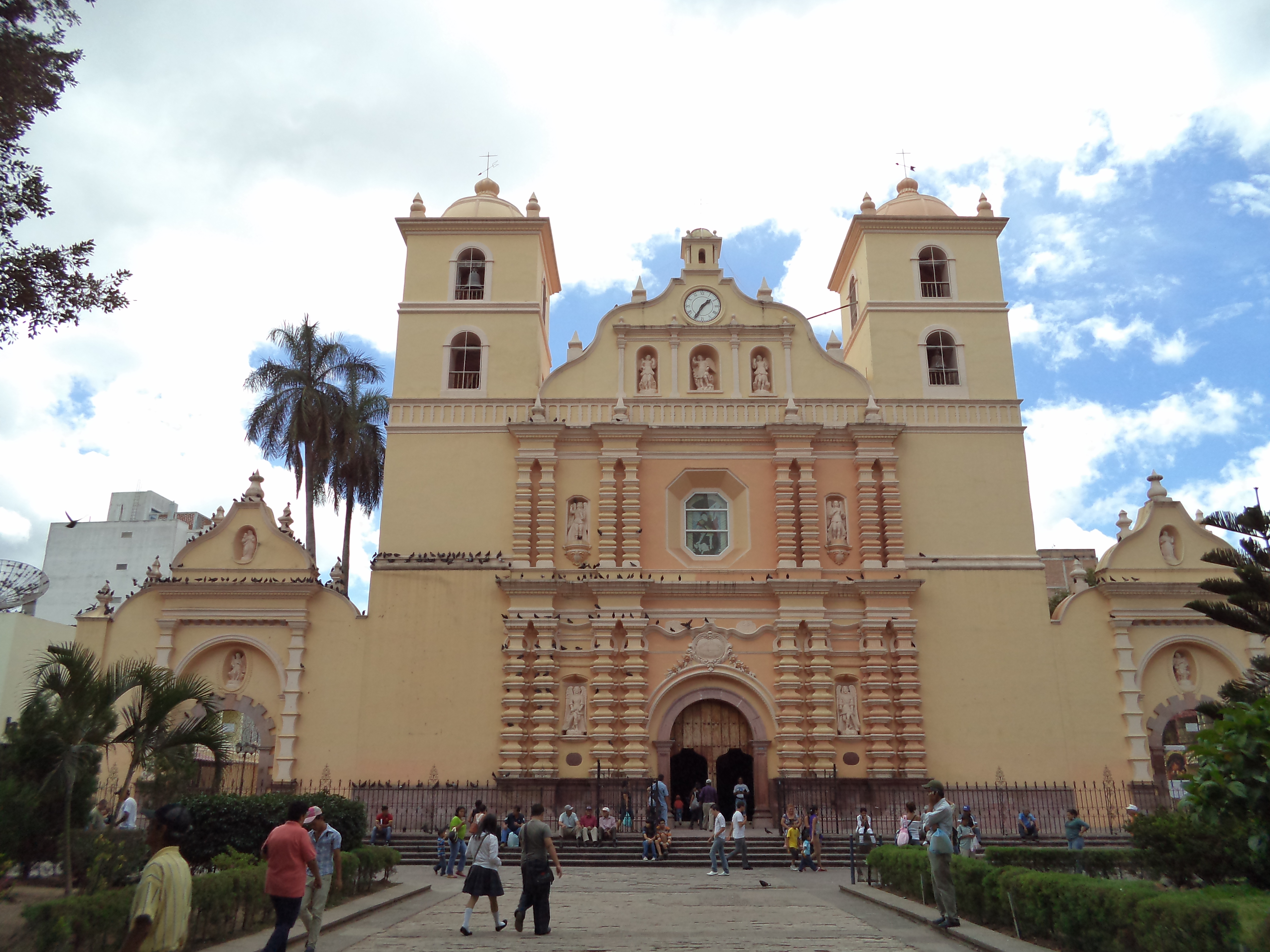
Tegucigalpa Cathedral

=== Coastal tourism ===
Honduras has several tourist spots on its coasts, including:

- Bay Islands
- La Ceiba
- Tela
- Puerto Cortés
- Amapala
- Lake Yojoa
- Omoa
- Cochinos Cays
- Trujillo

==== Gallery ====
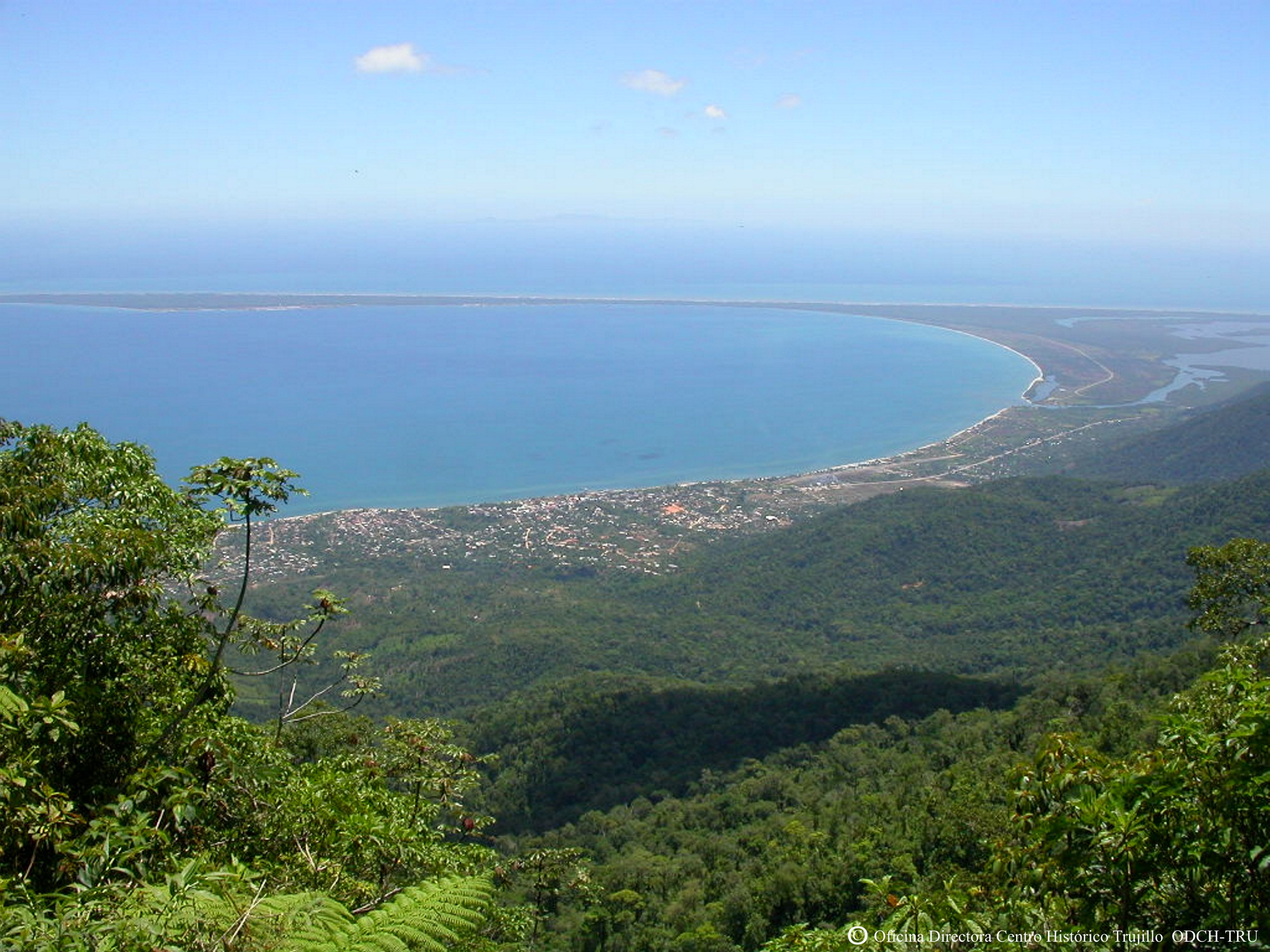
Trujillo coast line

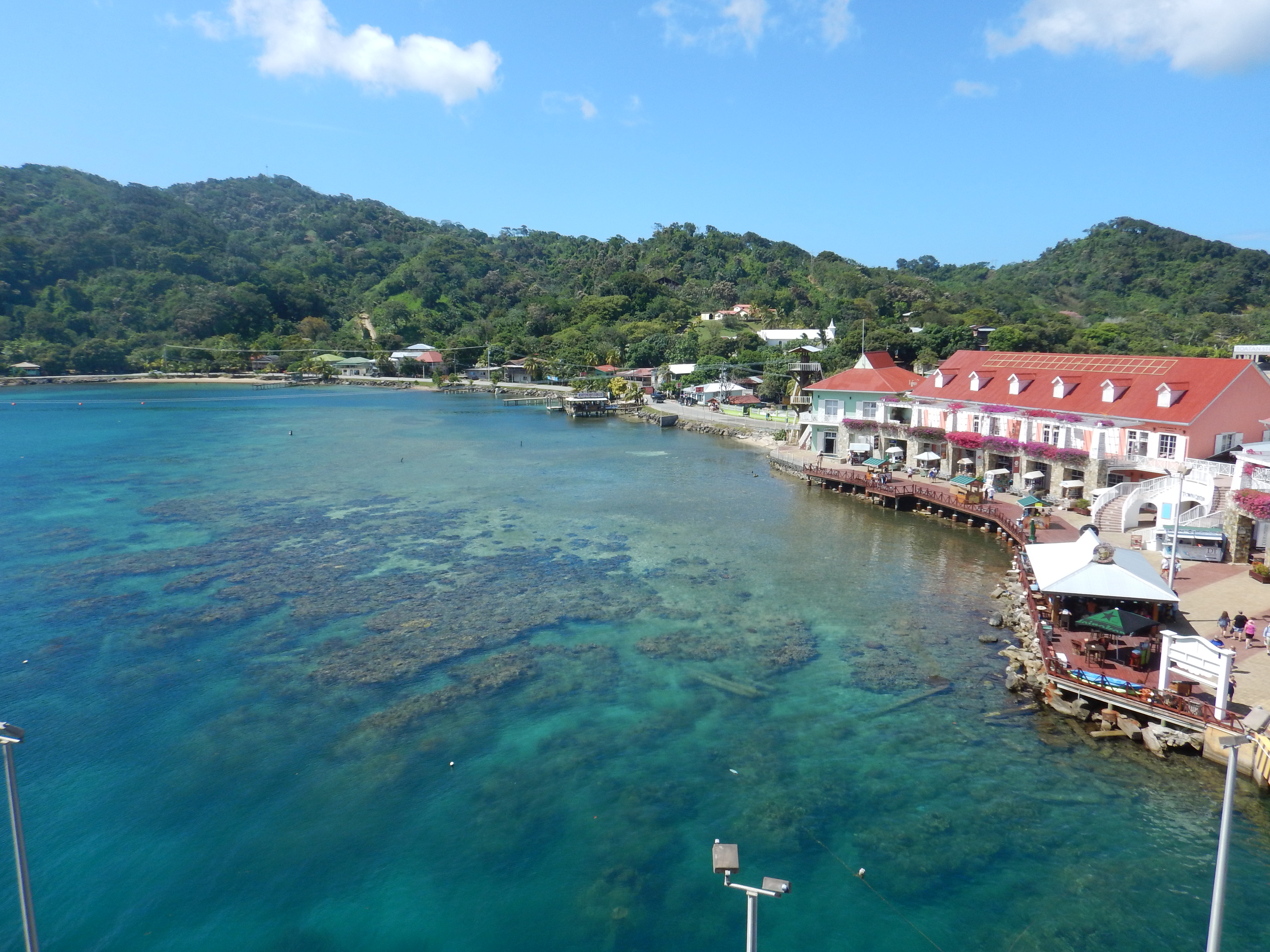
Coxen hole in Roatan.

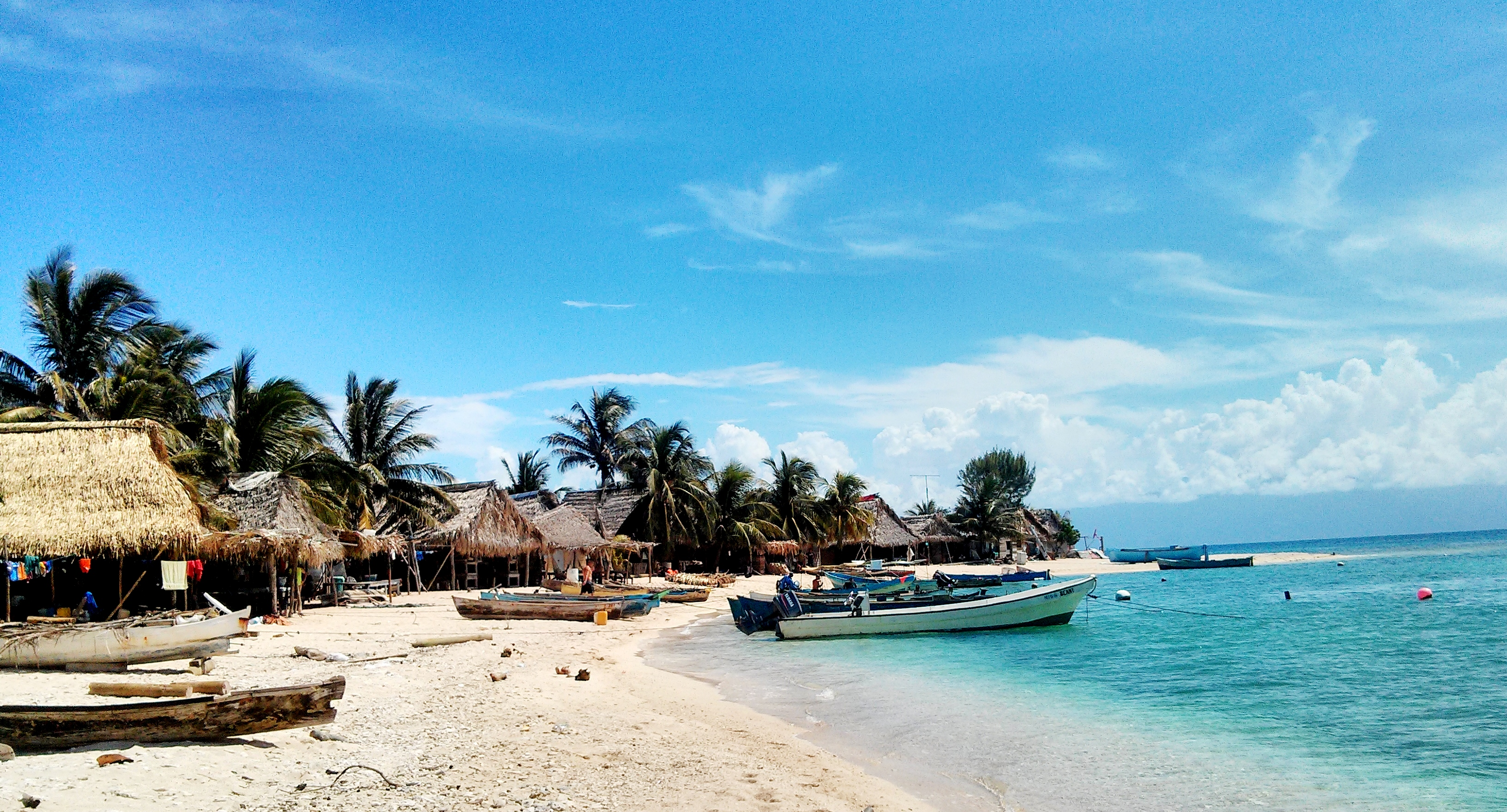
Beaches at Cayos cochinos in Chachahuete community.

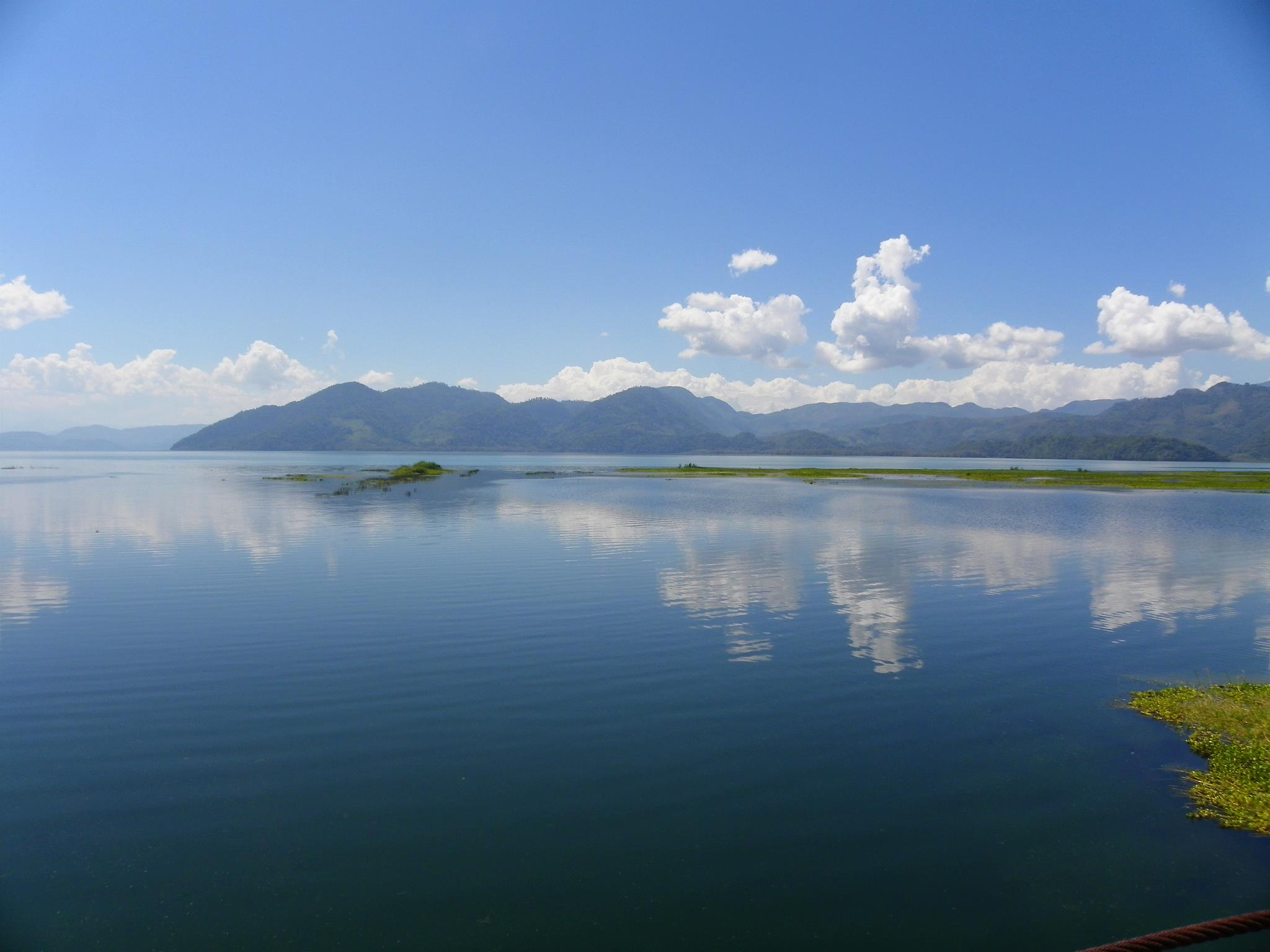
View of Yojoa lake

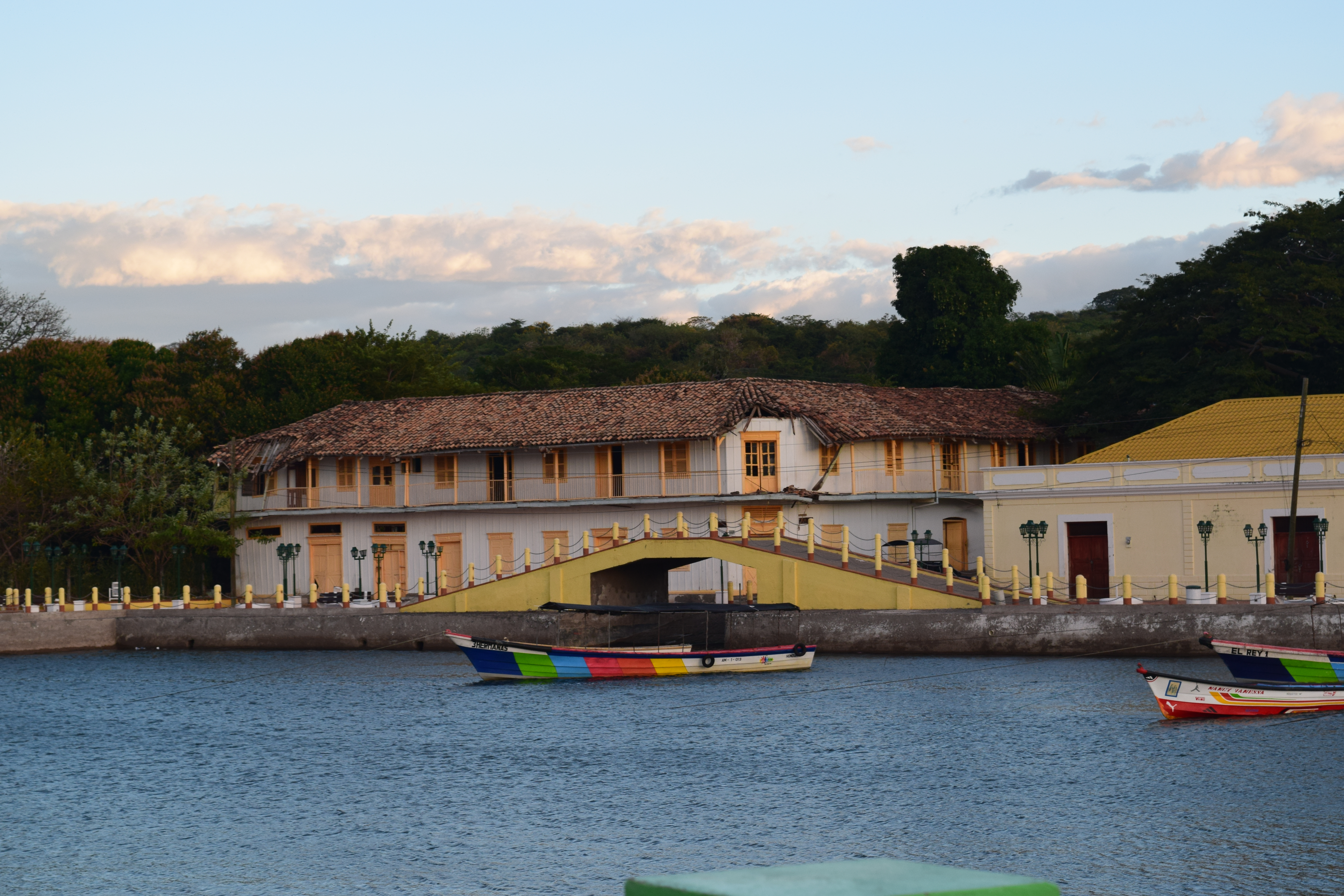
Port of Isla del tigre in Ampala.

=== Tourism to interior of the country ===
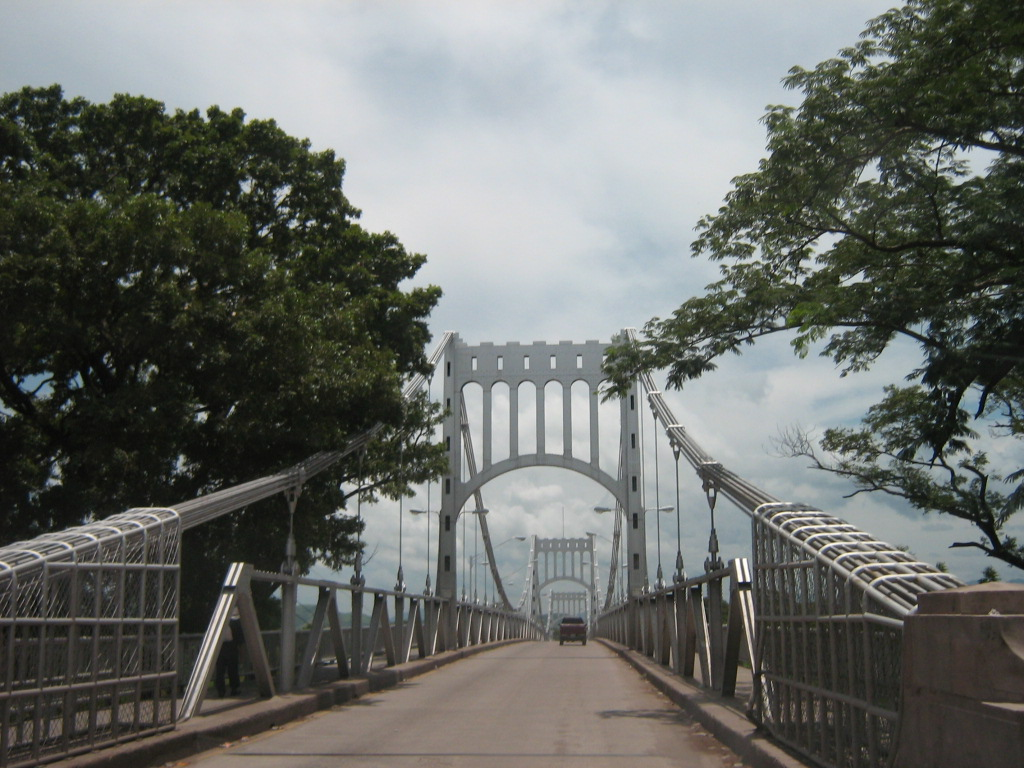
Choluteca Bridge

It also has places of interest to visit in the interior of Honduras, in the Honduran territory can be found in their municipalities, examples of the Baroque architecture of the Spanish colonization, churches that hold to the Christian tradition of making its temples in Latin cross, altarpieces, altars and images, evoke the colonial past.

- Tegucigalpa and Comayagüela,
- San Pedro Sula,
- La Ceiba,
- Comayagua,
- Choluteca,
- Tela,
- Santa Rosa de Copán,
- Siguatepeque,
- Gracias,
- Ojojona,
- Catacamas,
- Santa Bárbara,
- La Esperanza,
- Danlí,
- Juticalpa,
- Ocotepeque.
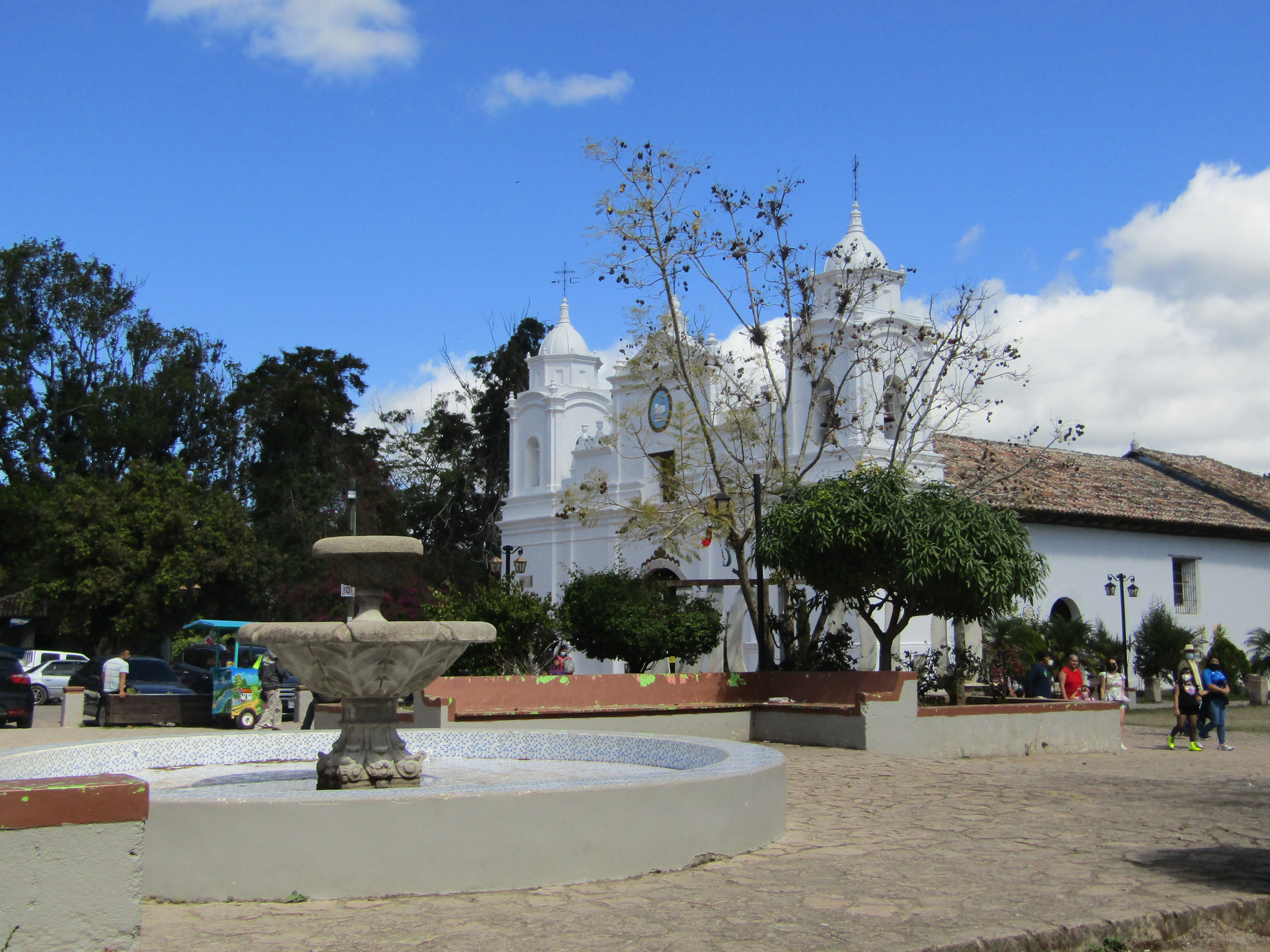
Town of Ojojona.

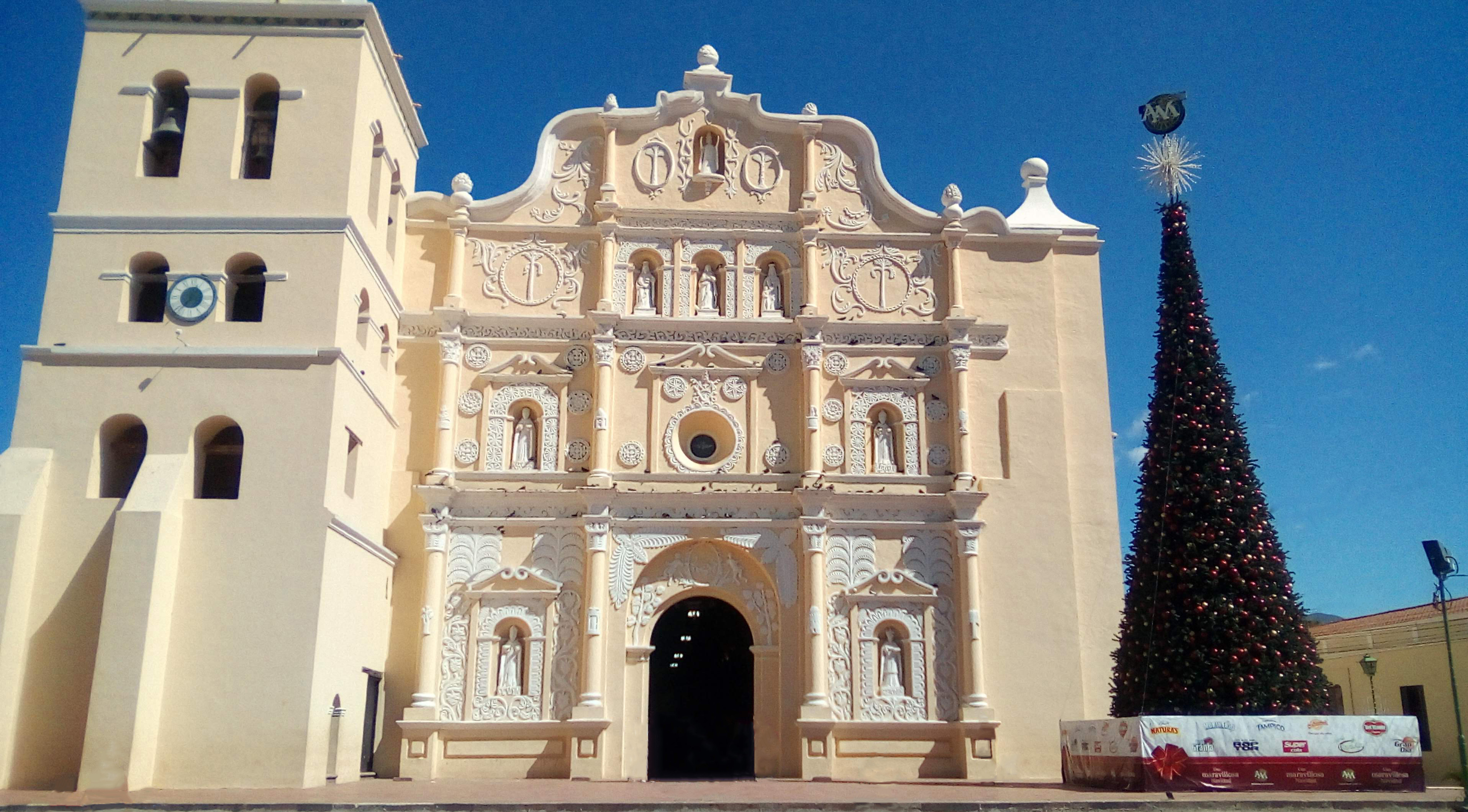
Cathedral of Comayagua.

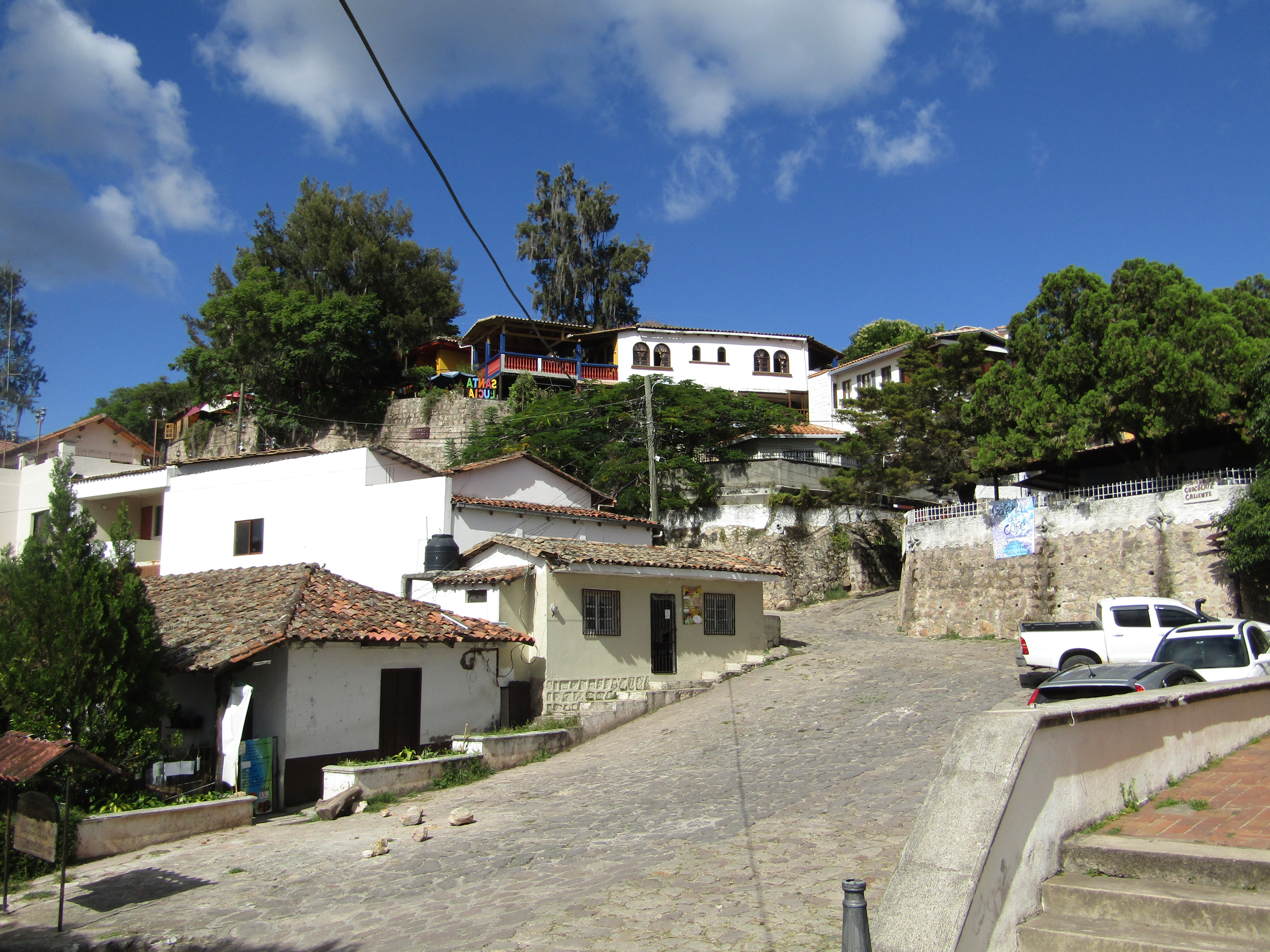
Town of Santa Lucia

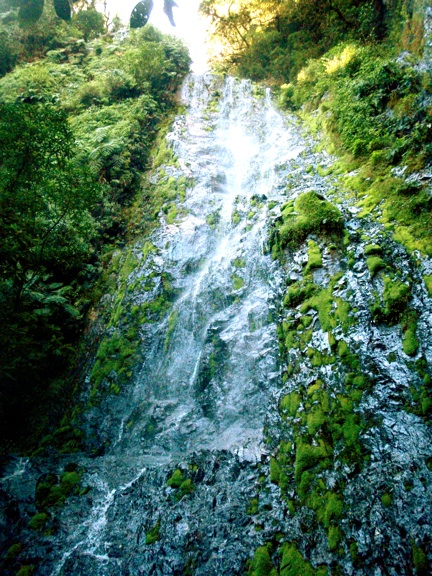
Waterfall at La tigra national Park

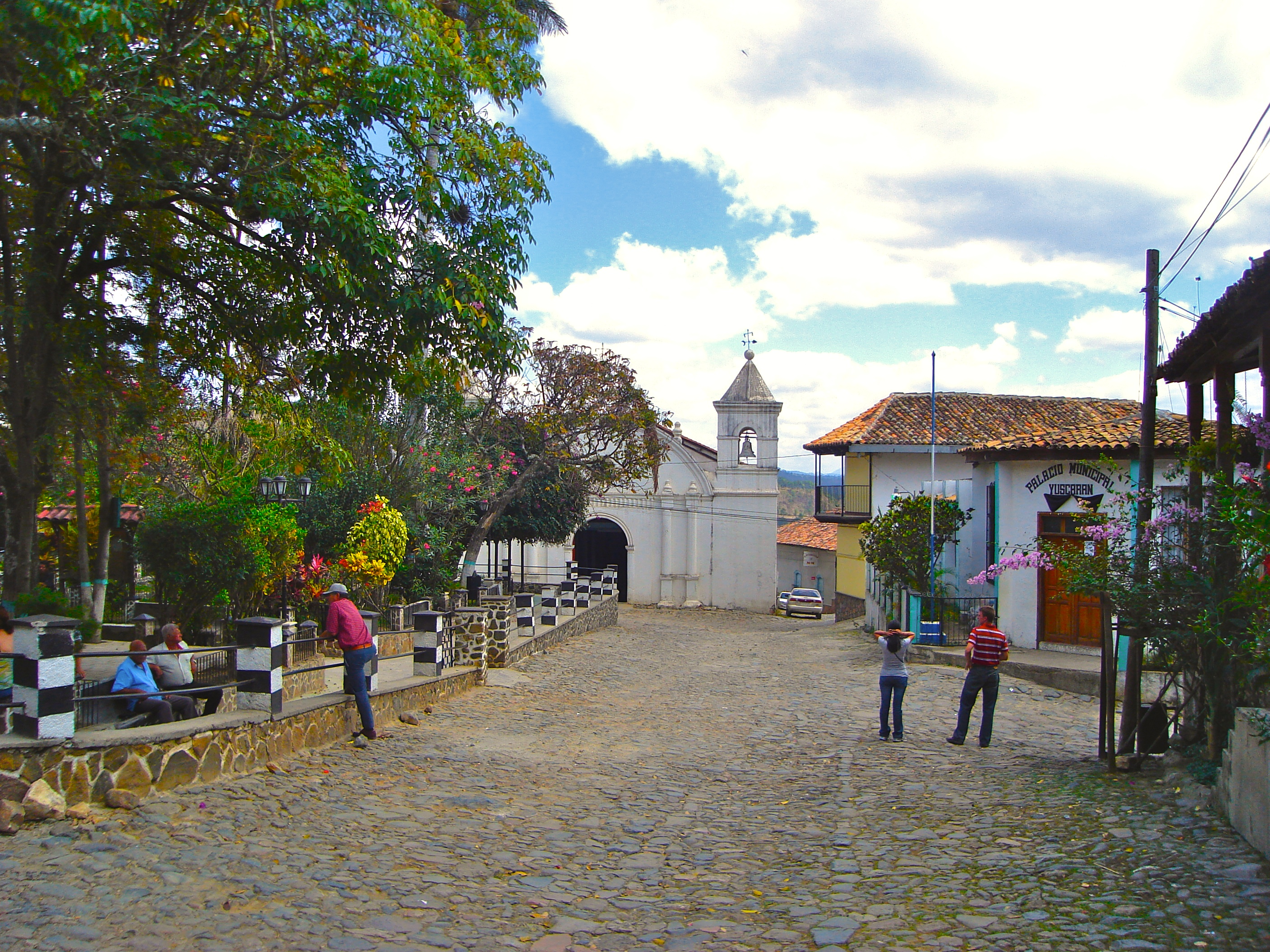
Town of Yuscaran

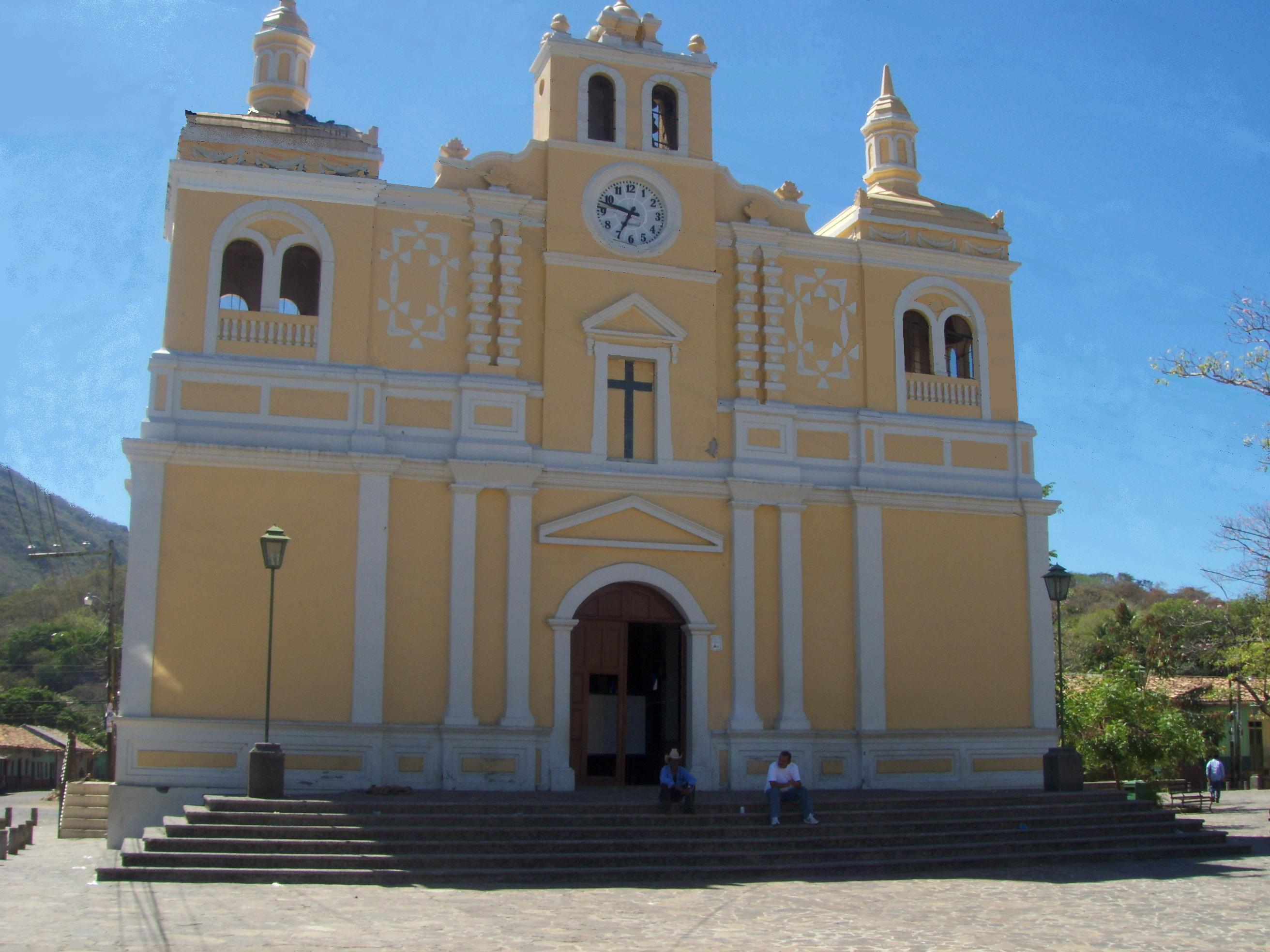
Cathedral of Amapala

=== Sports tourism ===
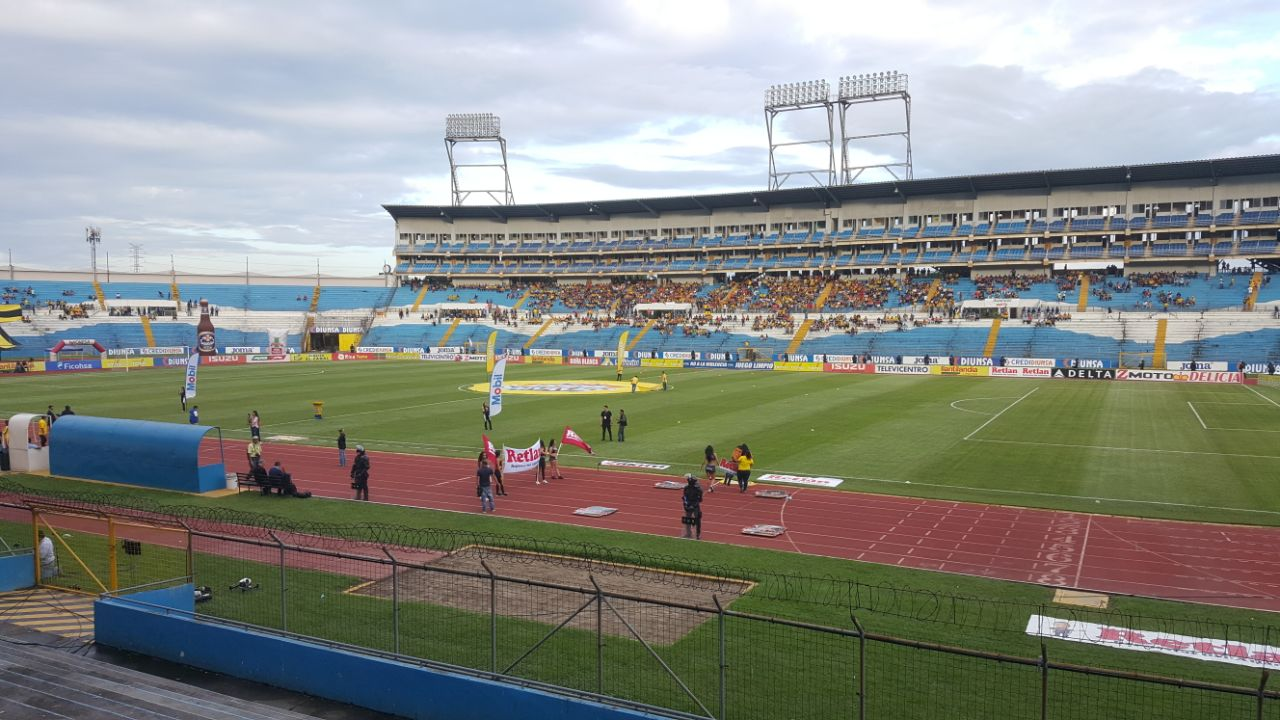
Olympic stadium of San Pedro Sula

Honduras is a country where sport is a daily element of daily life, the country has several stadiums and public sports facilities such as for football, basketball, baseball, tennis and swimming fields. The most popular sport at the national level is football, and Honduras has one of the best national leagues in CONCACAF, ranking 5th in the top 10 national leagues, its two most successful teams being Club Olimpia and Club Motagua. Their matches are the most watched nationally and the prices for the stadium entrance are accessible to both nationals and foreigners.

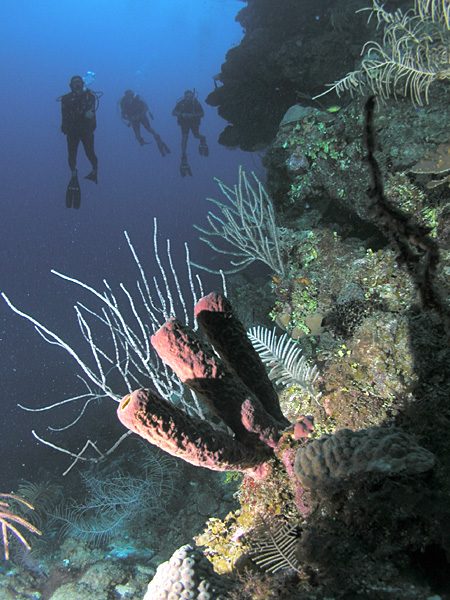
Scuba Divers in Honduras.

In Honduras, visitors can practice extreme sports like rafting, most famously at the Cangrejal river in La Ceiba. Other sports include jet ski racing and scuba diving, where visitors can observe coral reefs and explore sunken ships.

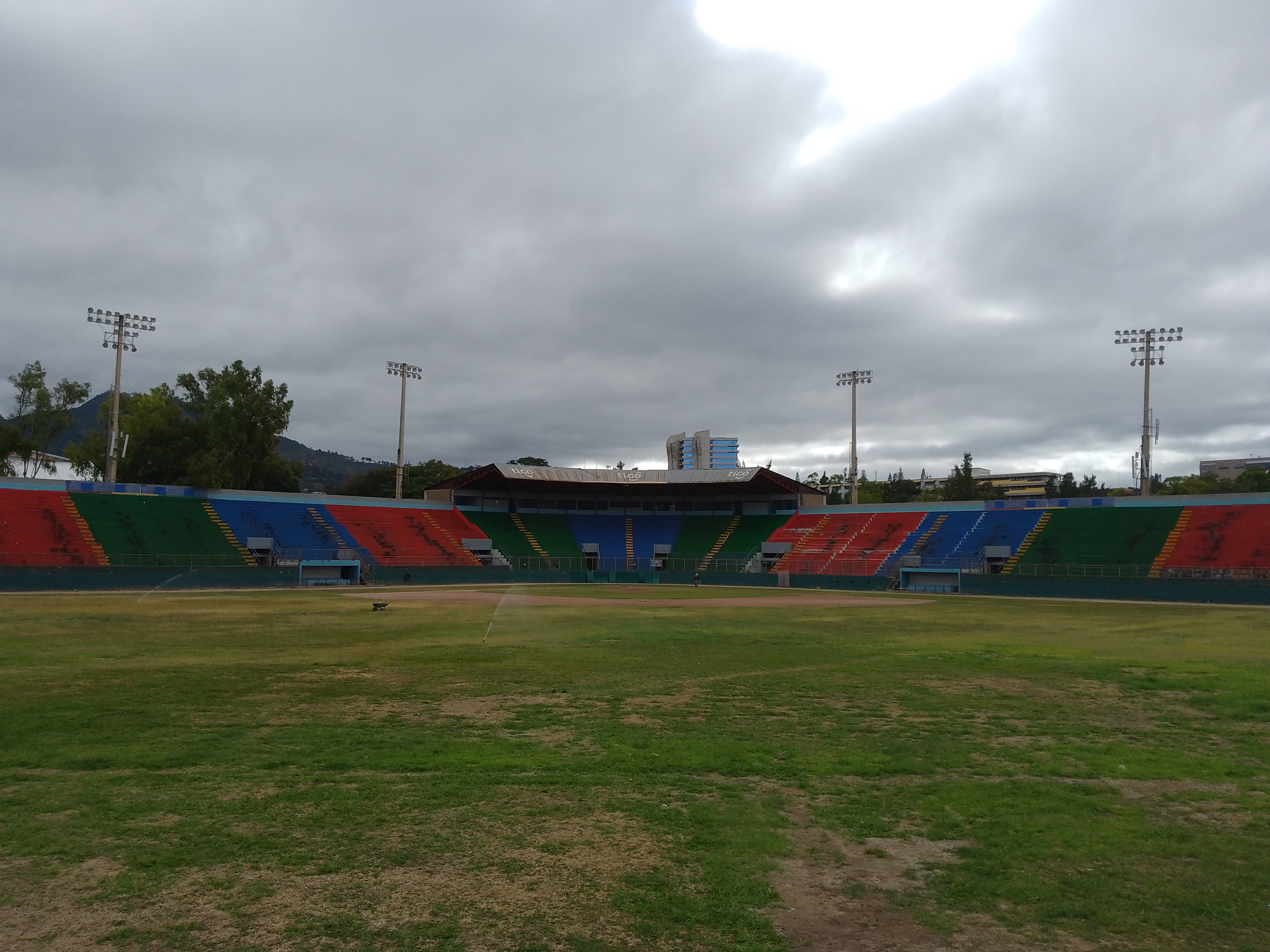
Choci Sosa Baseball field

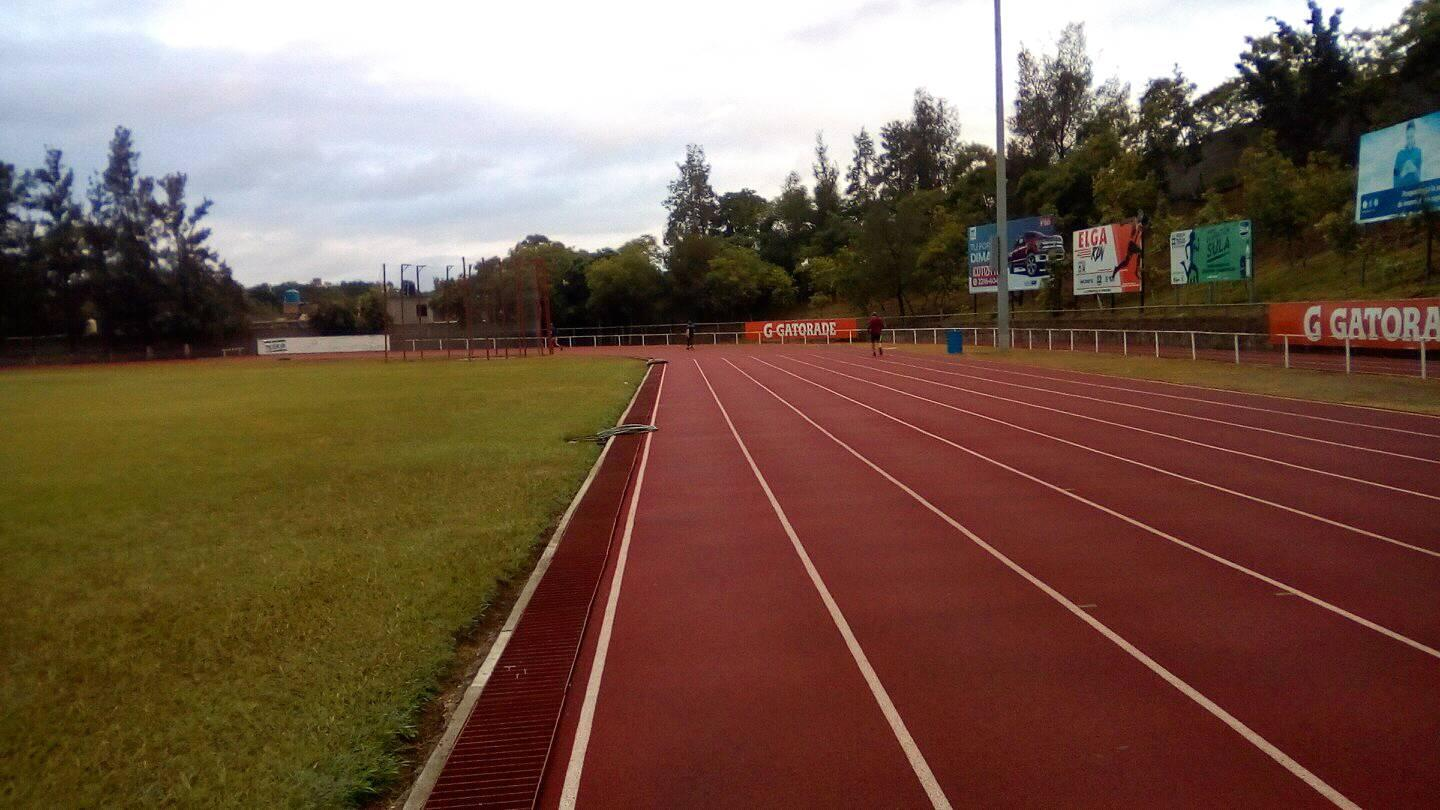
Villa olimpica field

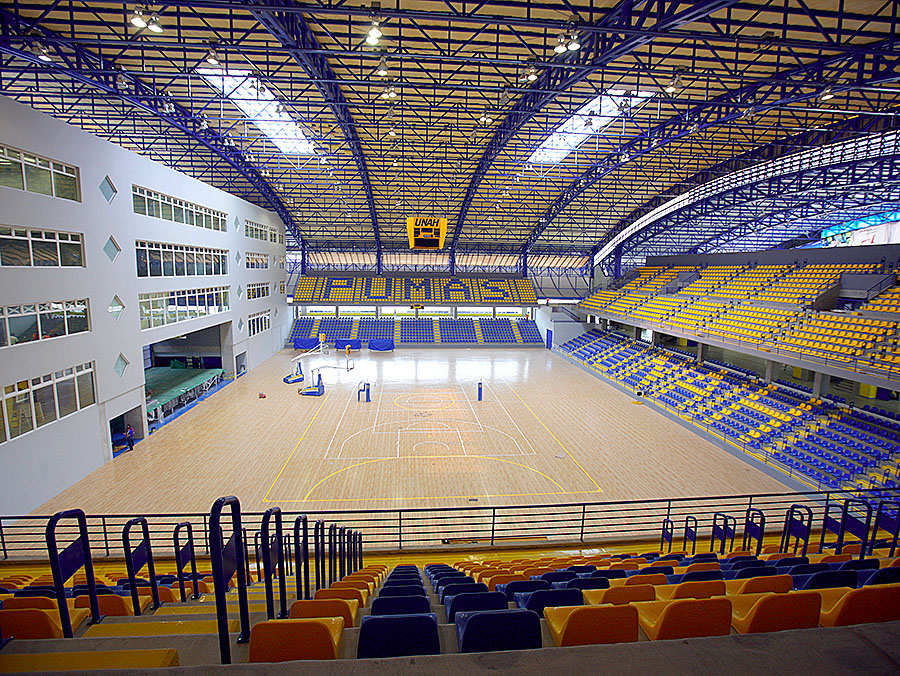
National Honduran University sports Center

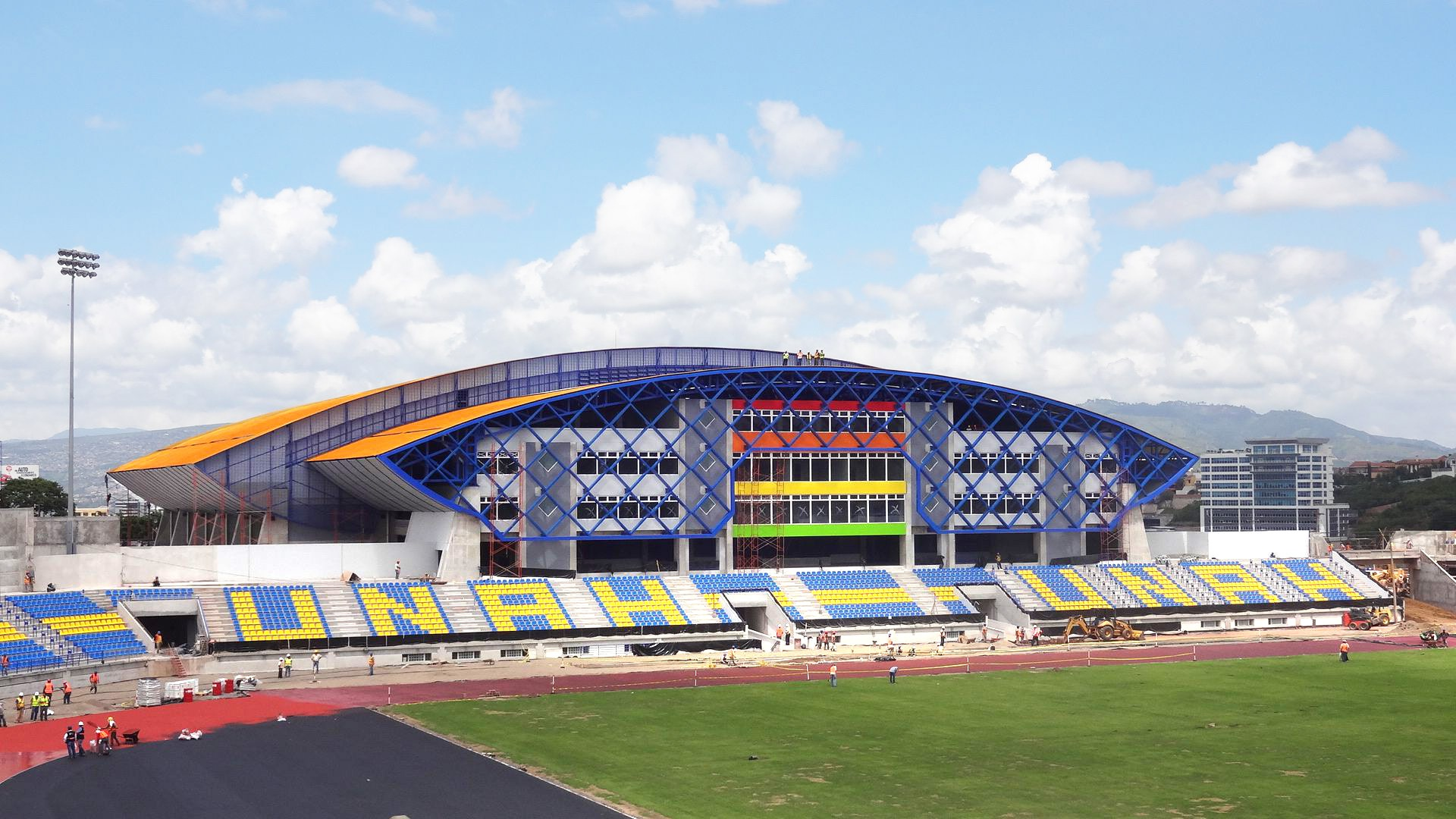
Olympic stadium and sportscenter of UNAH

== Climate ==
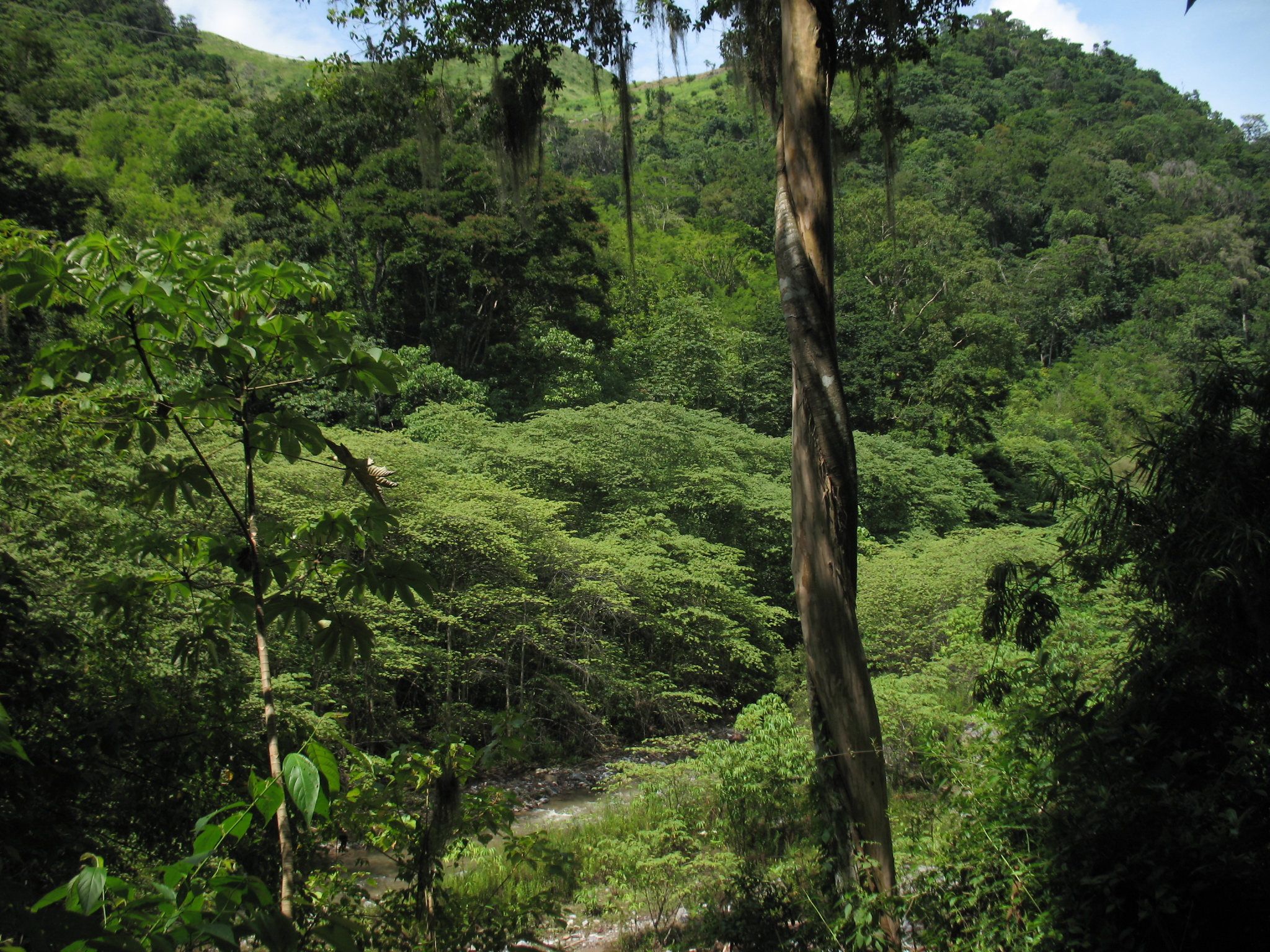
Most of Honduras has a humid tropical climate.

Another major attraction of Honduras is its tropical climate, has average temperatures above 18 degrees Celsius (64 degrees Fahrenheit) throughout the year, so it never frosts or no snowfall in the region, making it a paradise for tourists from countries of temperate zones.

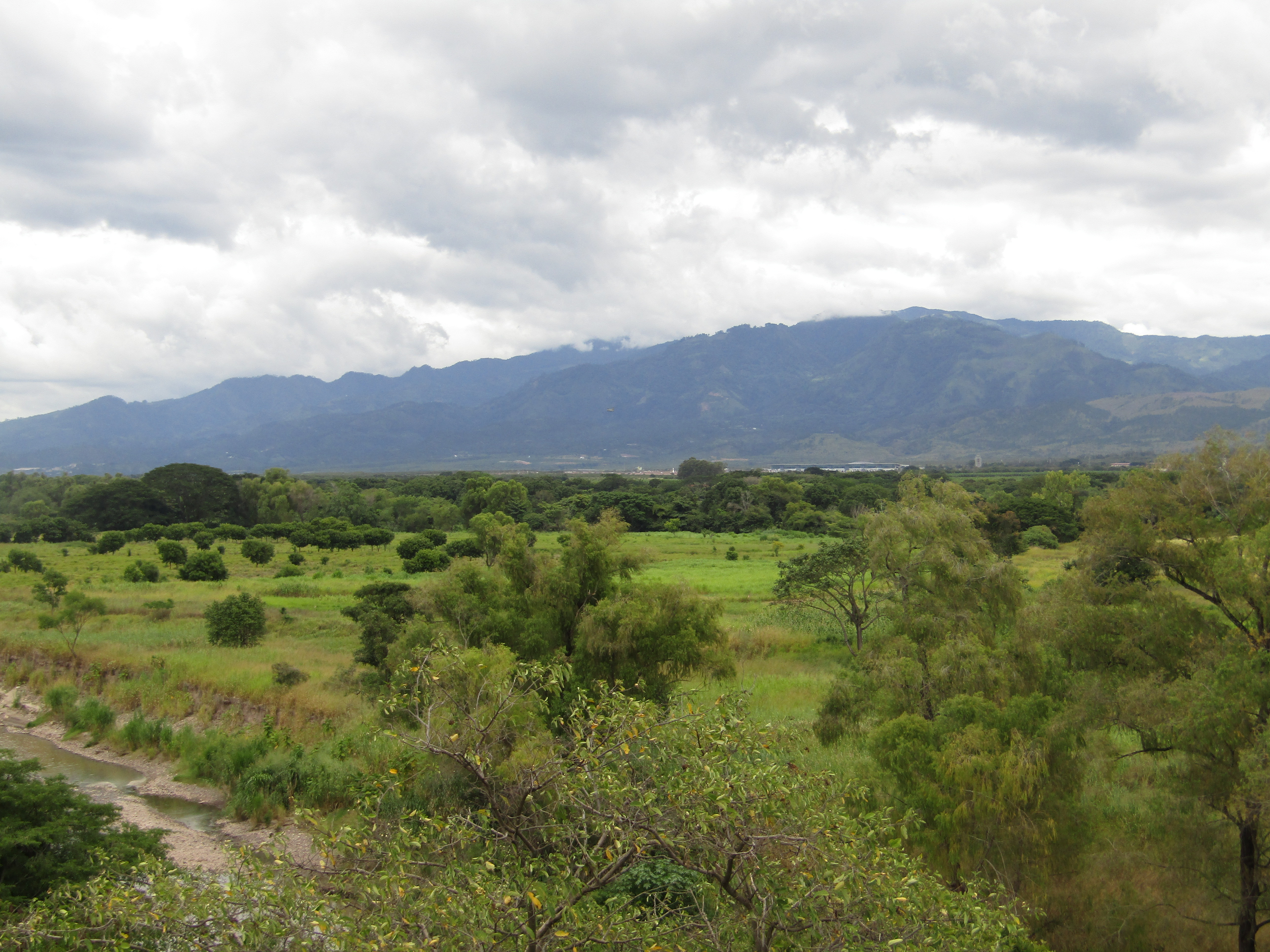
View to the Comayagua valley

In Honduras are two seasons, the rainy season between May and November and the dry season, between the months of December to April.

Due to its tropical climate it receives many visits of tourists from North America and Europe during winter between the months of December and March. Also it is visited by tourists from South America, Southern Africa and Australia in its winter months between June and September.

== Security ==
The country has the tourism police of Honduras (policía de turismo de Honduras) responsible for protecting tourists, also provides security the National Police of Honduras, the main contact number is 911. Also the police often have cooperation with Honduras Army.

- Places to go: Public Ministry of Honduras (Ministerio Público de Honduras), National Police of Honduras (Policía Nacional de Honduras), Honduran Red Cross (Cruz Roja Hondureña), Fire Department of Honduras (Cuerpo de Bomberos de Honduras).

== Infrastructure ==
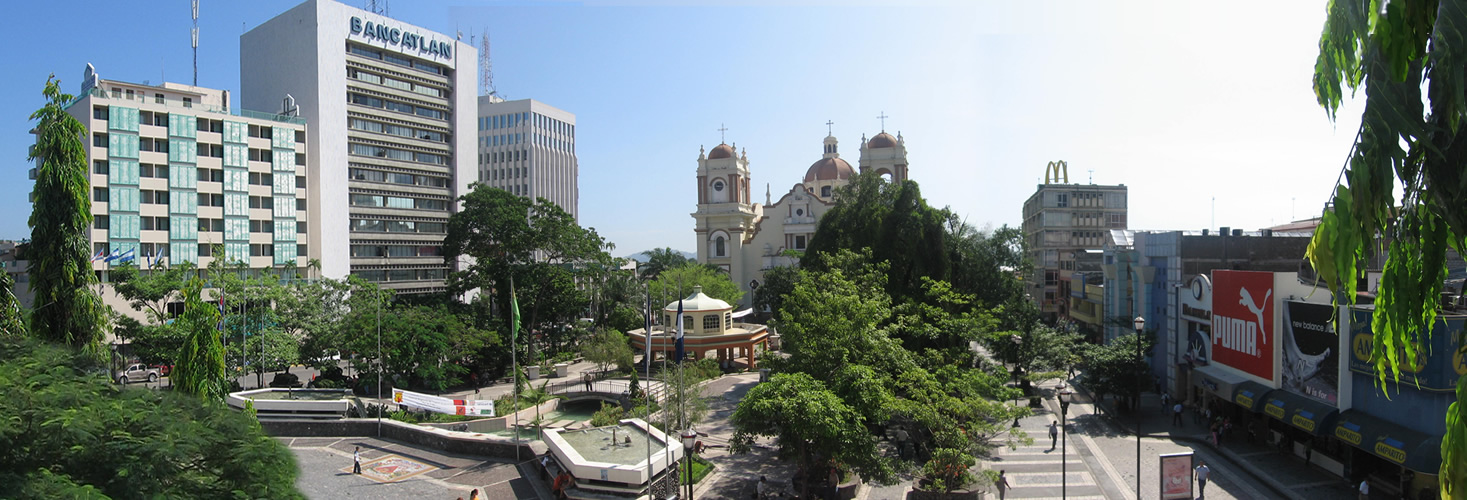
San Pedro Sula Down Town.

Honduras has an extensive hotel infrastructure in major cities, many 5 star hotels with swimming pools, cable TV, broadband internet, next to the beach.

=== Transport ===
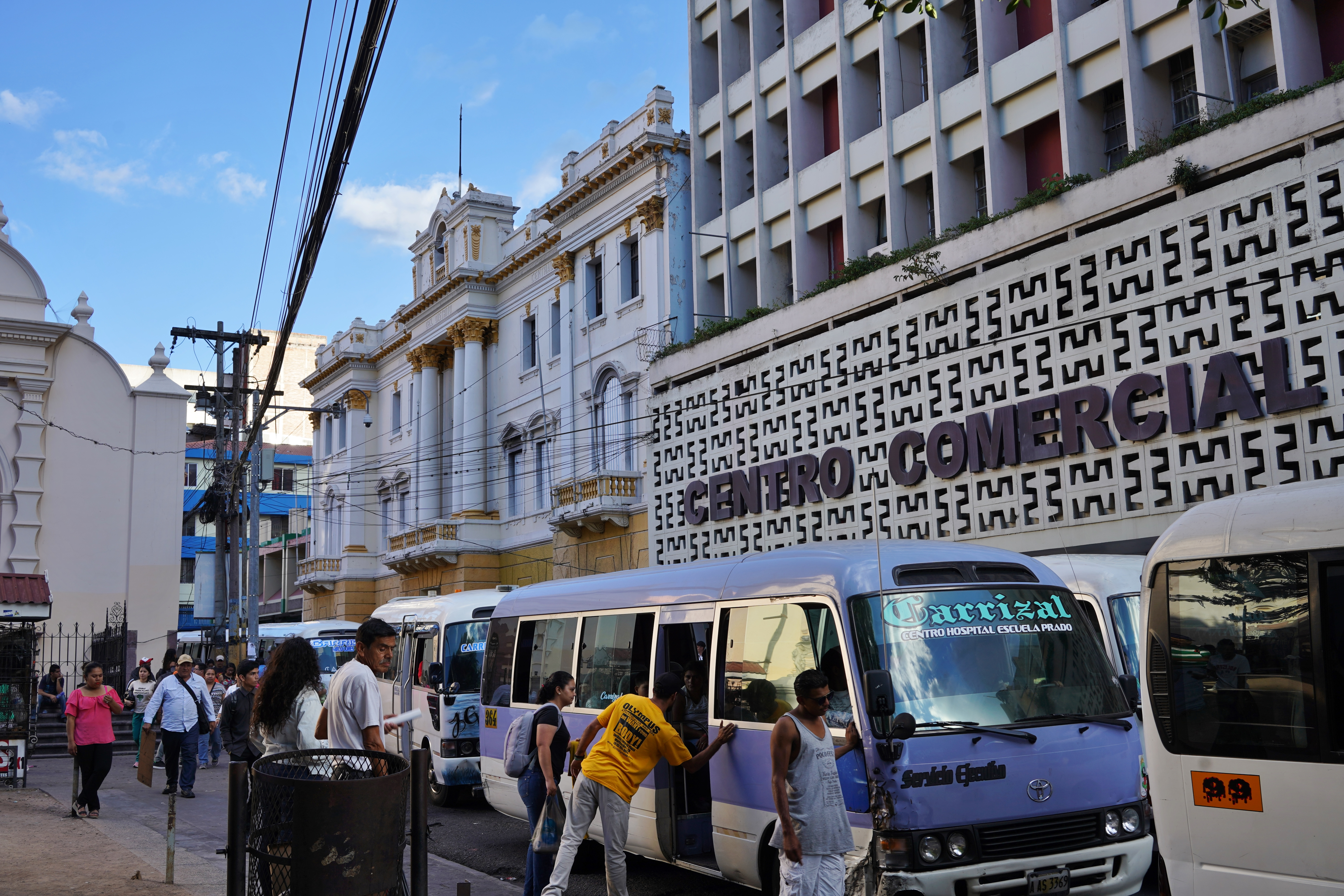
Bus public transportation in Teguciglapa.

Honduras has many means of transport to move nationwide, with several air routes connecting the country through its main airports, several international ports for receiving cruise ships and tourists. It also has broad highways that connect major cities and extensive network of roads connecting the other cities in the country and a railway system.

==== Aerial boom ====
It was after of World War I where it knew the benefits and versatilities of the aircraft and is as well as countries interested in forming an Air Force, also aeronautical engineers also viewed the ability to move people in such devices and so is designed that larger aircraft and in order to transport. In Honduras after the First Civil War of Honduras or “Revolución del 19” was the president in functions General Rafael López Gutiérrez who would be interested in buying aircraft for Armed Forces and turn that nationals obtain their title of airplane pilot, it happened that opened a flying school and sent to build airstrips, then the country and its main tourist cities had airports for transport of civilians, in the early 1930s opened the air mail and the trade routes, selling airline tickets in 1933 cost about 35 Lempiras.

==== Honduran railway ====
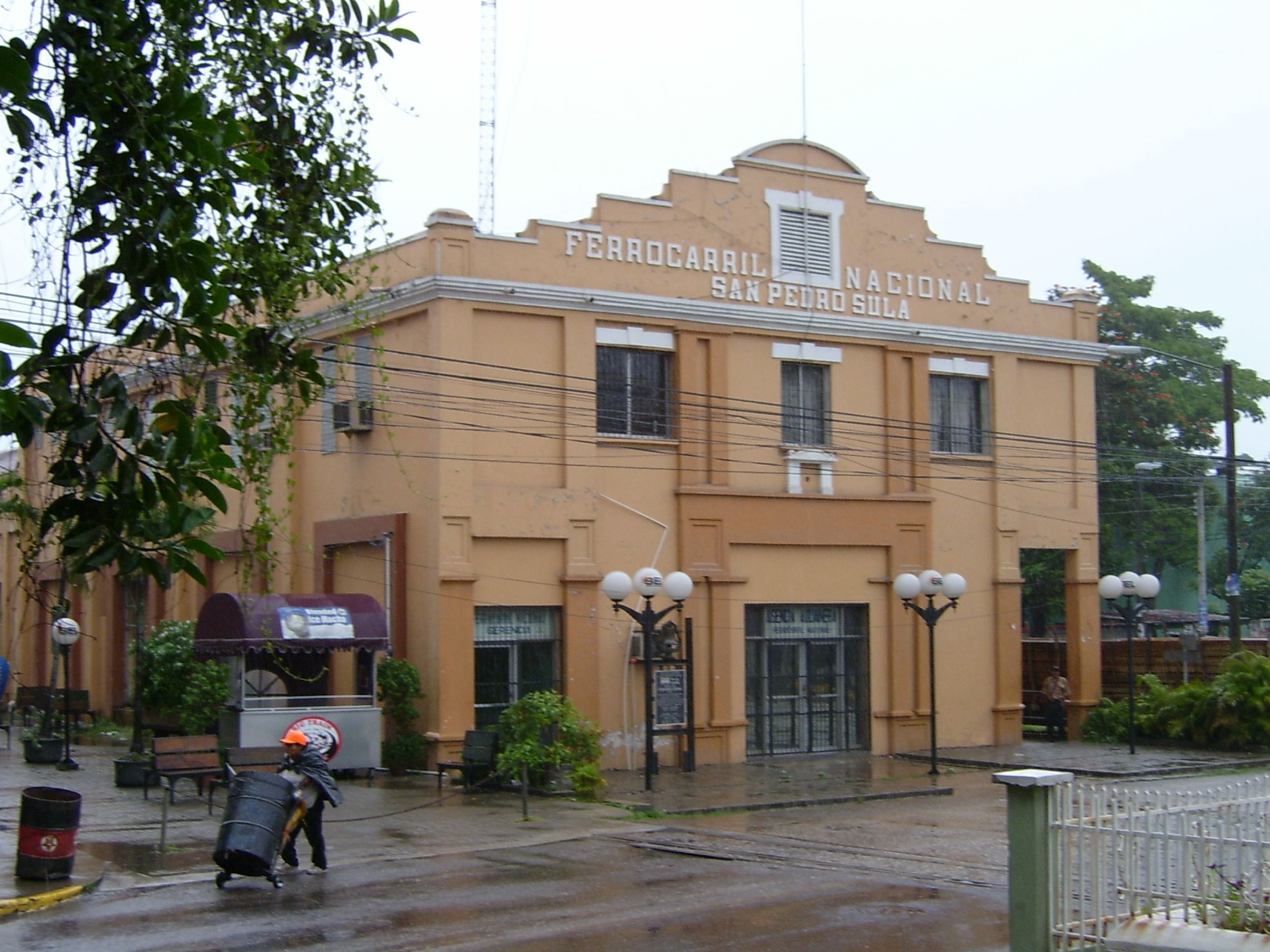
San Pedro Sula Train station

In the 20th century during the presidential administrations of the conservative Captain General José María Medina began with the works of National Railroad of Honduras, devised in the foreground both to unite the north coast to the south coast in the Gulf of Fonseca, but this work because of mismanagement and actors lost credibility and it entangled in a tremendous debt, the lines that were installed not become the planned and the project was stalled, so the banana companies it benefited to transport their products to the Honduran major ports. After the 1920s the train intended for civilians started to carry a modest tourist clientele, but, until recently, that was in a difficult economic position. However, the national railway has managed to restore some machines that transit San Pedro Sula. The railway service in Honduras is seen as more of a tourist attraction than as a means of transport.

==== Pan-American Highway ====
The International or Pan American Highway crosses the country, before it was in the middle of 20th century when it were sent to build the major highways in Honduras, joining the villages to the cities.

== Ministry of Tourism ==
Ministry of Turism Logo

The head of the Ministry of Culture, Tourism and Sports is responsible for ensuring the maintenance of tourism resources of the country, and to give the necessary attention and publicity in foreign countries, promoting and encouraging these resources in stands of international fairs of societies with greater economic acquisition. Similarly project to Honduran culture within social circles of the world, as national athletes who are the representatives of the distinctive and national colors in world sporting events.

== See also ==
- Secretariat of Foreign Affairs (Honduras)
- Culture of Honduras
- Visa policy of Honduras
- Mesoamerican Barrier Reef System
