= North American NA-64 Yale =

American export trainer aircraft

NA-64/NA-64 P-2/Yale
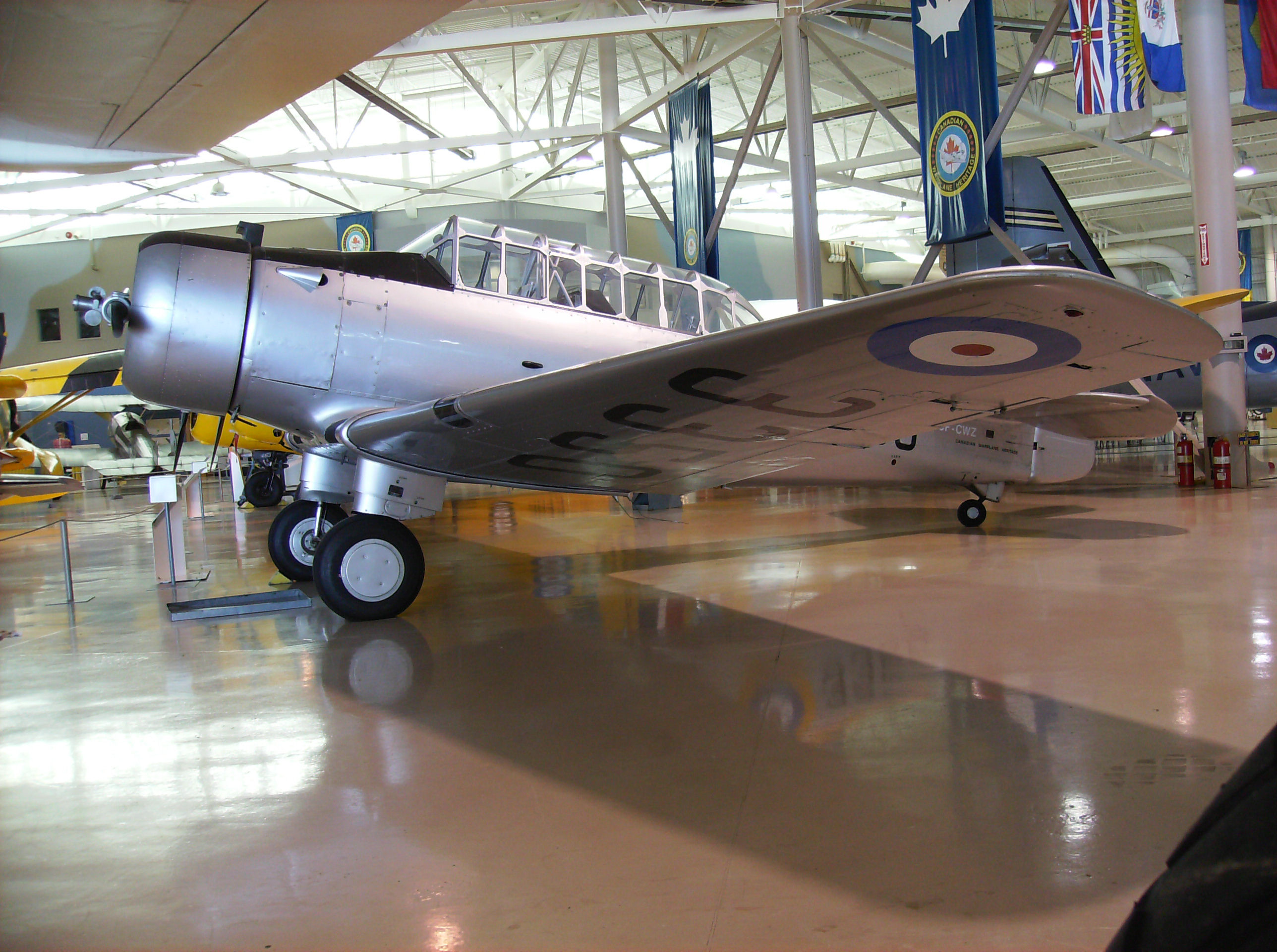
- Restored North American NA-64 Yale at the Canadian Warplane Heritage Museum in Hamilton, Ontario

General information
- Type: Trainer
- Manufacturer: North American Aviation
- Status: Warbird
- Primary users: Royal Canadian Air Force French Air Force; French Navy; Luftwaffe
- Number built: 230

History
- Manufactured: 1940
- Introduction date: 1940
- First flight: 12 February 1940
- Retired: 1 October 1946 (RCAF); 1949 (Armee de l'air)
- Developed from: North American BT-14
- Developed into: North American Harvard

The North American NA-64 (NA-64 P-2 or NAA-64 P-2 in French service, Yale in Canadian service) is a low-wing single piston engine monoplane advanced trainer aircraft that was built for the French Air Force and French Navy, served with the Royal Canadian Air Force, and with the Luftwaffe as a captured aircraft during World War II.

== Design and development ==
Ordered as a follow-on to the NA-57 as a two-seat advanced trainer, the NA-64 P-2/NAA-64 P-2 represented a major structural improvement, with a longer all-metal fuselage replacing the fabric covered fuselage of the NA-57. As well as metal skin replacing the fabric on the fuselage, the fin was changed from having a corrugated skin to being a smooth stressed skin structure and was moved slightly aft, lengthening the rear fuselage while the engine was moved forward to maintain the center of gravity. The rudder was also changed from the rounded shape used previously to one with a roughly triangular shape with the broadest part being at the bottom to improve handling at high angles of attack. In one respect however, it was a step backwards from its immediate predecessor, the BT-14, with which it is often confused, in that the earlier straight wings were used with the result that in RCAF service, when compared to the later and more powerful Harvard II it was flown alongside, it had different handling characteristics and lower performance.

== Operational history ==
=== France ===
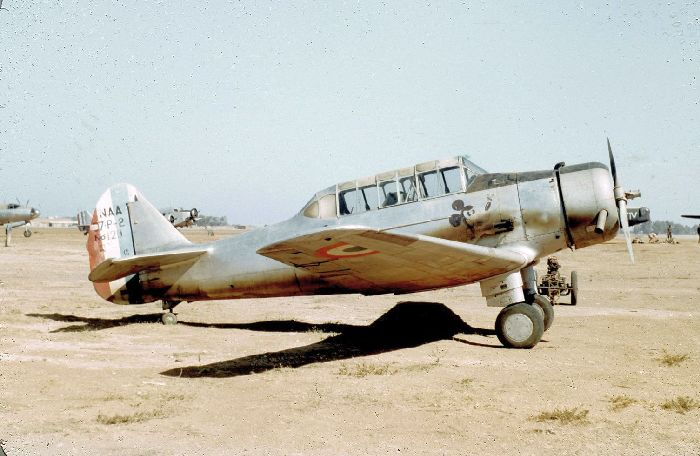
French Air Force NAA-64 in service after World War 2, in French controlled Morocco with a replacement rudder.

The NA-64 P-2 was built for the French Armée de l'Air and Aéronavale in 1939–1940, which ordered 200 and 30 respectively. Of these, 111 had been delivered before France surrendered to the Germans after the Battle of France. In France, the NA-64, like the NA-57 before it, was known as the North, and was designated as NAA-64 P-2 (abbreviated from North American Aviation modèle 64 perfectionnement, 2 places (North American Aviation model 64 advanced trainer, 2 seats)) but were sometimes attached to reconnaissance units. A small number escaped the Germans to be used by the Vichy French Air Force. Two examples in North Africa survived into the postwar years, having been operated alongside NA-57s, the last only being retired in 1949.

=== Canada ===
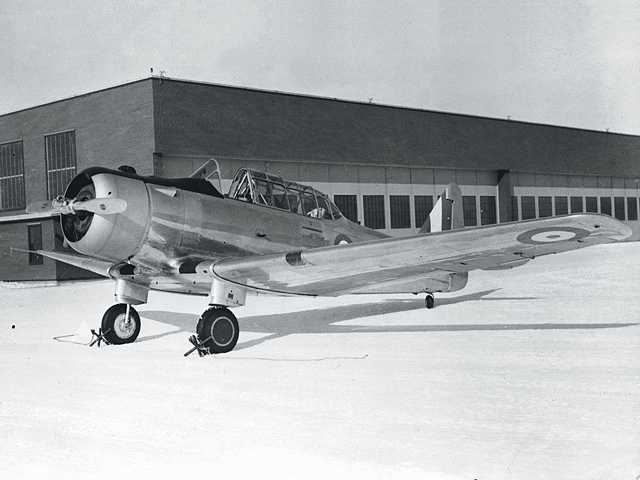
RCAF Yale shortly after being taken on strength as an intermediate trainer, at Camp Borden.

The remaining 119 undelivered aircraft were bought up by the British Purchasing Commission and transferred to the Royal Canadian Air Force (RCAF) for the British Commonwealth Air Training Plan between August and September 1940, and all were operational by November The type was named the Yale Mk.I (Note: As there was no Yale Mk.II, the Mk.I part of the designation was rarely used.) following British naming practice of naming trainers after education institutions and US-supplied aircraft after American locations, in this case, Yale University, and were used initially as intermediate pilot trainers taking pilots from the de Havilland Tiger Moth and Fleet Finch to the much faster and more complex North American Harvard, until this category was dispensed with as being unnecessary. They were then relegated for use as airborne wireless radio trainers, along with the contemporary Fleet Fort intermediate trainer in 1943. Prior to service entry, the throttle and engine mixture controls were modified from the system used by the French whereby the throttle was pulled back to increase power, and the mixture control pulled back to lean out the mixture, to the system used on the Harvard. The Yale appeared in the movie Captains of the Clouds. The RCAF sold all surviving examples off as scrap in 1946 but over 30 survive today as a result of a large number of them being bought surplus by a single farmer, with about 15 currently in airworthy condition.

=== Germany ===
The NAA-64s captured from the French were used by the German Luftwaffe for all types of flight training, from basic flying to advanced fighter tactics. Dive bomber schools and target tug units and even combat squadrons all used the NAA-64, as they were designated by the Luftwaffe, from the tail markings of the French examples. At least one was used by the Zirkus Rosarius to familiarize German aircrew with the handling of American aircraft before they evaluated captured aircraft.

== Operators ==
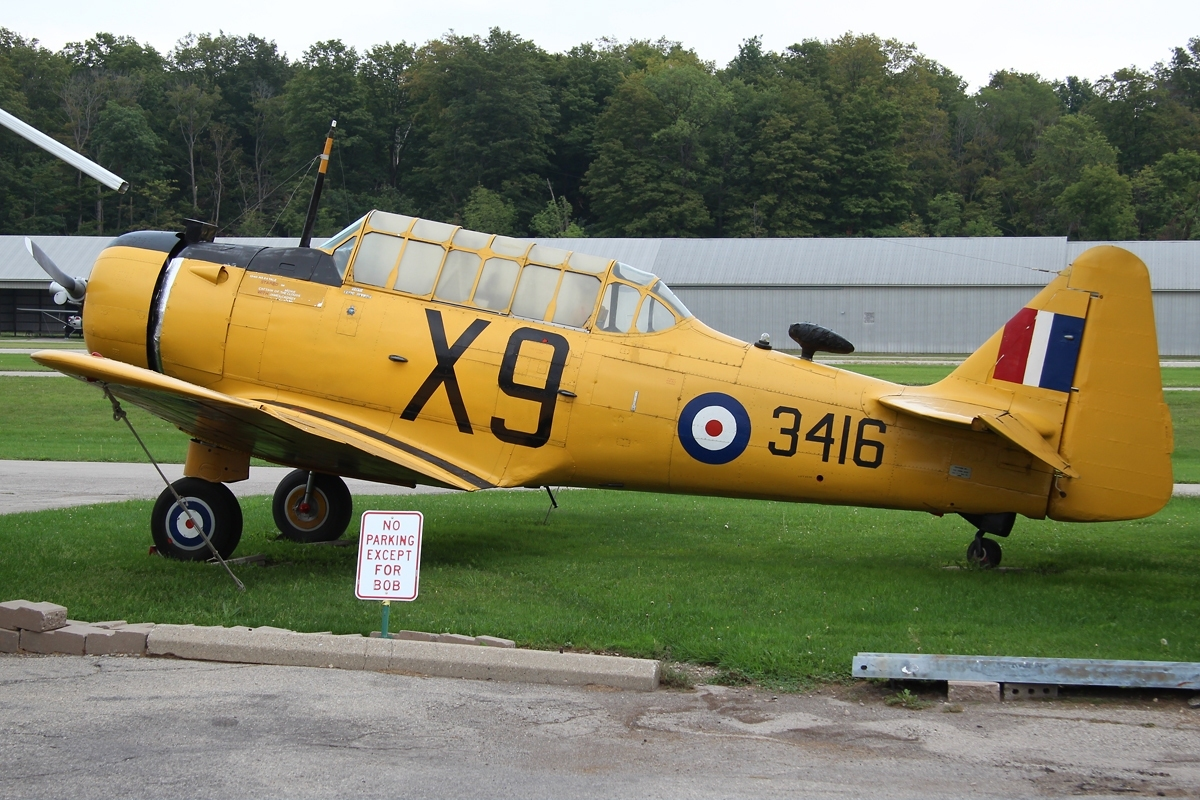
Yale 3416, which appeared in the movie, Captains of the Clouds

Canada

- Royal Canadian Air Force
  - No.1 Service Flying Training School (No. 1 SFTS) Borden
  - No.2 Service Flying Training School (No. 2 SFTS) Uplands
  - No.6 Service Flying Training School (No. 6 SFTS) Dunnville
  - No.14 Service Flying Training School (No. 14 SFTS) Aylmer
  - No.1 Training Command (1TC) Toronto, ON
  - No.3 Training Command (3TC) Montreal
  - No.4 Training Command (4TC) Regina
  - No.1 Flying Instructor School (1FIS) Trenton
  - No.1 Wireless School (1WS) Winnipeg, MB
  - No.2 Wireless School (2WS) Calgary, AB
  - No.3 Wireless School (3WS) Montreal, QC
  - No.4 Wireless School (4WS), Guelph
  - No.12 (Communications) Squadron
  - No.118 (Fighter) Squadron

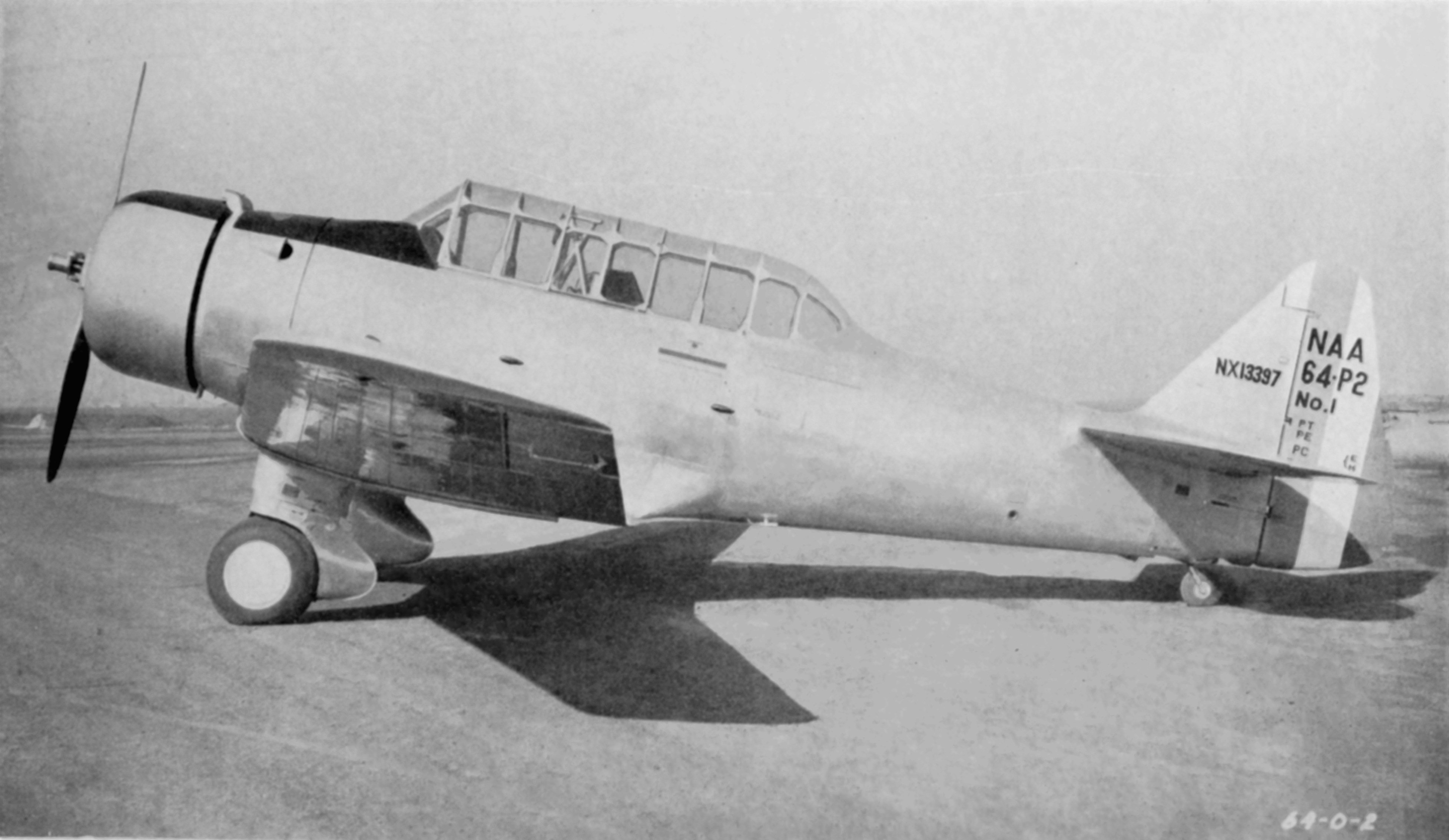
The first North American NAA-64 P-2 NX13397 before delivery. Due to the fall of France, this aircraft was instead delivered to Canada as a Yale Mk.I, and still exists.

France

- French Air Force (Armée de l'Air)
  - Escadrille d'Outre Mer 82 Niger (post-WWII)
- French Navy (Marine Nationale)
  - French Naval Aviation (Aéronavale)
    - Section Liaison Port Lyautey 51 S squadron (Khouribga)

Vichy France

- Vichy French Air Force (Armée de l'Air de Vichy)
  - Groupe de Chasse II/9 (fighter-trainer) – Aulnat

Free France

- Free French Air Force (Forces Aériennes Françaises Libres)s

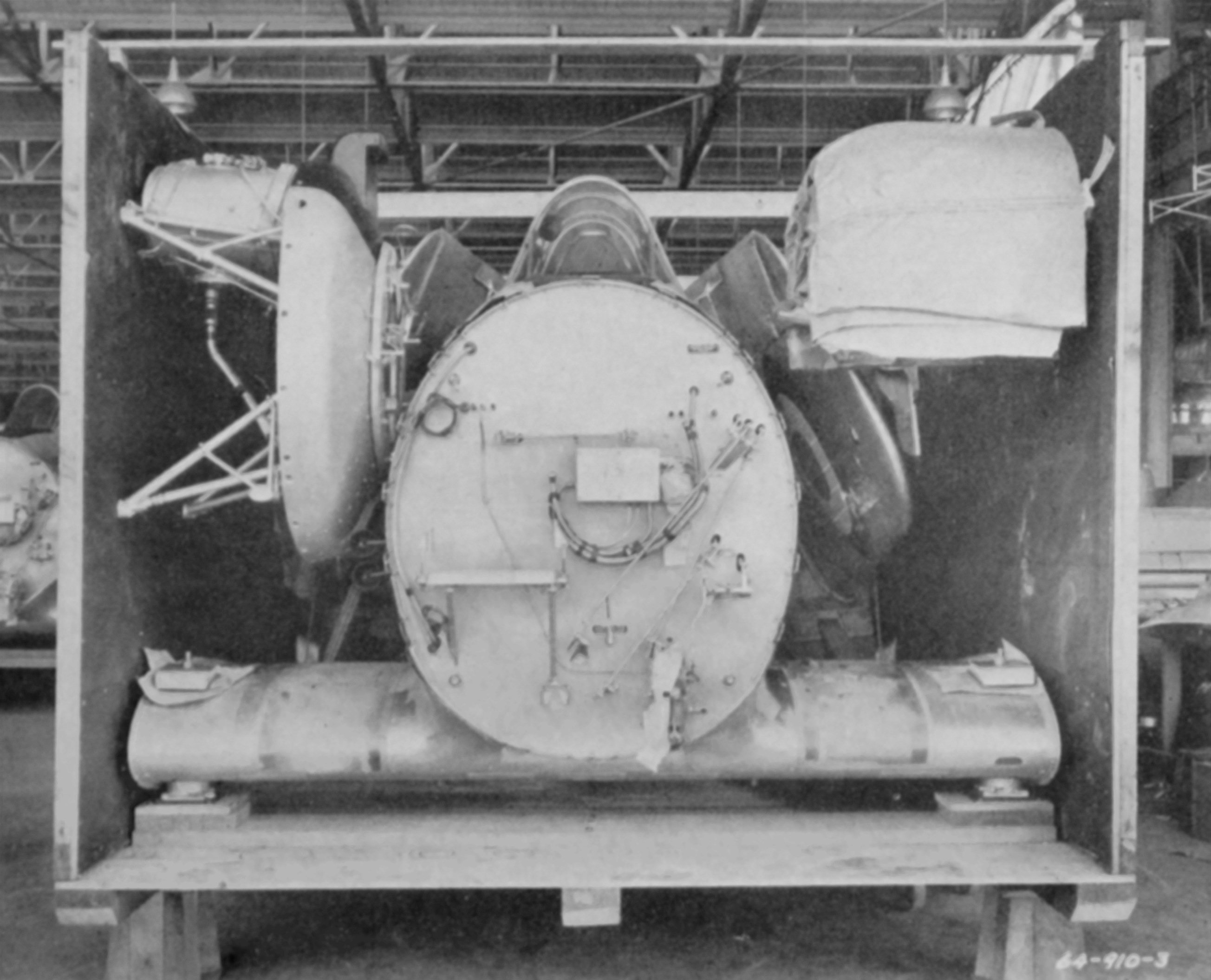
North American NAA-64 in its shipping crate for delivery to France. Most of those that made it to France had not even been unpacked when the Germans overran northern France.

Nazi Germany

- Luftwaffe captured 93 aircraft and assigned 96 registrations, and they published their own pilots manual for it
  - Fliegerzielgeschwader Fl.Z.G. 2 target towing wing
  - Flugzeugführerschule A/B 9 pilot school
  - Flugzeugführerschule A/B 16 pilot school
  - Flugzeugführerschule A/B 42 pilot school
  - Flugzeugführerschule A/B 43 pilot school
  - Flugzeugführerschule A/B 71 pilot school
  - Flugzeugführerschule A/B 82 pilot school
  - Flugzeugführerschule A/B 110 pilot school
  - Flugzeugführerschule A/B 111 pilot school
  - Flugzeugführerschule A/B 116 Göppingen pilot school
  - Flugzeugführerschule A/B 117 pilot school
  - Jagdfliegerschule JFS 2 Neustadt Weinstraße/Speyerdorf advanced fighter pilot school
  - Jagdfliegerschule JFS 6 advanced fighter pilot training school
  - Jagdfliegervorschule JFVS 2 Lachen-Speyerdorf preliminary fighter pilot school
  - Jagdgeschwader JG 103 fighter squadron
  - Jagdgeschwader JG 106 fighter squadron
  - Luftdienst-Kommando 7 air service command
  - Luftkriegschule LKS 1 air war school
  - Luftkriegschule LKS 5 air war school
  - Nahaufklärungsgeschwader NAG 102 short-range reconnaissance wing
  - Stukaschule StS 1 Wertheim dive bomber school
  - Sturzkampffliegervorschule StVS 1 Bad Aibling preliminary dive bomber school
  - Stukavorschule SVS 2 preliminary dive bomber school
  - Zerstörerschule ZS 1 Neubiberg heavy fighter school
  - Zieldarstellungsstaffel ZD-Stf 102 target towing squadron
  - Zirkus Rosarius used to familiarize aircrew with U.S. aircraft.

United Kingdom

- Royal Navy
  - 31 SFTS Kingston, ON (Canada) – eight loaned from RCAF from March to April 1941 in exchange for eight Fairey Battle trainers.

== Surviving aircraft ==
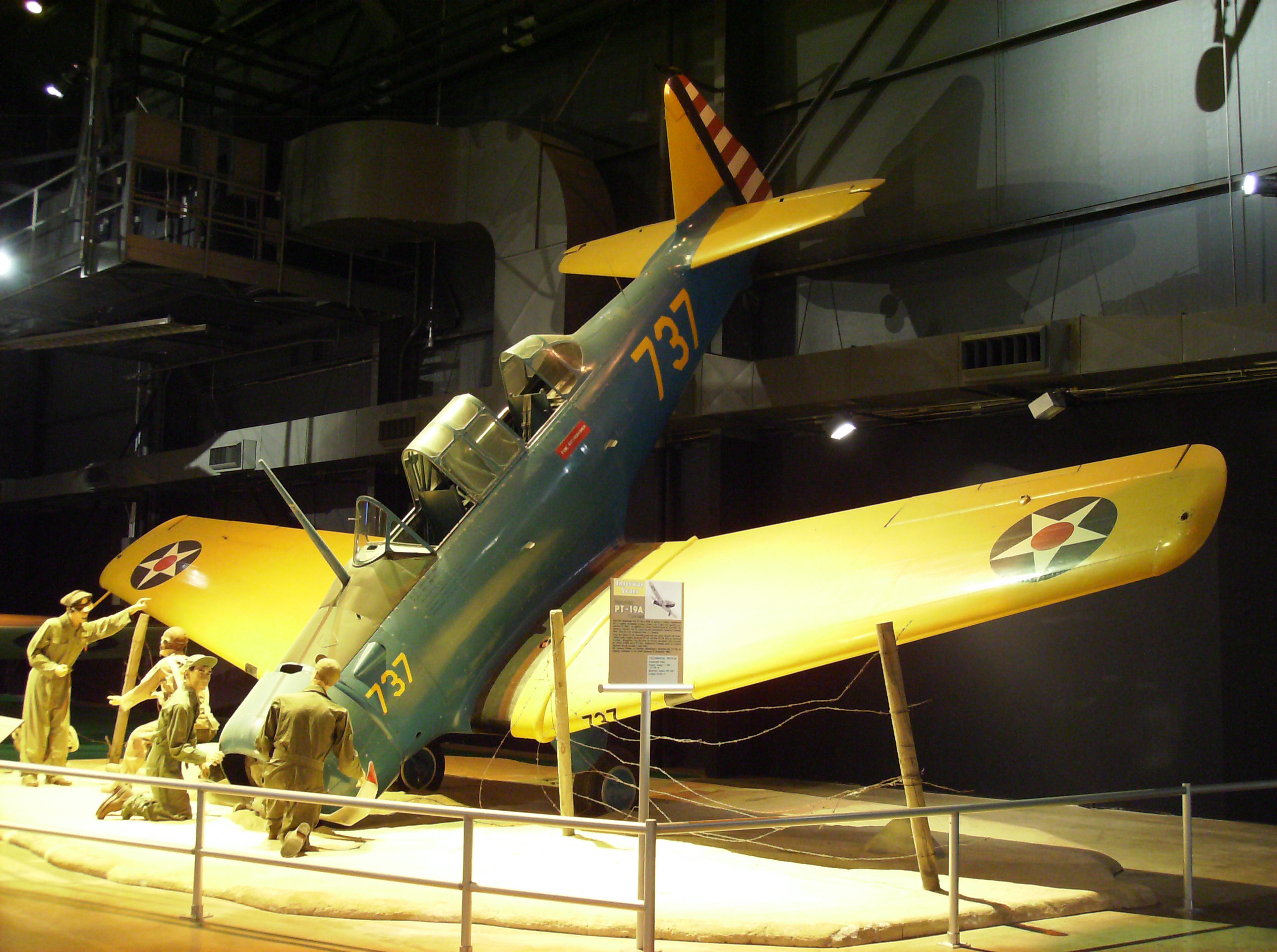
Ex-RCAF North American NA-64 Yale painted to represent a USAAC BT-14, in a diorama at the USAF Museum in Dayton, Ohio

There are many surviving NA-64 Yales today because of Ernie Simmons, a farmer from near Tillsonburg, Ontario. Simmons bought 39 Yales in 1946, along with seven Fairey Swordfish and a Westland Lysander and kept them on his farm until he died in 1970. Most were auctioned the same year, and many have been restored by museums and warbird enthusiasts. Most surviving Yales are from the Simmons collection, but there are at least six surviving Yales that came from Western Canada. Three Yales have been subsequently lost, a major hangar fire took the Musée de l'air et de l'espace's NA-64 3415/64-2224, and 3454/64-2165 & 3395/64-2159 were destroyed as the result of flying accidents. Several Yales have been painted or partially modified as BT-14s. Additionally, over a dozen are privately owned in Canada, the US, and Europe or are not accessible, and additional airframes may be held by some museums as a source of spares.

RCAF Serial	NAA Serial	Museum or organization	Location	Status	Notes
3464	64-2033	Privately owned	Ft Worth, TX	airworthy	
3349	64-2171	Imperial War Museum Duxford	Duxford, England	airworthy	
3350	64-2206	Canadian Warplane Heritage Museum	Hamilton, Ontario	airworthy	
3361	64-2183	Milestones of Flight Museum	Lancaster, California	airworthy – R-985 fitted	
3367	64-2175	Privately owned	Sherwood Park, Alberta	airworthy	
3372	64-2186	Privately owned	Tillsonburg, Ontario	airworthy	
3381	64-2194	Commemorative Air Force	Midland, Texas	stored	
3383	64-3037	Far North Queensland Aviation Museum	Newcastle, New South Wales	stored	
3390	64-3033	Privately Owned	Woodstock, Ontario	restoration	
3396	64-2161	Musée aéronautique de Presqu'île côte d'Amour	La Baule-Escoublac, France	restoration	
3397	64-2150	Pima Air & Space Museum	Tucson, Arizona	on display	
3399	64-2160	Canadian Harvard Aircraft Association	Tillsonburg, Ontario	airworthy	
3400	64-2149	Canadian Warplane Heritage Museum	Hamilton, Ontario	airworthy	
3404	64-2157	Bomber Command Museum of Canada	Nanton, Alberta	restoration	
3406	64-2144	Eric Downing	Maryland Heights, Missouri	airworthy	
3409	64-2158	Canadian Aviation Museum	Windsor, Ontario	stored, unrestored	
3411	64-2167	National Air Force Museum of Canada	Trenton, Ontario	on display	
3416	64-2169	No. 6 RCAF Dunville Museum	Dunnville, Ontario	on display	
3417	64-2168	National Museum of the United States Air Force	Dayton, Ohio	on display as 'BT-14'	
3430	64-2223	Royal Aviation Museum of Western Canada	Winnipeg, Manitoba	on display	
3445	Unknown	Privately owned	Norwood, Ontario	restored	
3450	64-2214	Musée aéronautique de Presqu'île côte d'Amour	La Baule-Escoublac, France	restoration	
3456	64-2221	Privately owned	Whistler, British Columbia	airworthy	
3458	64-3024	Reynolds-Alberta Museum	Wetaskiwin, Alberta	stored	
3462	64-2190	Commonwealth Air Training Plan Museum	Brandon, Manitoba	stored, unrestored	
3463	64-2207	Privately Owned	Casa Grande, Arizona	airworthy – R-985 fitted	

== Specifications ==
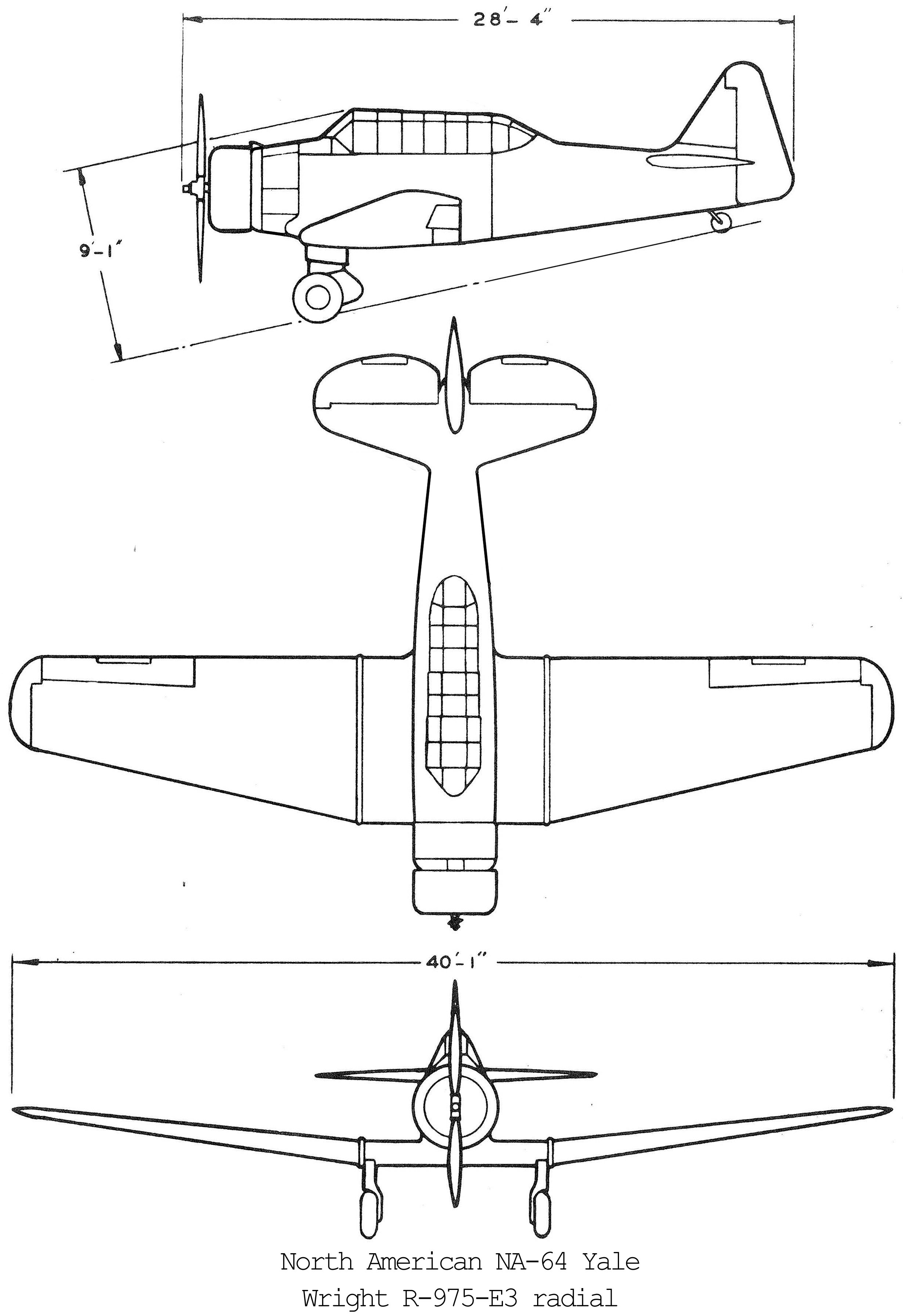
3 view line drawing of North American NA-64 Yale trainer

Data from North American Aviation, Manuel de Pilotage de l'Avion NA-64 P-2 (Avion de Perfectionnement), 1940, pp.8–9

General characteristics

- Crew: two (instructor and student)
- Length: 28 ft 4 in (8.64 m)
- Wingspan: 40 ft 1.4 in (12.228 m)
- Height: 8 ft 10.5 in (2.70 m)
- Wing area: 241.67 sq ft (22.42 m^{2})
- Empty weight: 3,324 lb (1,057 kg)
- Gross weight: 4,500 lb (2,040 kg)
- Max takeoff weight: 4,291 lb (1,946 kg) normal weight per NAA
- Fuel capacity: 104 gallons/394L including 16.5 US gallon/2.45L reserve tank
- Oil capacity 9.5 US gallon/36L
- Powerplant: 1 × Wright R-975-E3 Whirlwind radial engine, 420 hp (310 kW)
- Propellers: 2-bladed Hamilton Standard 2D30 hub & 6101A-12 blades, 9 ft 0 in (2.74 m) diameter

Performance

- Maximum speed: 166 mph (267 km/h, 144 kn) sea level
- Cruise speed: 146 mph (235 km/h, 127 kn) 64% power
- Never exceed speed: 300 mph (483 km/h, 261 kn)
- Range: 730 mi (1,175 km, 630 nmi) cruising speed
- Combat range: 475 mi (765 km, 413 nmi) maximum speed
- Endurance: 5 hrs at cruising speed, 2 hours 48 minutes at maximum speed
- Service ceiling: 17,500 ft (5,350 m) full load
- Rate of climb: 1,120 ft/min (5.7 m/s)
- Time to altitude: 11.36 min to 10,000 ft (3320 m)
- Wing loading: 17.76 lb/sq ft (86.7 kg/m^{2})
- Power/mass: 10.22lbs/hp

Armament

- light bombs (French and German examples only)

== See also ==
- 1940 in aviation

Related development

- North American NA-16 – initial design, with fabric covered fuselage
- North American BT-14 – similar aside from outer wing panels and Pratt & Whitney R-985 engine.
- North American T-6 Texan – ultimate development of design

Aircraft of comparable role, configuration, and era

- Arado Ar 96
- Curtiss-Wright CW-19R
- Fleet Fort
- Kyushu K10W1
- Vultee BT-13 Valiant

Related lists

- North American T-6 Texan variants
- List of aircraft of Canada's air forces
- List of aircraft of the French Air Force during World War II
- List of military aircraft of the German Third Reich
