= Canadian Harvard Aircraft Association =

Flying aviation museum

- Active: 1985
- Country: Canada
- Type: flying aviation museum and display team
- Garrison/HQ: Tillsonburg Airport
- Website: www.harvards.com

Aircraft flown
- Trainer: North American Harvard North American NA-64 Yale

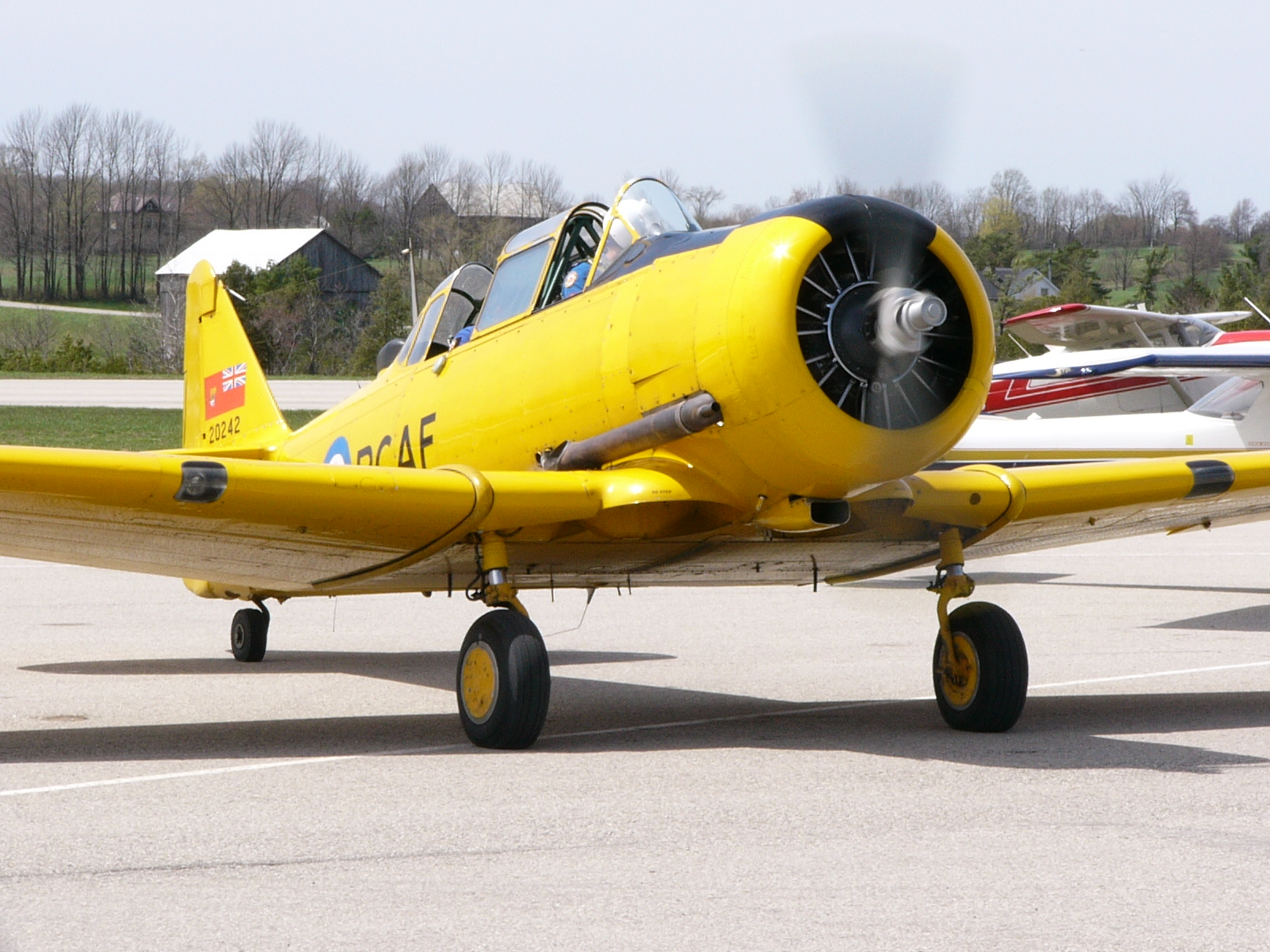
A Canadian Car & Foundry Harvard Mark 4 belonging to the Canadian Harvard Aircraft Association

The Canadian Harvard Aircraft Association (CHAA) is an all-volunteer non-profit charitable organization based in Tillsonburg, Ontario. It was founded with the aim of acquiring, preserving, restoring, maintaining, displaying and demonstrating the North American Harvard aircraft and other training aircraft associated with the Royal Canadian Air Force.

== History ==
The association was founded in 1985 at a small grass airstrip in Woodstock, Ontario, by a group of Harvard enthusiasts determined to preserve the aircraft type. CHAA moved to Tillsonburg in the late eighties.

Today, there are fewer than 50 Harvards flying in Canada, and most of them are associated with CHAA.

== Aircraft ==
CHAA currently has ten aircraft.

Summary of aircraft owned by CHAA
Type	Serial	Registration	Condition
Harvard Mk II	AJ583	C-FHWX	airworthy
Harvard Mk II	3830	C-FRWN	airworthy
Harvard Mk II	3191	C-FMTX	under restoration
Harvard Mk II	2885	none	under restoration for use as a ground trainer
Harvard Mk 4	20242	C-FWPK	airworthy
Harvard Mk 4	20304	C-FBZT	under restoration
Harvard Mk 4	20321	CF-UFZ	'Bessy' - currently offline for repainting
Harvard Mk 4	20422	C-FRZW	airworthy
Harvard Mk 4	20436	C-FWLH	static display
North American Yale	3399	C-GLJH	currently offline
