= Maracle =

Maracle is a surname. Notable people with the surname include:

- Cheri Maracle (born 1972), Canadian actress
- Clifford Maracle (1944–1996), Canadian artist
- Henry Maracle (1904–1958), Canadian ice hockey player
- Lee Maracle (1950–2021), Canadian First Nations poet and author
- Norm Maracle (born 1974), Canadian ice hockey player
