= CYTB =

CYTB may refer to:

- MT-CYB, a gene
- the ICAO code for Tillsonburg Airport in Ontario, Canada
