= CHPD-FM =

Mennonite community radio station in Aylmer, Ontario

Coordinates: 42°45′40″N 80°56′02″W

- Aylmer, Ontario; Canada
- Broadcast area: Elgin County
- Frequency: 105.9 MHz
- Branding: De Brigj

Programming
- Language: Plautdietsch
- Format: News, Weather, Ethnic and Cultural Music

Ownership
- Owner: Aylmer & Area Inter-Mennonite Community

History
- First air date: September 2, 2003
- Former frequencies: 107.7 MHz (2003–2005)
- Call sign meaning: Canada Horcht Plautdietsch

Technical information
- Class: A1
- ERP: 250 watts Vertical Polarization Only
- HAAT: 41.8 metres (137 ft)

Links
- Website: mcson.org/programs/de-brigj

CHPD-FM (also called De Brigj) is a low-power Mennonite community radio station broadcasting at 105.9 FM in Aylmer, Ontario, Canada. The Aylmer and area Inter-Mennonite Community Council, was given approval in 2003, to operate a low-power German language FM radio station at 107.7 MHz to serve the local German-speaking Mennonite community. The station includes news, weather, ethnic and cultural music, and health care information programming. In 2005, CHPD moved to its current frequency at 105.9 FM.

The callsign meaning of CHPD is "Canada Horcht Plaut Dietsch". Plautdietsch (Mennonite Low German) is the language of the Russian Mennonites. According to manager Hein Rempel, CHPD-FM is Canada's first and only Low German-language radio station. Hein was born in Mexico and moved to Canada in 1965.
