= Ontario Police College =

Police academy in Ontario, Canada

Coordinates: 42°48′11″N 80°57′09″W

^{Ontario Police College}
- Type: Police academy
- Established: 1962
- Administrative staff: 165 - 45 permanent instructors
- Location: Malahide Township, Elgin County in Southwestern Ontario., Ontario, Canada
- Campus: Urban
- Website: Ontario Police College (OPC)

The Ontario Police College (OPC) is a police academy located in Malahide Township, just east of Aylmer, in Elgin County in Southwestern Ontario, Canada.

== History ==
The Ontario Association of Chiefs of Police (OACP) proposed the idea of a central provincial police academy in the early 1950s.

The Attorney General appointed an advisory committee on police training in 1959. The college was established in 1962 and offered its first classes beginning January 7, 1963. The college is built on the grounds of the former Royal Canadian Air Force Station Aylmer, which was constructed as part of the British Commonwealth Air Training Plan during World War II. The college moved to its present facilities in 1976. The Ministry of the Solicitor General became responsible for the operations of the OPC in 1972.

In May 1984, a War memorial wind tee was dedicated to the personnel who served at Royal Canadian Air Force Station Aylmer; many of the graduates of the aircrew and ground support personnel training programs between 1941 and 1961 died in armed military service during the Second World War and the Korean War.

The Ministry of the Solicitor General is currently responsible for the operations of the OPC.

== Programs ==
With very rare exceptions, all police officers in Ontario attend the OPC for their 13-week initial program in order to receive their Basic Constable diploma. Once they have received the Diploma and after they have been sworn in as peace officers, they can then work in Ontario as police officers. The College also offers advanced courses to experienced officers in many areas, such as forensics, fraud, motorcycle riding, and certifying police as instructors for in service training.

== See also ==
- Charles O. Bick College
