= Aylmer, Ontario =

Town in Ontario, Canada

Aylmer
- Town (lower-tier)
- Town of Aylmer
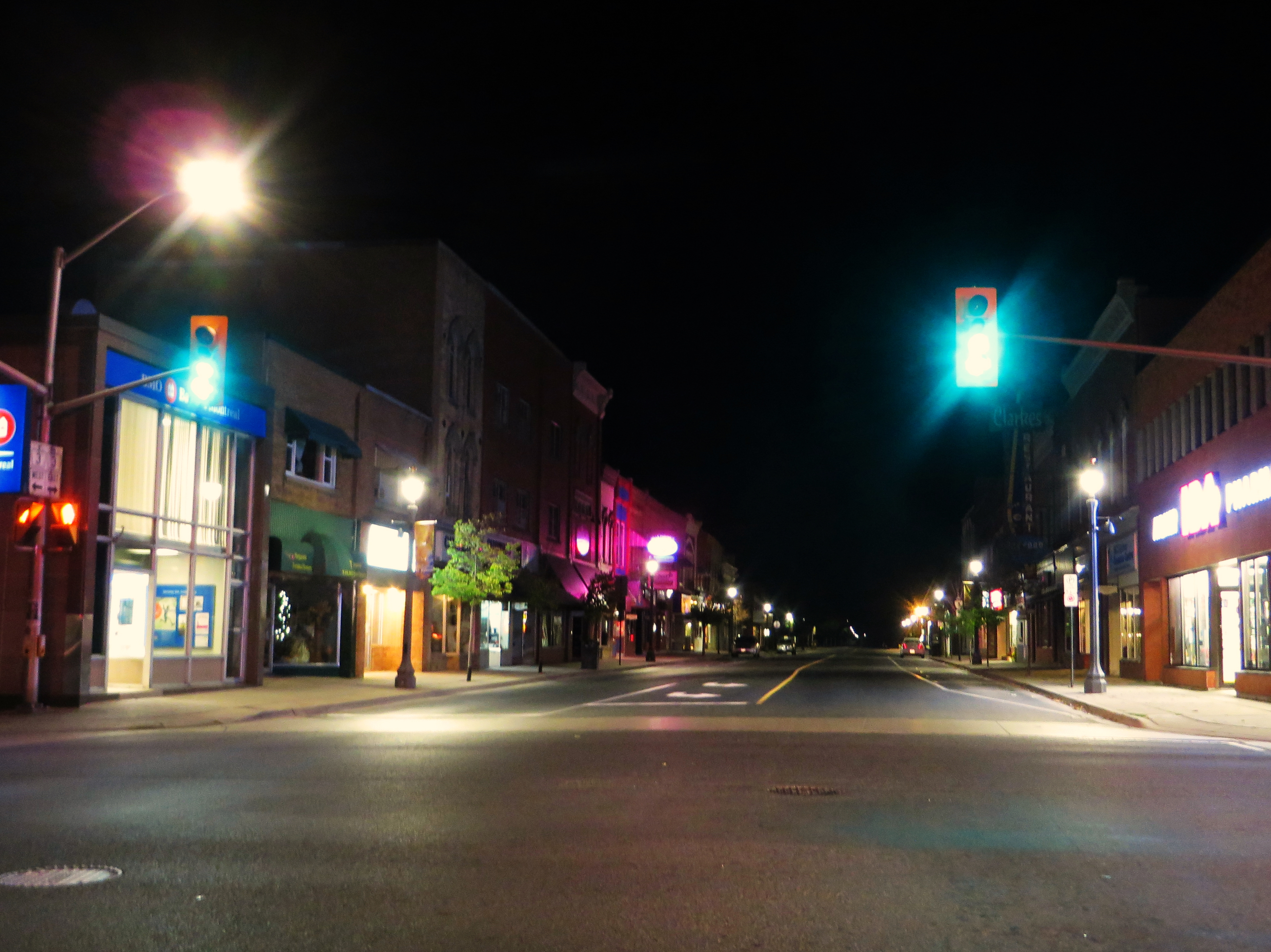
- Motto: Proud heritage, bright future.
- Location in Elgin County Aylmer (Southern Ontario)
- Coordinates: 42°46′N 80°59′W
- Country: Canada
- Province: Ontario
- County: Elgin

Government
  - Mayor: Jack Couckuyt
  - Deputy Mayor: Pete Barbour
  - Federal riding: Elgin—St. Thomas—London South
  - Prov. riding: Elgin—Middlesex—London

Area
  - Land: 6.26 km^{2} (2.42 sq mi)
  - Urban: 6.23 km^{2} (2.41 sq mi)
- Elevation: 235.90 m (774.0 ft)

Population (2016)
  - Town (lower-tier): 7,492
  - Density: 1,197.6/km^{2} (3,102/sq mi)
- Time zone: UTC-5 (EST)
  - Summer (DST): UTC-4 (EDT)
- Forward sortation area: N5H
- Area codes: 519 and 226
- Highways: Highway 3 Former Highway 73
- Website: aylmer.ca

Aylmer is a town in Elgin County in southern Ontario, Canada, just north of Lake Erie, on Catfish Creek. It is 20 kilometres (12 mi) south of Highway 401, and is almost equidistant between the United States cities of Detroit and Buffalo.

Aylmer is surrounded by Malahide Township.

== History ==
In October 1817, John Van Patter, an immigrant from New York State, obtained 200 acres (80 hectares) of land and became the first settler on the site of Aylmer. During the 1830s a general store was opened and village lots sold. Originally called Troy, in 1835 it was renamed Aylmer after Lord Aylmer, then Governor-in-Chief of British North America. By 1851 local enterprises included sawmills and flour-mills powered by water from Catfish Creek. Aided by easy access to Lake Erie, Aylmer became by the mid-1860s the marketing centre for a rich agricultural and timber producing area. Benefiting greatly from the construction of the 230 km (150 mile) Canada Air Line Railway from Glencoe to Fort Erie, Aylmer became an incorporated village in 1872 and a town in 1887.

A Royal Canadian Air Force Training Facility, RCAF Station Aylmer was located just north of Aylmer in Malahide Township from 1941 to 1961. This station is now home to the Ontario Police College and The Aylmer Wildlife Management Area.

Former mayor Robert Habkirk (1994–2003) was again elected the mayor of Aylmer on November 13, 2006, to a four-year term. He was defeated by the former principal of East Elgin Secondary School, Jack Couckuyt, by a wide margin on October 25, 2010.

In 2004, a new arena, the East Elgin Community Complex, was completed to house the many hockey leagues in town. The Old Town Hall which houses the library, also has a restored theatre which houses occasional plays. For history buffs, the Aylmer Museum houses a collection of 19th century Victorian art pieces created from hair.

In 2007, Communities in Bloom, a nationwide beautification program, awarded Aylmer first place in Canada in the 5001 to 10,000 population category.

The community drew attention during the 2020 COVID-19 pandemic when a local church held drive-in worship services where parishioners remained in their vehicles. The services were considered by Aylmer Police to be in possible violation of provincial restrictions on public gatherings but they opted not to levy fines of up to 100,000 CAD. In November that year, Aylmer was the site of a 2000-person demonstration against COVID-19 related restrictions.

== Mennonite and Amish communities ==
In the mid-1970s, many Plautdietsch-speaking Mennonites began migrating to the Aylmer area from Mexico. The Mennonites were Canadian citizens who had moved to Mexico from Manitoba and Saskatchewan during the first half of the 20th century. By the early 21st century, there was a large Mennonite population in Aylmer and the surrounding area. In addition to the Mennonite population there are sizable Dutch, German, and British descended populations in the area.

Just east of Aylmer is a sizable Old Order Amish community. This community was founded by families moving from Ohio in 1953. They were uncomfortable with a nuclear facility being constructed close to their community in Ohio. Since that time, the community has grown to encompass three "districts" in the surrounding area. A number of members from this community participate in the weekly Aylmer Sales Barn and sell fruit, vegetables, eggs, and animals, such as rabbits and chickens. This particular Amish community eschews the use of automobiles, electricity, and most modern conveniences. An Amish publishing house, Pathway Publishers, is based in the community.

== Tobacco industry ==
The tobacco-growing industry played a large part in the economic development of Aylmer. Imperial Tobacco Canada built a plant in Aylmer in the mid-1940s. At its peak, Imperial employed more than 800 full-time and seasonal workers. After declining tobacco sales in Canada, Imperial began downsizing in the 1990s. In October 2005, Imperial Tobacco announced that the Aylmer and Guelph, Ontario, plants would close. The plant closed permanently in July 2007, putting the remaining 75 employees out of work.

== Ontario Police College ==
In the early 1950s, the Ontario Association of Chiefs of Police (OACP) proposed the idea of a central provincial police academy. In 1959 the Attorney General appointed an advisory committee on police training in 1962 announced the formal establishment of the college. OPC offered its first classes beginning January 7, 1963, in the temporary wartime training quarters of an abandoned Royal Canadian Air Force base near Aylmer, Ontario. In 1976 the college moved to its present facilities. The College Is situated on 300 acres (121.5 hectares) of rural land five kilometers (3 miles) northeast of the town of Aylmer, Ontario (190 km; 120 miles west of Toronto). The college has 165 full and part-time employees including instructors, support and seconded staff. The 45 permanent instructors are supplemented by police officers from various police services, usually for two-year periods. With very rare exceptions, all Police Officers in Ontario, Canada attend the college for their 13-week program in order to receive their Basic Constables Training Diploma. Once they have received the Diploma and after they have been sworn in as Peace Officers, they can then work in the Province of Ontario as police officers.

== Aylmer Fair ==
The Aylmer Fair is a non-profit society run by the OAAS (Ontario Association of Agricultural Societies). They are the oldest agricultural fair in District 13. It is run by a board of Directors, and volunteers in the area. In 1846, the Aylmer and East Elgin Agricultural Society (formally known as the Malahide Agricultural Society up until 1860) began its annual exhibitions of agriculture and livestock to the people in and around the Aylmer area. In 30 years the fair grew from a few dozen exhibits in the 1850s to over 1700 in 1876. The Aylmer fair also expanded from an afternoon show to a two-day event and membership to the Society has grown to over 200 members. It was not until 1865 that ladies' exhibitions were included in the fair. Stock and wheat became uninteresting and was not likely to attract exhibitors and visitors. "Women's Work" was an essential, interesting and an attracting element in the success of the fair. In 1874, 523 entries (1/6th of the exhibits) were based largely on Women's Work. Throughout the early years the fair travelled and was held in many locations, but found its permanent location in 1875 in Aylmer, where 8 acres of land was purchased. In this year the fair held its first opening day, surrounded by a high well built board fence, charging $.10 for admission into the fair. The Aylmer Fair entered the 20th Century with unparalleled success. Businessmen supported it eagerly through donations and participation and even helped decorate the town for the fair days. It was known as "Aylmer's Greatest Fair," with a train excursion that travelled from Hamilton, London and St. Thomas with passengers wanting to see the fair. However, after issues of agricultural exhibits versus expensive attractions by business men, in 1910 the fair was cancelled. Farmers and others complained that throughout the preceding years, the extravagant attractions that were created leveled the significance that agriculture and livestock was given. It was a struggle to get the fair up and running again with many problems each year including funding issues and low admission rates until 1924. A turnover in personnel and the government granted more funding, this turning point created major changes in attractions and promotions over the next six years. During the 1940s, the war effort was a major theme of the fair. In 1941, admission costs, membership fees and 50% of the profits were given to the Red Cross and a war bond was purchased with the remaining 50%. The fair held its Centennial in 1956, celebrating its 100-year anniversary and the achievements it had developed. From 1945 to 1965 was the greatest period in the fair's history. No period prior had sustained such growth in all aspects of the fair: in buildings, attendance, and growth of exhibits and in general participation. It has continued to grow. 1977 created a new record in attendance of 47,000 people present at the two-day event. It continues to grow every year, with great attractions including agriculture, family activities and midway events. 2013 marks the 168th year at the Aylmer Fair.

== Demographics ==
Historical population
Year	Pop.	±%
1841	260	—
1871	1,400	+438.5%
1881	1,540	+10.0%
1891	2,167	+40.7%
1901	2,204	+1.7%
1911	2,102	−4.6%
1921	2,194	+4.4%
1931	2,283	+4.1%
1941	2,478	+8.5%
1951	3,483	+40.6%
1961	4,705	+35.1%
1971	4,755	+1.1%
1981	5,254	+10.5%
1991	6,244	+18.8%
1996	7,018	+12.4%
2001	7,126	+1.5%
2006	7,069	−0.8%
2011	7,151	+1.2%
2016	7,492	+4.8%
1996 population would have been 7,022 with boundaries of 2001; 2001 population would have been 7158 with boundaries of 2006

In the 2021 Census of Population conducted by Statistics Canada, Aylmer had a population of 7,699 living in 3,067 of its 3,177 total private dwellings, a change of 2.8% from its 2016 population of 7,492. With a land area of 6.37 km^{2} (2.46 sq mi), it had a population density of 1,208.6/km^{2} (3,130.3/sq mi) in 2021.

Canada census – Aylmer community profile

	2021	2016	2011
Population	7,699 (+2.8% from 2016)	7,492 (+4.8% from 2011)	7,151 (+1.2% from 2006)
Land area	6.37 km^{2} (2.46 sq mi)	6.26 km^{2} (2.42 sq mi)	6.22 km^{2} (2.40 sq mi)
Population density	1,208.6/km^{2} (3,130/sq mi)	1,197.6/km^{2} (3,102/sq mi)	1,148.9/km^{2} (2,976/sq mi)
Median age	39.2 (M: 36.4, F: 41.6)	39.3 (M: 37.0, F: 41.3)	39.5 (M: 37.1, F: 41.5)
Private dwellings	3,177 (total) 3,067 (occupied)	3,031 (total)	2,917 (total)
Median household income	$73,500	$56,806

References: 2021 2016 2011

== Climate ==
Climate data for Aylmer
Month	Jan	Feb	Mar	Apr	May	Jun	Jul	Aug	Sep	Oct	Nov	Dec	Year
Average precipitation mm (inches)	86.1 (3.39)	65.9 (2.59)	72.9 (2.87)	81.9 (3.22)	80.1 (3.15)	86.4 (3.40)	81.4 (3.20)	86.9 (3.42)	89.2 (3.51)	83.2 (3.28)	95.1 (3.74)	80 (3.1)	988.8 (38.93)
Average rainfall mm (inches)	49 (1.9)	38.2 (1.50)	53.9 (2.12)	78.2 (3.08)	80.1 (3.15)	86.4 (3.40)	81.4 (3.20)	86.9 (3.42)	89.2 (3.51)	82.9 (3.26)	87.6 (3.45)	59.2 (2.33)	872.9 (34.37)
Average snowfall cm (inches)	37 (15)	27.7 (10.9)	19 (7.5)	3.7 (1.5)	0 (0)	0 (0)	0 (0)	0 (0)	0 (0)	0.3 (0.1)	7.4 (2.9)	21.2 (8.3)	116.3 (45.8)

== Media ==
Aylmer has two local radio stations: CHPD-FM on 105.9 FM (a Low German radio station), and low-power religious station VF8016 at 90.1 FM.

== Sports ==
=== Current franchises ===
Active sports teams in Aylmer
Club	League	Sport	Venue	Established	Championships
Aylmer Spitfires	PJHL	Ice hockey	East Elgin Community Complex	1974	0

=== Former franchises ===
Former sports teams in Aylmer
Club	League	Sport	Venue	Established	Moved/Folded	Championships
Aylmer Aces	WJBHL	Ice hockey	East Elgin Memorial Community Centre	1991	2002	0
Aylmer Blues	OHASr	Ice hockey	East Elgin Memorial Community Centre	2003	2005	0
Aylmer Hornets	OHASr	Ice hockey	East Elgin Memorial Community Centre	1987	2000	0

== Notable people ==
- Joseph Flintoft Berry, Methodist bishop
- Herbert James Davis, politician
- Martin Fabi, football player
- Randy Fabi, football player
- Henry Hildebrandt, pastor, COVID-19 denialist, and anti-vaccine activist
- Karl Keffer, golfer
- Michael Lysko, former commissioner of the Canadian Football League
- Clifford Maracle, artist
- Charles Vance Millar, lawyer
- Elmo Stoll, Amish bishop
- David Thompson, musician
- Jack Valiquette, hockey player
- Craig Van Ymeren, curler
- Harold Albert White, flying ace
- Adolphus Williams, politician

== See also ==
- List of municipalities in Ontario
