= North American BT-9 =

United States Army Air Corps trainer aircraft

BT-9/BT-14/NJ
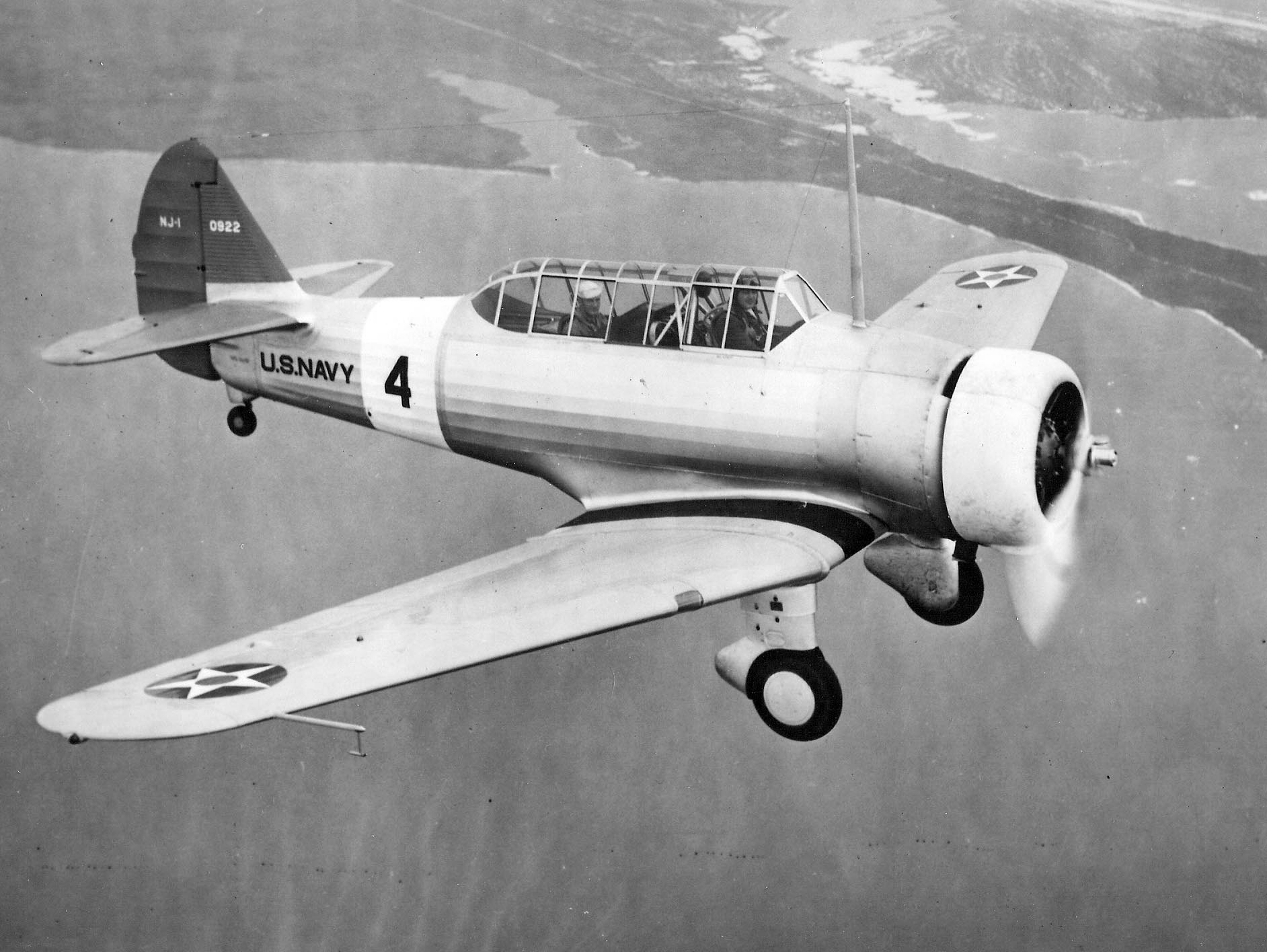
- A U.S. Navy NJ-1 in flight, 1938

General information
- Type: Trainer
- Manufacturer: North American Aviation
- Primary users: United States Army Air Corps United States Navy
- Number built: +260

History
- First flight: April 1936
- Developed from: North American NA-16
- Developed into: North American BC-1; North American NA-64 Yale

The North American BT-9 was the United States Army Air Corps (USAAC) designation for a low-wing single engine monoplane primary trainer aircraft that served before and during World War II.

It was a contemporary of the Boeing-Stearman PT-13 Kaydet biplane trainer which pilots learned to fly on before advancing to Basic Flying Training on the BT-9. If they passed, they would continue on to the North American BC-1 and later the AT-6 and other aircraft types specific for each role. During the war, it was discovered that increasing the number of hours of Primary Flying Training eliminated the need for intermediate trainers like the BT-9 and so production never reached the levels for the PT and AT types. The NJ-1 was used by the United States Navy for a similar role, but was closer to the one off BT-10.

== Design and development ==
The BT-9, designated NA-19 by the manufacturer, evolved from the North American NA-16, which first flew in April 1935. The BT-9 design first flew in April 1936.

The wing and tail control surfaces were fabric-covered, as well as the sides of the fuselage from just behind the firewall to the tail. The remainder of the aircraft was metal-covered and featured fixed (non-retractable) landing gear. The Army Air Corps purchased a total of 199 BT-9s, BT-9As and BT-9Bs. Many foreign countries also used variants of this aircraft under North American's NA-16 designation.

The first BT-9C s/n 37-383 was built with a 600 hp Pratt & Whitney R-1340-41, but was otherwise similar to the normal BT-9Cs. It was delivered as the Y1BT-10, and later redesignated BT-10.

The BT-9D was a one off prototype that tested out a number of ideas that went into production as the BT-14 (NA-58), which the similar North American NA-64 Yale represented a major aerodynamic improvement over the NA-16 series, with a longer all-metal fuselage replacing the fabric covered fuselage of the earlier NA-16s. The BT-14 featured a Pratt & Whitney R-985 engine versus the Wright R-975 used on the BT-9. As well as metal skin replacing the fabric on the fuselage, the fin was moved aft slightly, lengthening the rear fuselage while the engine was moved forward to maintain the center of gravity. The rudder was also changed from the rounded shape used previously to one with a roughly triangular shape, with the broadest part being at the bottom, and the canopy was redesigned. The new fuselage would provide the basis for the entire AT-6 family, when fitted with the larger Pratt & Whitney R-1340 engine, a new wing with retractable undercarriage and minor changes for a gunners position.

The BT-9 suffered from stall/spin problems and a variety of fixes were tried. The USAAC temporarily settled on using slats on the later versions of the BT-9. However these did not work well, and the BT-14s longer fuselage and swept forward outer wing panels, unlike the straight trailing edges of the BT-9 helped somewhat.

== Operational history ==
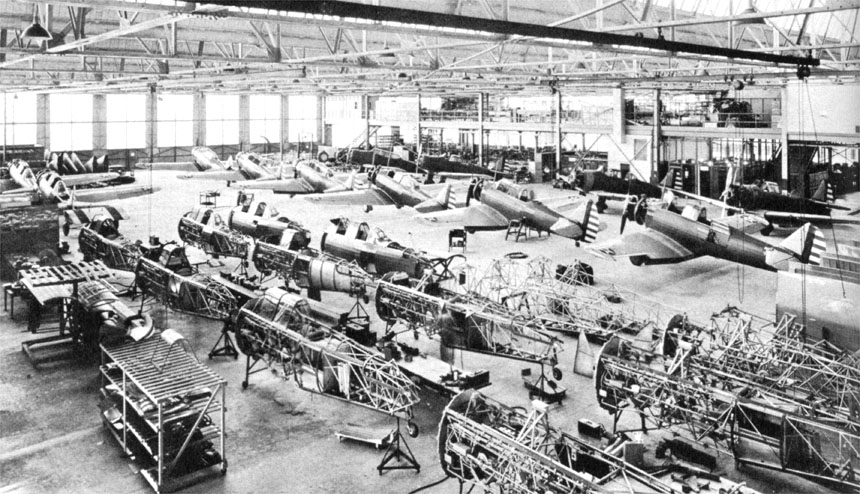
BT-9 production in 1936.

The NA-26, an improved model with retractable landing gear which became the prototype for AT-6 Texan advanced trainer, was developed from the NA-16 design.

== Variants ==
Source: Warbirds
NA-16
Prototype aircraft, one built.
NA-18
Pre-production aircraft, one built.
North American BT-9
Unarmed two-seat primary trainer for the USAAC, powered by 400 hp (300 kW) Wright R-975-7 Whirlwind engine. Company designation NA-19. 42 built.

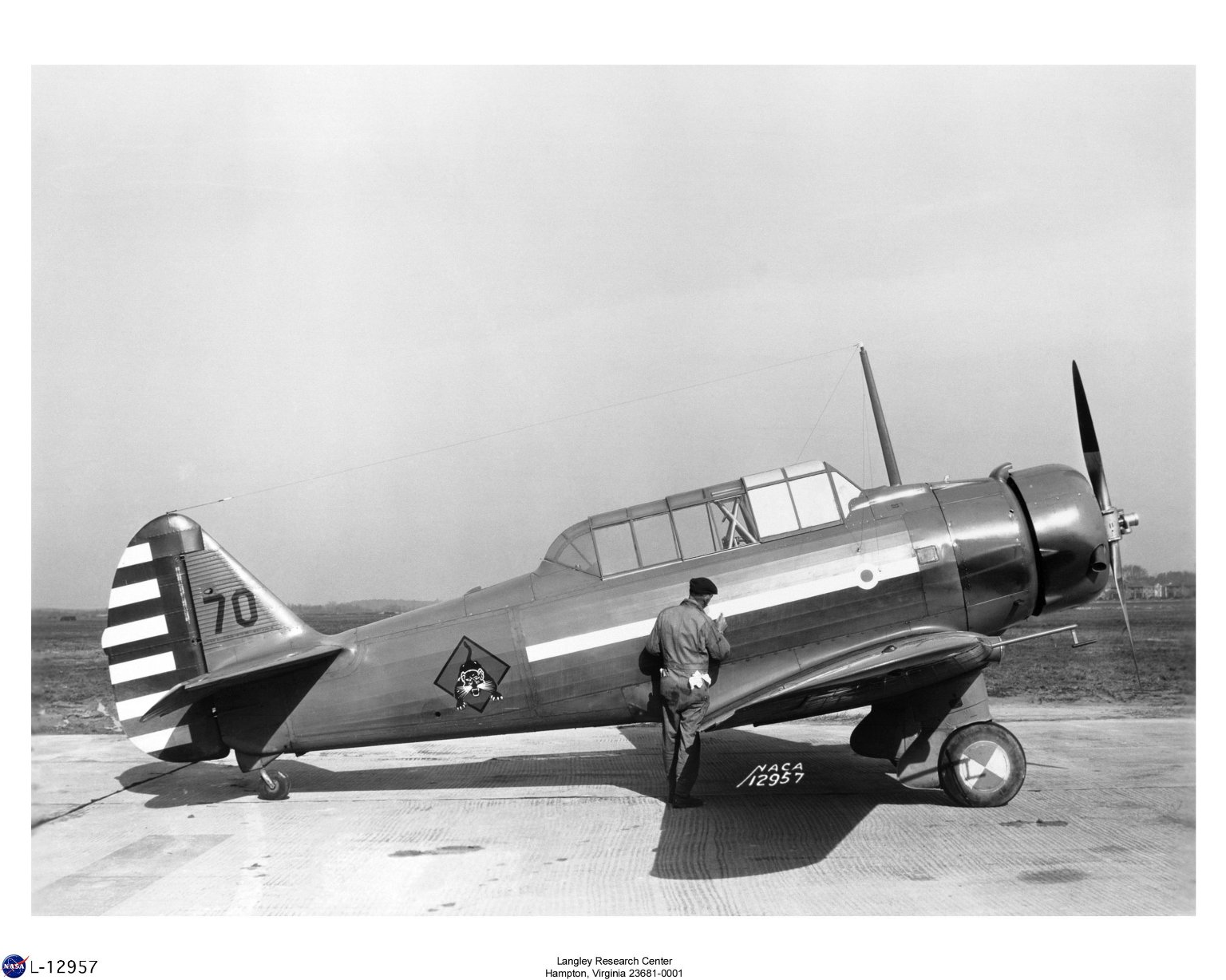
BT-9A at Langley

North American BT-9A
Armed with two 0.30 in (7.62 mm) machine guns(one fixed forward firing and 1 flexible in rear cockpit), 40 built.
North American BT-9B
Improved unarmed version, 117 built.
North American BT-9C
Similar to the BT-9B, but with some equipment changes, 97 built.
North American BT-9D
One prototype only, which led to the development of the BT-14.
North American Y1BT-10 & BT-10
One prototype from BT-9C batch re-engined with a 600 hp R-1340-41.
North American NJ-1
Two-seat primary trainer aircraft for the USN, powered by a 600 hp (447 kW) Pratt & Whitney R-1340 radial piston engine, 40 delivered.

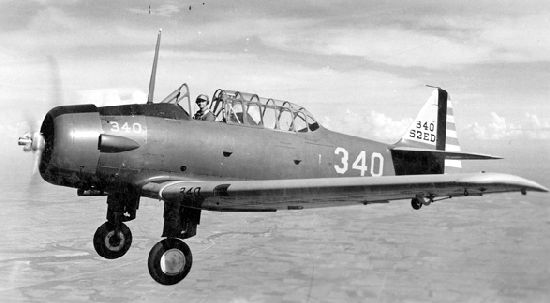
BT-14

North American YBT-14
Redesignated BT-9D as prototype for BT-14.
North American BT-14
Advanced version with lengthened metal fuselage and T-6 outer wing panels, powered by a 450 hp (336 kW) Pratt & Whitney R-985-25 radial piston engine, USAAC, 251 delivered.
North American BT-14A
27 BT-14s were converted to take the 400 hp (298 kW) Pratt & Whitney R-985-11 radial piston engine.

== Operators ==
United States

- United States Army Air Corps (until June 1941)
- United States Army Air Forces (after June 1941)
- United States Navy

== Surviving aircraft ==
BT-9

- Museo del Aire de Honduras at Toncontín - BT-9C exported to Honduras as NA-16-2A

BT-14

No original aircraft, but several Yales have been painted or partially modified as BT-14s

- Commemorative Air Force - ex RCAF Yale 3450 to be restored as a BT-14
- National Museum of the United States Air Force - ex RCAF Yale 3417 displayed as a BT-14

== Specifications (BT-9) ==
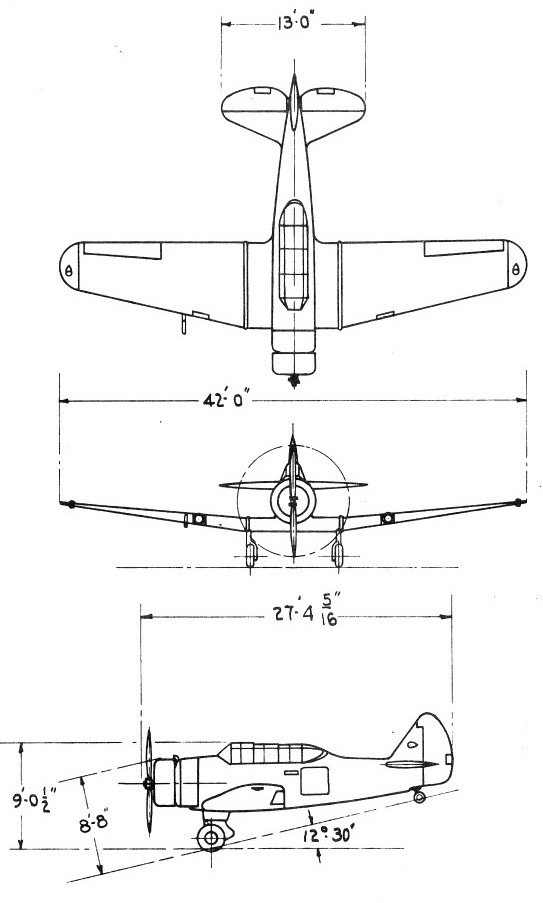
3-view line drawing of the North American BT-9

General characteristics

- Crew: two, instructor and student
- Length: 28 ft 0 in (8.5 m)
- Wingspan: 42 ft 0 in (12.8 m)
- Height: 13 ft 7 in (4.1 m)
- Gross weight: 4,470 lb (2,030 kg)
- Powerplant: 1 × Wright R-975-53 , 400 hp (300 kW)

Performance

- Maximum speed: 170 mph (273 km/h, 150 kn)
- Cruise speed: 146 mph (235 km/h, 127 kn)
- Range: 877 mi (1,411 km, 762 nmi)
- Service ceiling: 19,750 ft (6,020 m)

== See also ==
Related development

- North American NA-16
- North American NA-64 Yale
- North American T-6 Texan
- CAC Wirraway

Aircraft of comparable role, configuration, and era

- Aircraft Research BT-11
- Arado Ar 96
- Curtiss-Wright CW-19R
- Fleet Fort
- Fleetwings BT-12 Sophomore
- Kyushu K10W1
- Vultee BT-13/BT-15 Valiant

Related lists

- North American T-6 Texan variants
- List of military aircraft of the United States
- List of aircraft of the French Air Force during World War II
