= Catfish Creek (Lake Erie, Elgin) =

Creek in Ontario, Canada

Coordinates: 42.6554°N 81.0079°W

Catfish Creek is a creek in Elgin County in southwestern Ontario which empties into the north shore of Lake Erie. Catfish Creek begins in the northwest area of Aylmer and flows in a generally southern direction before flowing into Lake Erie at Port Bruce. It is a significant creek in that it flows through an area of Carolinian forest. Worthy of note is the area just northwest of Port Bruce called the Catfish Creek Slope and Floodplain Forest. "Encompassing 233 hectares, this unique Area of Natural and Scientific Interest contains some of the most endangered habitat in Canada. It lies in the heart of the Carolinian Zone of Southern Ontario and provides mature, deciduous forest cover that is able to support plant and animal life normally found much further south. All of this Carolinian Canada site is privately owned."

== Communities ==
- Aylmer, Ontario
- Port Bruce, Ontario

== Gallery ==
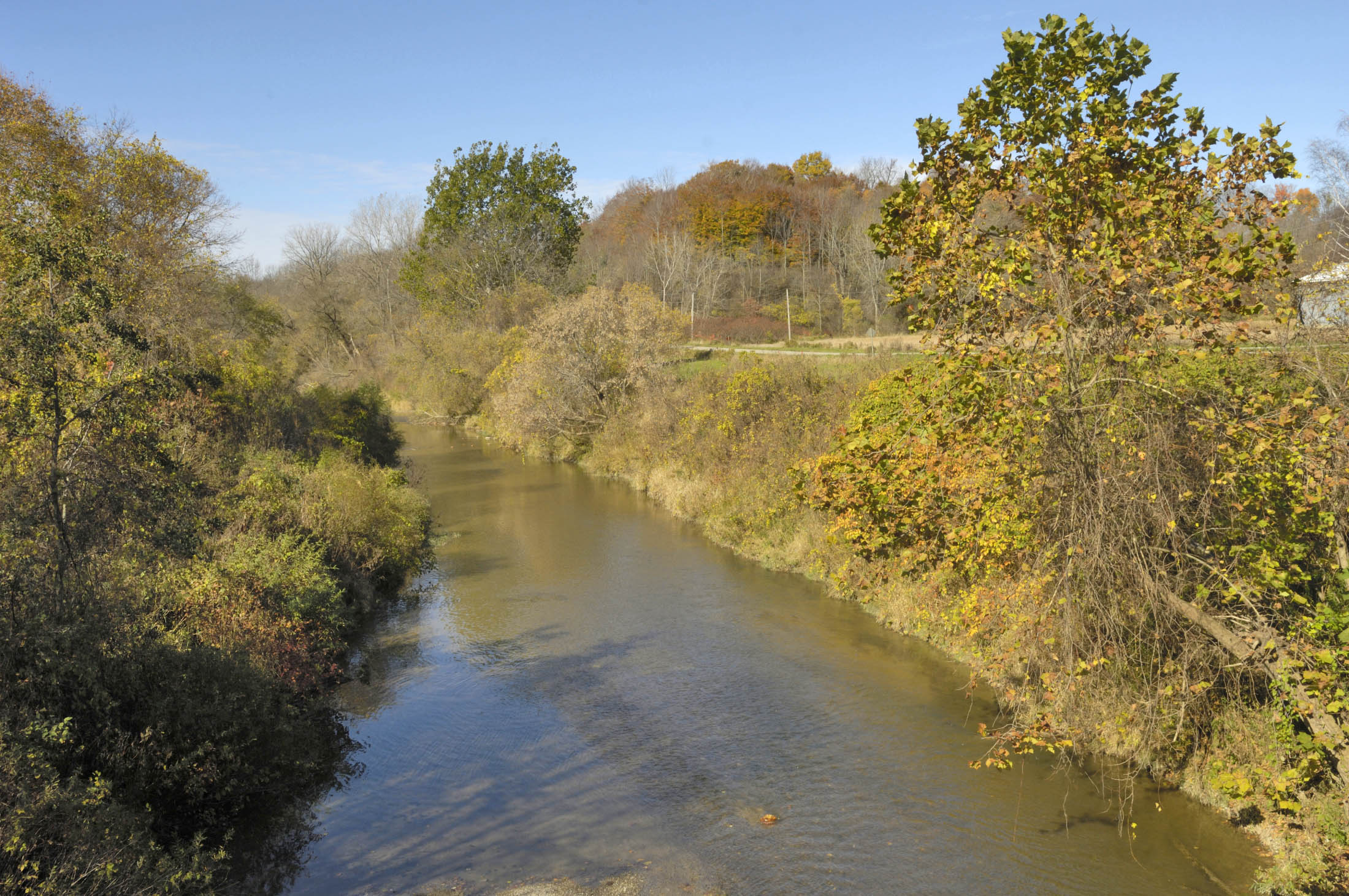

== See also ==
- List of rivers of Ontario
