= RCAF Station Aylmer =

- Malahide, Ontario; Near Aylmer, Ontario in Canada
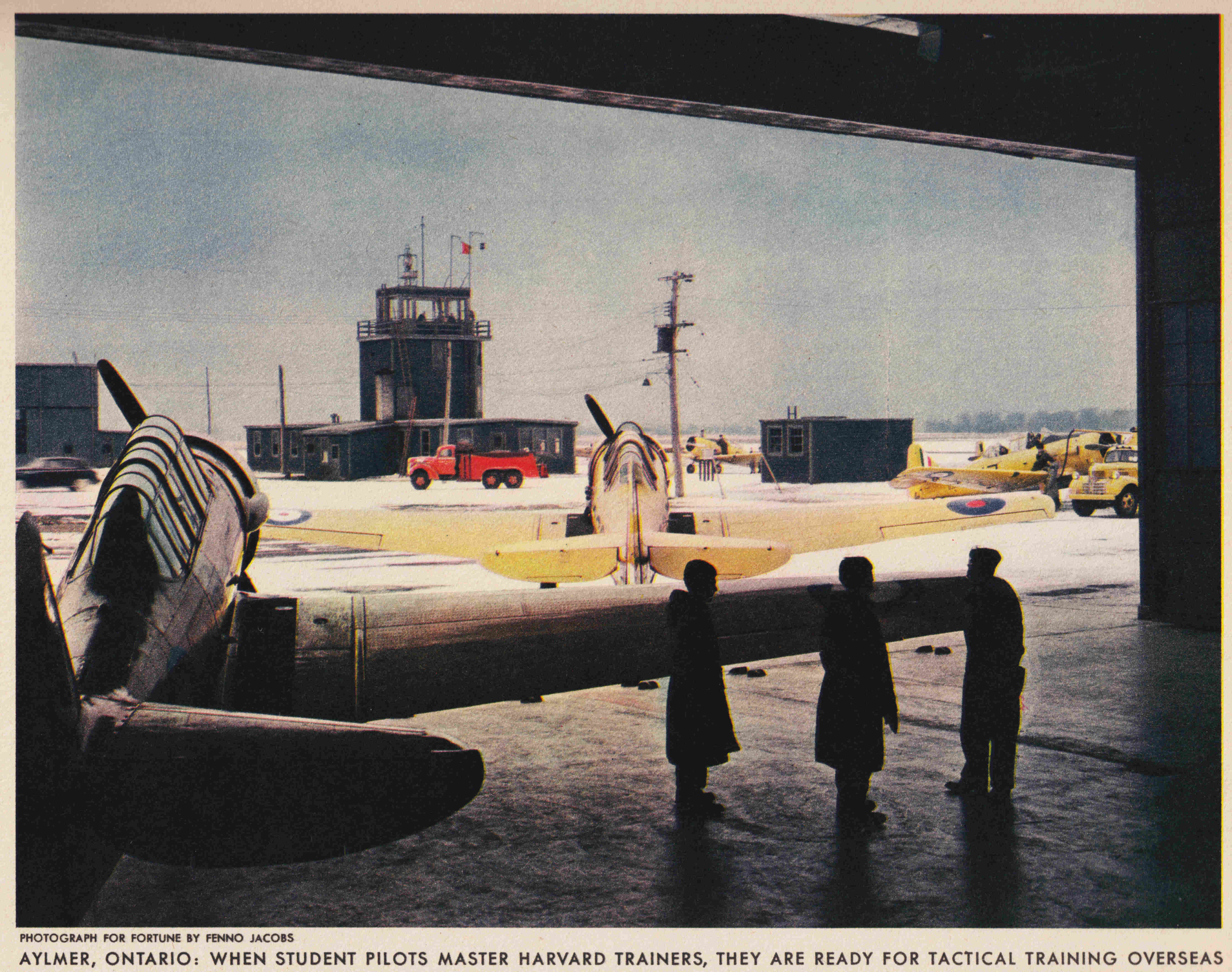
- Control Tower in 1941

Site information
- Operator: Royal Canadian Air Force
- Controlled by: No. 1 Training Command

Location

Site history
- Built: 1940-1941
- In use: 1941–1961
- Fate: Closed, now operated as the Ontario Police College

Garrison information
- Past commanders: G/C Norman Irwin - 1941; W/C Lew Ingram - 1943
- Garrison: No. 14 Service Flying Training School; No. 1 Flight Engineers School; Women's Division Service Police School

RCAF Station Aylmer
- Role: British Commonwealth Air Training Plan; Aircrew and groundcrew training
- Station Magazine: The Aylmer Airman

Aircraft flown
- Trainer: North American Harvard; North American Yale; Handley Page Halifax; Bristol Beaufort; Handley Page Hampden

RCAF Station Aylmer was a Royal Canadian Air Force airfield that was built between late 1940 and June 1941 northeast of Aylmer, Ontario. It was one of many built across Canada under the British Commonwealth Air Training Plan during World War II.

The first school at the airfield was No. 14 Service Flying Training School (SFTS). RCAF staff began arriving at the station before construction was finished. First to arrive was a 17-man security party under Sgt. Les Oliver in late March. Squadron Leader T. Moreton, the first officer, arrived on 2 June 1941 to manage the new station's equipment. Wing Commander Norman Irwin arrived at Aylmer on 18 June 1941 on "Temporary Duty" and was appointed C.O. when the station was activated on 3 July 1941.

Opening ceremonies were held on 2 August 1941 with the Lieutenant Governor of Ontario Albert Matthews and the Premier of Ontario Mitchell Hepburn on hand. The new station was open to the public that afternoon and guests were treated to an aerobatic display by the instructors.

Relief airfields were R1—Yarmouth Centre, Ontario and R2—Tillsonburg, Ontario. Pilots used North American Harvards as their advanced trainer. Some North American Yales arrived on 23 January 1942 and were mainly used for navigation exercises. No. 14 SFTS moved to Kingston in August 1944.

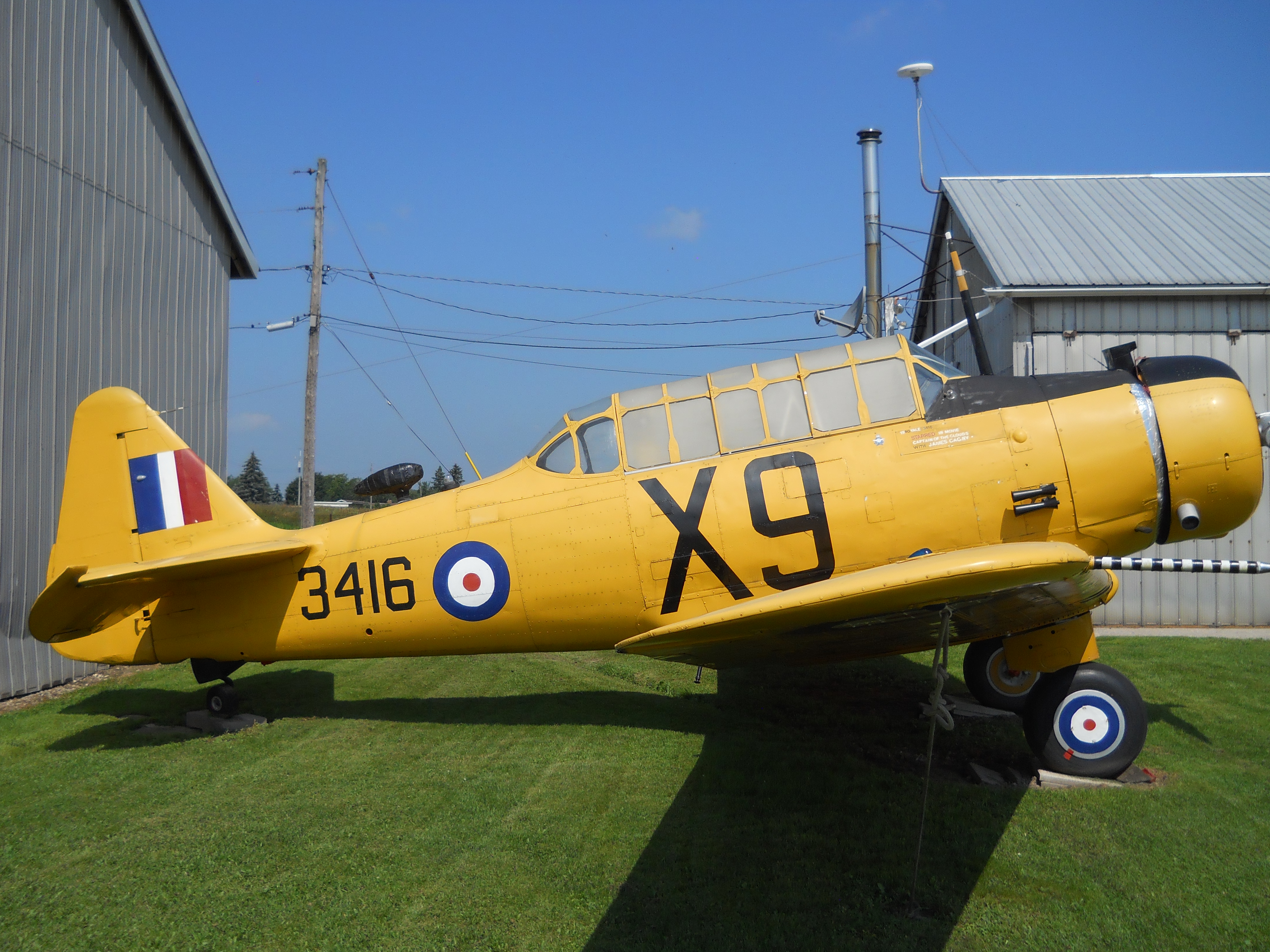
RCAF Yale (W/T) Wireless Trainer

Other schools located at Aylmer include:

- Women's Division Service Police School (1942)
- No. 1 Flight Engineers' School (1 July 1944 – 31 March 1945).

== Aerodrome information ==
The airfield was constructed in a typical BCATP wartime pattern, with six runways formed in an overlaid triangle. In approximately 1942 the aerodrome was listed at 42°49′N 80°57′W with a Var. 5 degrees W and elevation of 775 feet (236 m). Six runways were listed as follows:

Runway Name	Length	Width	Surface
4/22	2,600 feet (792 m)	100 feet (30 m)	Hard surfaced
4/22	2,600 feet (792 m)	100 feet (30 m)	Hard surfaced
9/27	2,600 feet (792 m)	100 feet (30 m)	Hard surfaced
9/27	2,600 feet (792 m)	100 feet (30 m)	Hard surfaced
15/33	2,600 feet (792 m)	100 feet (30 m)	Hard surfaced
15/33	2,600 feet (792 m)	100 feet (30 m)	Hard surfaced

== Relief landing field – Yarmouth Centre ==
The primary relief landing field (R1) for RCAF Station Aylmer was Yarmouth Centre, located east of St. Thomas. The Relief field was laid out in the standard triangular pattern. In approximately 1942 the aerodrome was listed as RCAF Aerodrome - St. Thomas, Ontario at 42°46′N 81°07′W with a Var. 5 degrees W and elevation of 760 feet (232 m). Three runways were listed as follows:

Runway Name	Length	Width	Surface
15/33	2,600 feet (792 m)	100 feet (30 m)	Hard Surfaced
9/27	2,600 feet (792 m)	100 feet (30 m)	Hard Surfaced
3/21	2,600 feet (792 m)	100 feet (30 m)	Hard Surfaced

The Yarmouth Centre airfield now operates as the St. Thomas Municipal Airport.

== Relief landing field – Tillsonburg ==
The secondary Relief Landing Field (R2) for RCAF Station Aylmer was located north-west of the community of Tillsonburg. In approximately 1942 the aerodrome was listed at 42°55′30″N 80°45′00″W as a "Turf - All-way field - Under Construction" no elevation, variation, or runway specifications were listed.

== Postwar ==
RCAF Aylmer continued operations after the war's end and was home to a variety of training facilities:

- Technical and Engineering School (later redesignated No. 1 Technical Training School or TTS) (April 1945 – May 1955)
- Academic Training School (ATS) (May 1949 – October 1950)
- No. 2 Composite Training School (No. 2 KTS)
- No. 11 Examination Unit (September 1951 – November 1952)
- Aeronautical Engineering School (June 1952 – November 1953)
- GCA (Ground Control Approach) School (1953 – 1957)
- Fire-Fighting School (1951 – 1961)
- Support Services School (1960)

No. 2 Manning Depot and No. 1 Personnel Selection Unit (PSU) were located at Aylmer from 1949 – 1950.

The station closed in 1961 and the Ontario Police College eventually took over the facilities. All that remains from the RCAF days are 2 hangars, the deteriorating airfield and the taxi area, which is now used as part of the police vehicle driver training track. Outline of one of the former runways exists in what is now Alymer Wildlife Area. A memorial to the former RCAF station sits at the entrance to the Ontario Police College property.

== Remembrance ==
Twelve flying instructors and 26 students lost their lives training at No. 14 SFTS.

== RCAF Aylmer scenes ==
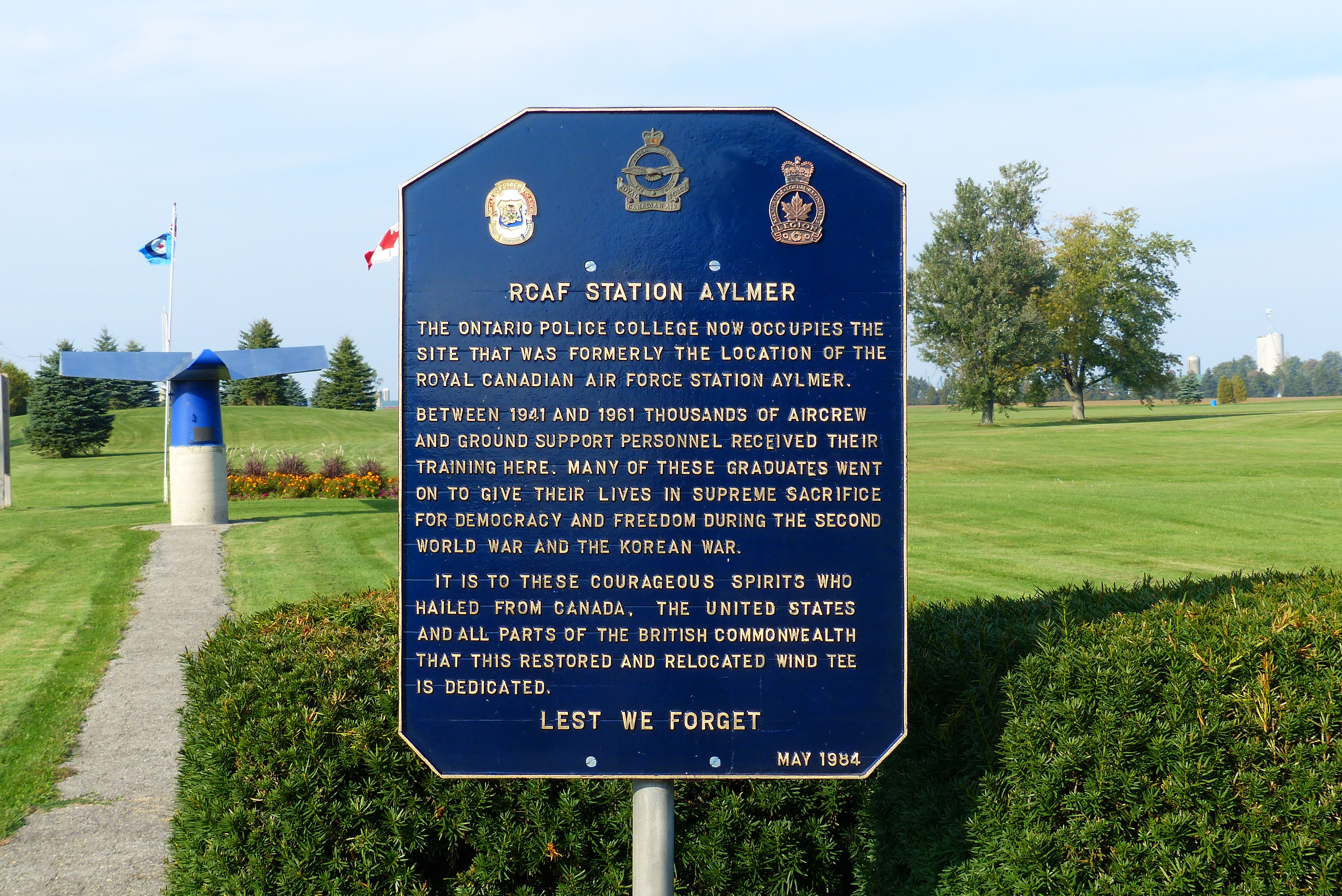
Historical plaque

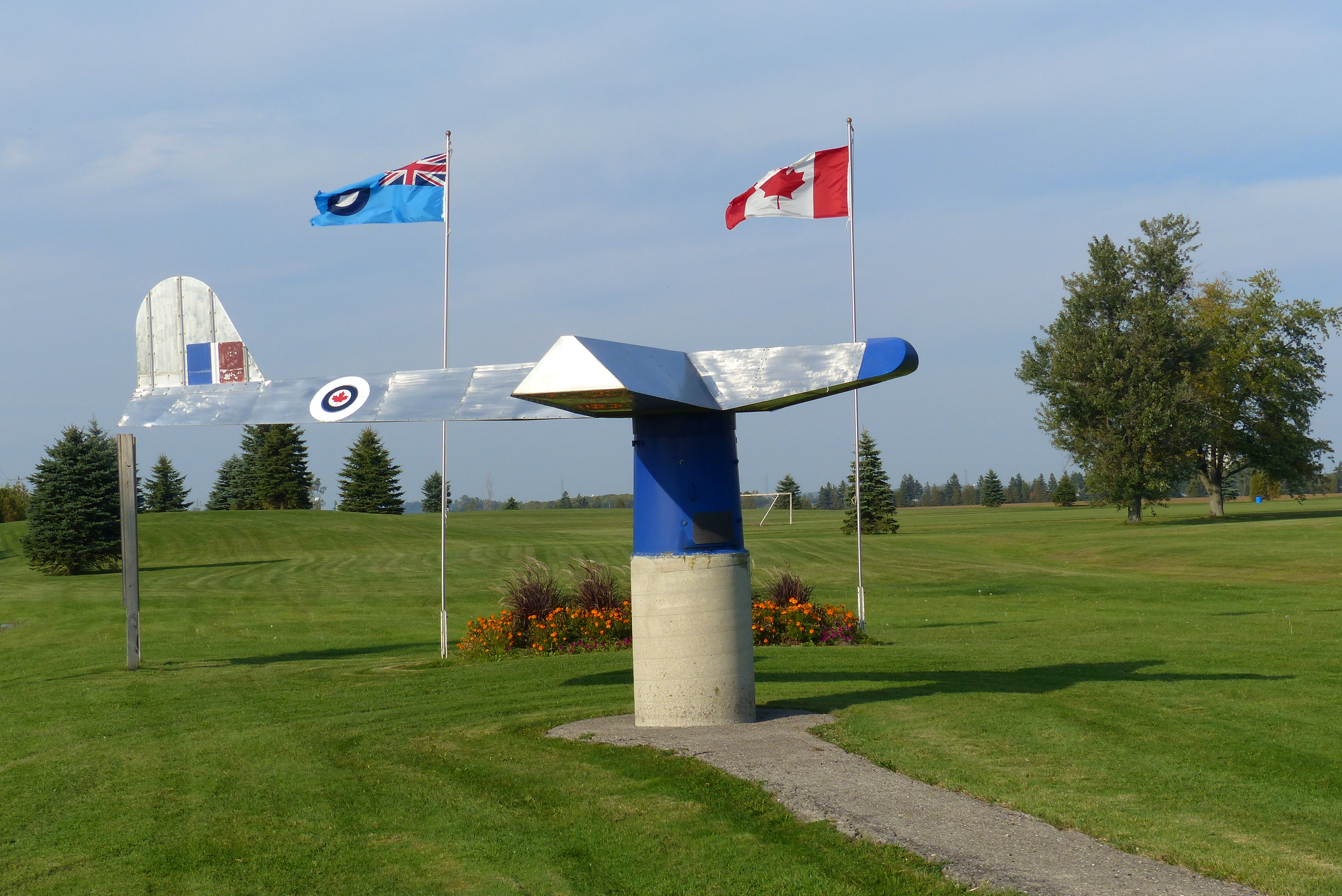
Memorial wind tee

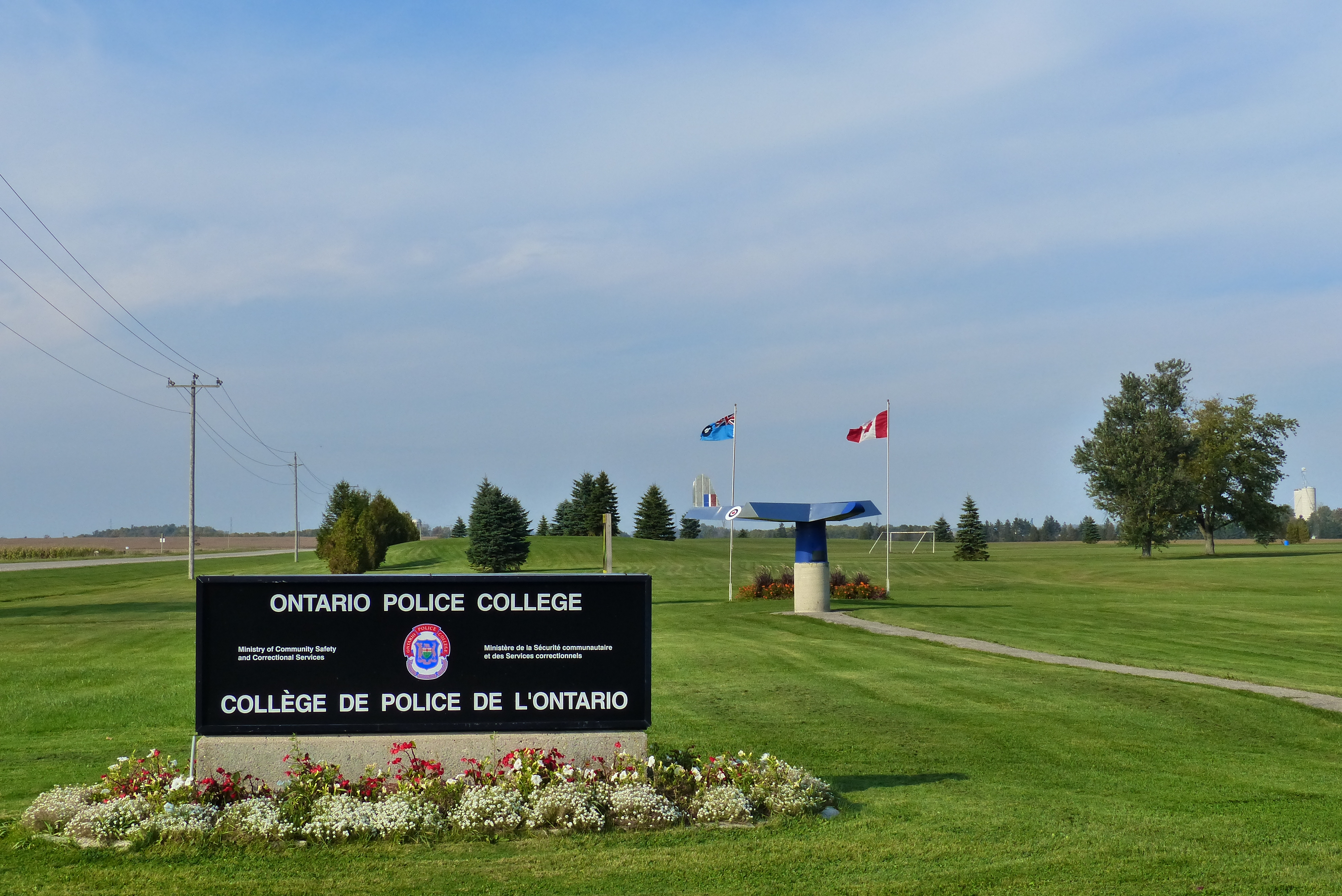
Ontario Police College sign

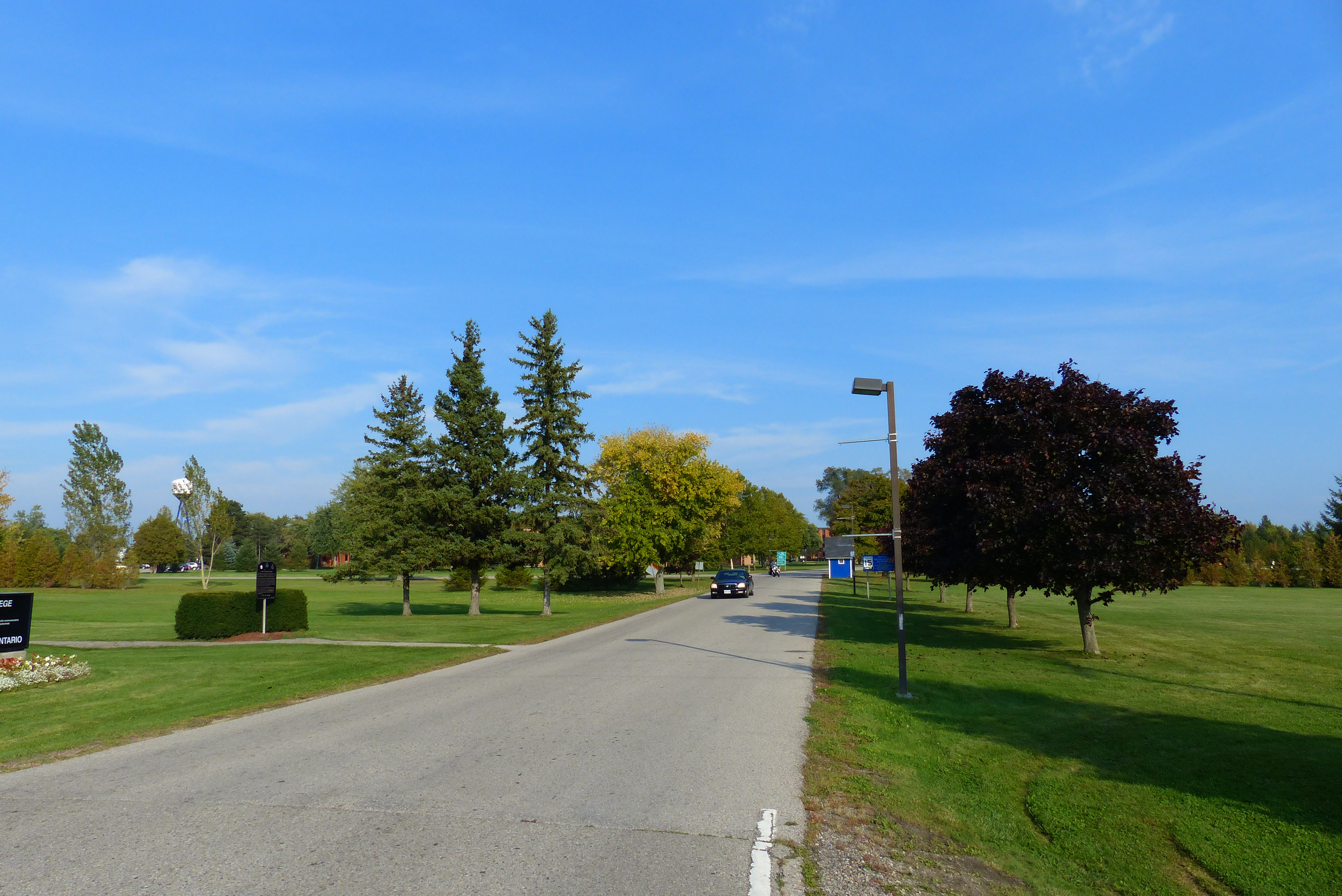
Entrance roadway
