= I Never Figured on This =

Single by David Thompson
- Released: 1981
- Genre: Country
- Label: Citation
- Songwriter(s): Marshall Wayne Gardner, David Thompson

David Thompson singles chronology
"Caught by Your Call" (1981)	"I Never Figured on This" (1981)	"You Never Really Loved Me" (1982)

"I Never Figured on This" is a single by Canadian country music artist David Thompson. The song debuted at number 44 on the RPM Country Tracks chart on September 26, 1981. It peaked at number one on December 26, 1981.

== Charts ==
Chart (1981)	Peak position
Canadian RPM Country Tracks	1
