= Michael Lysko =

Canadian sports commissioner (born 1961)

10th Commissioner of the CFL
- In office November 1, 2000 – March 20, 2002
- Preceded by: John Tory
- Succeeded by: David Braley (interim)

Personal details
- Born: February 5, 1961 (age 65) Aylmer, Ontario, Canada
- Education: University of Waterloo

Michael Lysko (born February 5, 1961) is a Canadian businessman who served as the tenth commissioner of the Canadian Football League from 2000 to 2002.

== Early business career ==
Lysko, a native of Aylmer, Ontario is a graduate from the University of Waterloo,

Lysko served as vice president of The Gem Group for three years until November 1, 2000, in which he signed a three-year contract worth $750,000 to take over as commissioner of the Canadian Football League.

== CFL Commissioner ==
Lysko was appointed the 10th commissioner of the Canadian Football League on November 1, 2000.

Among the goals Lysko had was to bring an expansion team to Ottawa, which had not seen a CFL franchise since the Ottawa Rough Riders folded in 1996. On October 21, 2001, the Ottawa Renegades was formed, but instability in the franchise led to its folding in 2006.

Lysko was fired as commissioner on March 20, 2002, following a revolt led by Toronto Argonauts owner Sherwood Schwarz, after he made critical and disparaging remarks towards him and the organization in regards to their hiring of Garth Drabinsky, who had been under investigation for alleged fraud at the time to serve as a team consultant.

Lysko was unanimously voted to be fired by the CFL Board of Governors shortly after his remarks became public. He had spent only 15 months on the job, and is the only commissioner in league history to be fired by the board.

== Post CFL career ==
After his firing, Lysko became the director of athletics at the University of Western Ontario, which included the renovations of TD Waterhouse Stadium, Alumni Hall and Thames Hall. However, Lysko left the position on July 20, 2007, citing his intentions to move close to his wife Kathryn's parents as among the reasons for his departure.

== See also ==
- List of University of Waterloo people
