= David Thompson (singer) =

- Born: April 4, 1950; Kapuskasing, Ontario
- Origin: Canada
- Died: November 9, 2010 (aged 60) Aylmer, Ontario
- Genre: Country
- Occupation: Singer
- Years active: 1978–1987
- Formerly of: Thunder Road

David Thompson (April 4, 1950 – November 9, 2010) was a Canadian country music singer. Thirteen of Thompson's singles made the RPM Country Tracks charts, including the number one single "I Never Figured on This." In 1984, Thompson became the lead singer of Thunder Road. His band members included Sean Borton, Darryl Murray, Bob Rogowski, and Boyd Faulconer.

Thompson died on November 9, 2010, in Aylmer, Ontario, at the age of 60.

== Discography ==
=== Singles ===
Year	Single	Peak positions	
Year	Single	CAN Country	CAN AC
1978	"Right to the End"	27	—
1978	"Midnight Cowboy"	31	—
1978	"Rachel I'm Just Not That Strong"	6	—
1979	"I Can't Help It"	31	—
1979	"Losers Bar & Grill"	21	—
1980	"My Broken Old Heart"	10	—
1981	"Caught by Your Call"	26	28
1981	"I Never Figured on This"	1	—
1982	"You Never Really Loved Me"	15	—
1982	"Giving Up Easy"	25	—
1983	"What's He Doin' at the Door?"	14	—
1983	"Nothing Left to Say, but Goodbye"	24	—
1984	"Why Do You Love to Torture Me"	58	—
