= Randy Fabi =

Canadian football player (born 1963)

No. 72, 73
- Positions: Slotback, Wide receiver

Personal information
- Born: 3 August 1963 (age 63); Regina, Saskatchewan
- Listed height: 6 ft 4 in (1.93 m)
- Listed weight: 205 lb (93 kg)

Career information
- High school: Oakville (ON) Trafalgar
- University: Western Ontario
- CFL draft: 1985: 8th round, 72nd overall pick

Career history
- 1986–1990: Winnipeg Blue Bombers
- 1991: Hamilton Tiger-Cats

Awards and highlights
- 76th Grey Cup champion

Randy Fabi (born 3 August 1963) is a Canadian former professional football player.

== Early life ==
Randy Fabi is the son of Transylvanian Saxons immigrants, CFL player Martin Fabi and Katherine Mergler. He grew up in Aylmer, Ontario and attended Oakville Trafalgar High School in Oakville, Ontario.

Fabi played for the Western Mustangs football team at the University of Western Ontario.

== Professional career ==
Following in his father's footsteps, Randy Fabi played in the Canadian Football League from 1986 to 1991. He played with the Winnipeg Blue Bombers from the 1986 CFL season to 1990, including winning the 76th Grey Cup in 1988. He played for the Hamilton Tiger-Cats for the 1991 CFL season.
