= Martin Fabi =

Canadian football player (1942–2023)

Profile
- Positions: Split end, punter

Personal information
- Born: November 1, 1942; Dipșa, Beszterce-Naszód County, Hungary
- Died: January 5, 2023 (aged 80); Guelph, Ontario, Canada

Career history
- 1962: Montreal Alouettes
- 1963–1965: Saskatchewan Roughriders

Awards and highlights
- CFL records: Most punting yards, regular season game (814); Most punts regular season game 18.

Martin Fabi (November 1, 1942 – January 5, 2023) was a professional Canadian football player. After his father was killed in World War II, the family fled to Austria in 1944. In 1953, Fabi and his family immigrated to Ontario, Canada, where they settled in the town of Aylmer.

In 1962, Fabi began playing in the Canadian Football League (CFL) with the Montreal Alouettes. He was traded to the Saskatchewan Roughriders in 1963 and played for Saskatchewan till 1965. He was a split end who also punted for the Roughriders. He holds the league records for most punting yards and most punts in a game. His records are 18 punts totalling 814 yards at Calgary on September 14, 1963. His son, Randy Fabi, also played in the CFL for the Winnipeg Blue Bombers and Hamilton Tiger-Cats.
