= Charles O. Bick College =

Canadian police college

Coordinates: 43.80653°N 79.27592°W

- Type: Police college
- Active: 1977–2009
- Affiliations: Toronto Police Service
- Location: Toronto, Ontario, Canada
- Website: www.torontopolice.on.ca/

Charles O. Bick College was a police college operated by the Training and Education unit of the Toronto Police Service to train various levels of police from new recruits to senior managers. The facility was accredited by the Ministry of Community Safety and Correctional Services to design and deliver specialized police courses. The facility was opened in 1977 and was located at 4620 Finch Avenue East in Scarborough and consisted of 14 classrooms, 2 computer labs, a range, pool and gymnasium. The college was made up of the following sections: Human Relations, Investigative Training, Officer Safety, Recruit Training, Police Vehicle Operations, Traffic and Provincial Statutes, Tactical Training - Firearms.

The college was named after Judge Charles O. Bick, founding chairman of the Metropolitan Toronto Police Commission.

The facility closed in July 2009, and was replaced by the new Toronto Police College located at 70 Birmingham Street in southern Etobicoke.

The 75830 square feet building sits on 2.33 arces lot. The building was last used by a private school, Ontario International College, for a brief period after the police vacated the premises. Royal Crown School, a private middle and high school, now occupies this building.

== See also ==
- Ontario Police College
