= Charles O. Bick =

Canadian police chairman (1909–1994)

Charles O. Bick (1909–1994) was the first chairman of the Metropolitan Toronto Board of Police Commissioners, the civilian body which oversaw the Metropolitan Toronto Police Force. He coined the service's slogan "To Serve and Protect".

An optometrist by profession, Bick was appointed to head the new body by Metropolitan Toronto Chairman Fred Gardiner in 1955 to oversee the amalgamation of the thirteen separate police forces that existed prior to the formation of Metropolitan Toronto. Bick initially met resistance as he was seen as an outsider with no background in policing and he clashed with police chief John Chisholm, particularly over questions of authority. Bick asserted that "under the Police Act, the control of the police department is in the hands of the commission," not the chief. Chisolm was unable to cope with the strain of managing the merging of thirteen separate police departments and committed suicide in High Park in 1958.

Bick remained chairman for 21 years until his retirement in 1977.

In order to meet the criteria to hold his office under the Ontario Police Act at the time he was appointed a magistrate and then a county court judge.

Bick advocated more training for police officers - Charles O. Bick College, the Toronto Police training facility from 1977 to 2009, was named after him.

Bick also used his position as police commission chairman to advance his ideas around law enforcement and the public good. He advocated the police sending people arrested for drunkenness to detoxification centres and calling for a public boycott of stores which sold pornography saying that they "weaken the moral fibre of society" and are "a major cause of juvenile crime." Nevertheless, he was an opponent of censorship. He also advocated stricter gun control laws.

He was born in Cannington, Ontario and graduated from the Ontario College of Optometry in Toronto in 1932. After working for an optometry office on Yonge Street for several years, he purchased the business in 1937.

Bick entered municipal politics and was elected to the town council of the Village of Forest Hill in 1949 succeeding Gardiner as reeve in 1953, the year it was incorporated into the new municipality of Metropolitan Toronto.

Preceded by none	Metropolitan Toronto Police Commission Chairman; 1955–1977	Succeeded by Philip Givens; 1977–1985
