= Tillsonburg Airport =

Tillsonburg Regional Airport
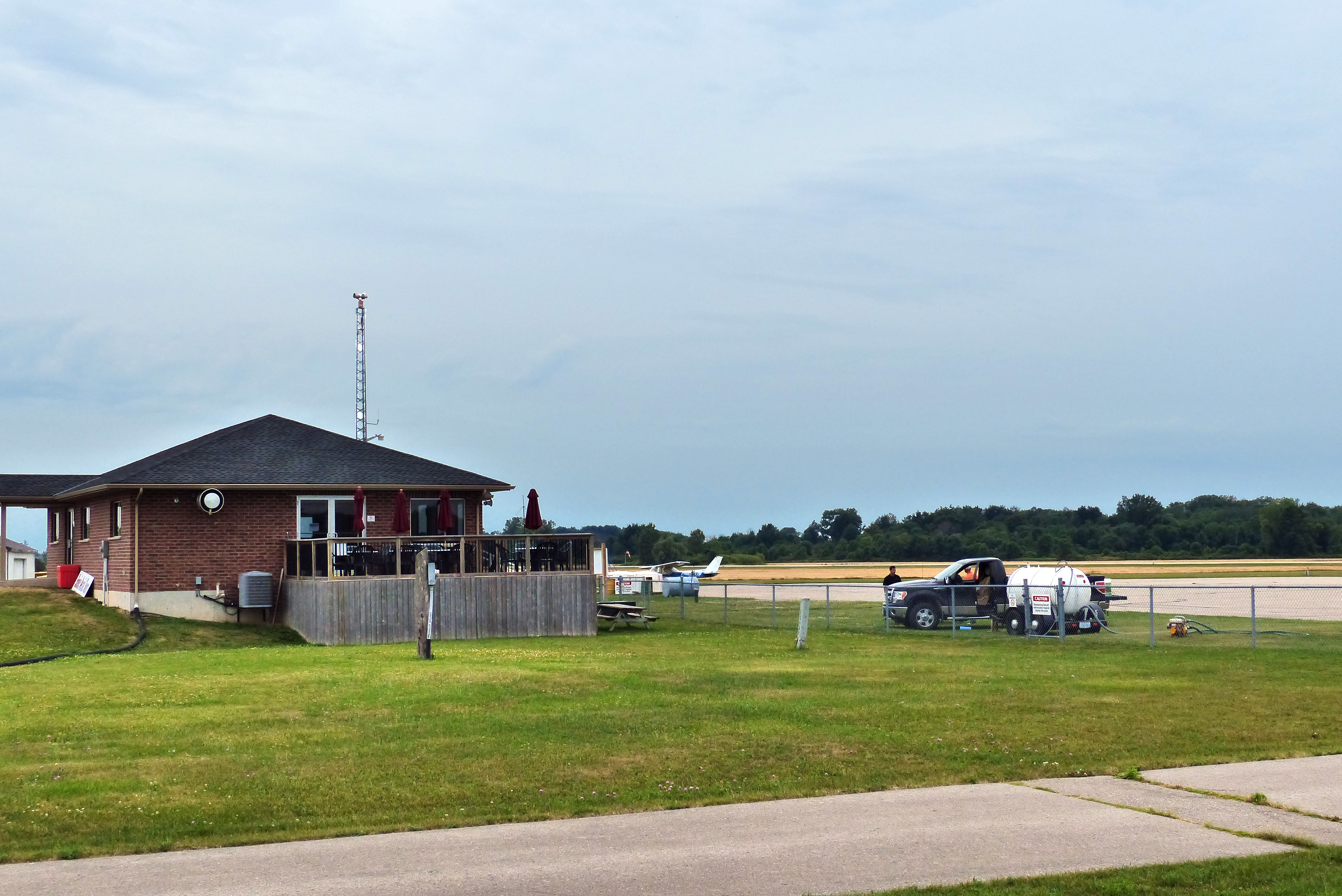
- IATA: none; ICAO: CYTB

Summary
- Airport type: Public
- Owner/Operator: Town of Tillsonburg
- Serves: Tillsonburg, also Oxford, Elgin and Norfolk Counties
- Location: South-West Oxford township - north of Tillsonburg, Ontario
- Time zone: EST (UTC−05:00)
  - Summer (DST): EDT (UTC−04:00)
- Elevation AMSL: 893 ft / 272 m
- Coordinates: 42°55′35″N 080°44′49″W
- Website: Tillsonburg Airport

Map
- Location in Ontario CYTB (Canada)

Runways
Direction	Length		Surface
Direction	ft	m	Surface
02/20	2,348	716	Grass
08/26	5,504	1,678	Asphalt
14/32	2,258	688	Grass

Statistics (2010)
- Aircraft movements: 10,142
- Source: Canada Flight Supplement; Movements from Statistics Canada

Tillsonburg Regional Airport (ICAO: CYTB) is located 3 nautical miles (5.6 km; 3.5 mi) north of Tillsonburg, Ontario, Canada.

The Tillsonburg Regional Airport was built during World War II as the secondary relief field, or R2, for Royal Canadian Air Force No. 14 Service Flying Training School in Aylmer, Ontario, part of the British Commonwealth Air Training Plan, and was purchased by the Town of Tillsonburg in 1970. The airport is a general aviation facility home to several organizations and businesses. Regular users of the airport include the Ontario Provincial Police, Ornge (Ontario Air Ambulance), Canadian Coast Guard and corporate aircraft.

The airport is home to the Canadian Harvard Aircraft Association (CHAA) which is headquartered at the airport and maintains a fleet of Harvard aircraft.

The airport has undergone a significant expansion and upgrade including the resurfacing of the main asphalt runway (08/26) and also lengthening it to 5,502 ft (1,677 m). A new terminal building was erected in 2010 and is located just south of the existing ATB.

The airport has a restaurant called the SkyWay Cafe which is open 7 days a week, serving breakfast and lunch until 2 pm.

The airport is owned and operated by the Town of Tillsonburg. From a governance perspective, there is also the Tillsonburg Airport Advisory Committee which provides recommendations to Tillsonburg Town Council. The current Chair of the TAAC is Mark Renaud.

The airport also has one flight school.

The Tillsonburg Regional Airport has the only paved runway in Oxford and nearby Norfolk Counties.

The airport is classified as an airport of entry by Nav Canada and is staffed by the Canada Border Services Agency (CBSA). CBSA officers at this airport can handle general aviation aircraft with up to 15 passengers.

Since the expansion in 2010; the airport continues to demonstrate increased take-offs and landings as evidenced by reports published by Transport Canada.

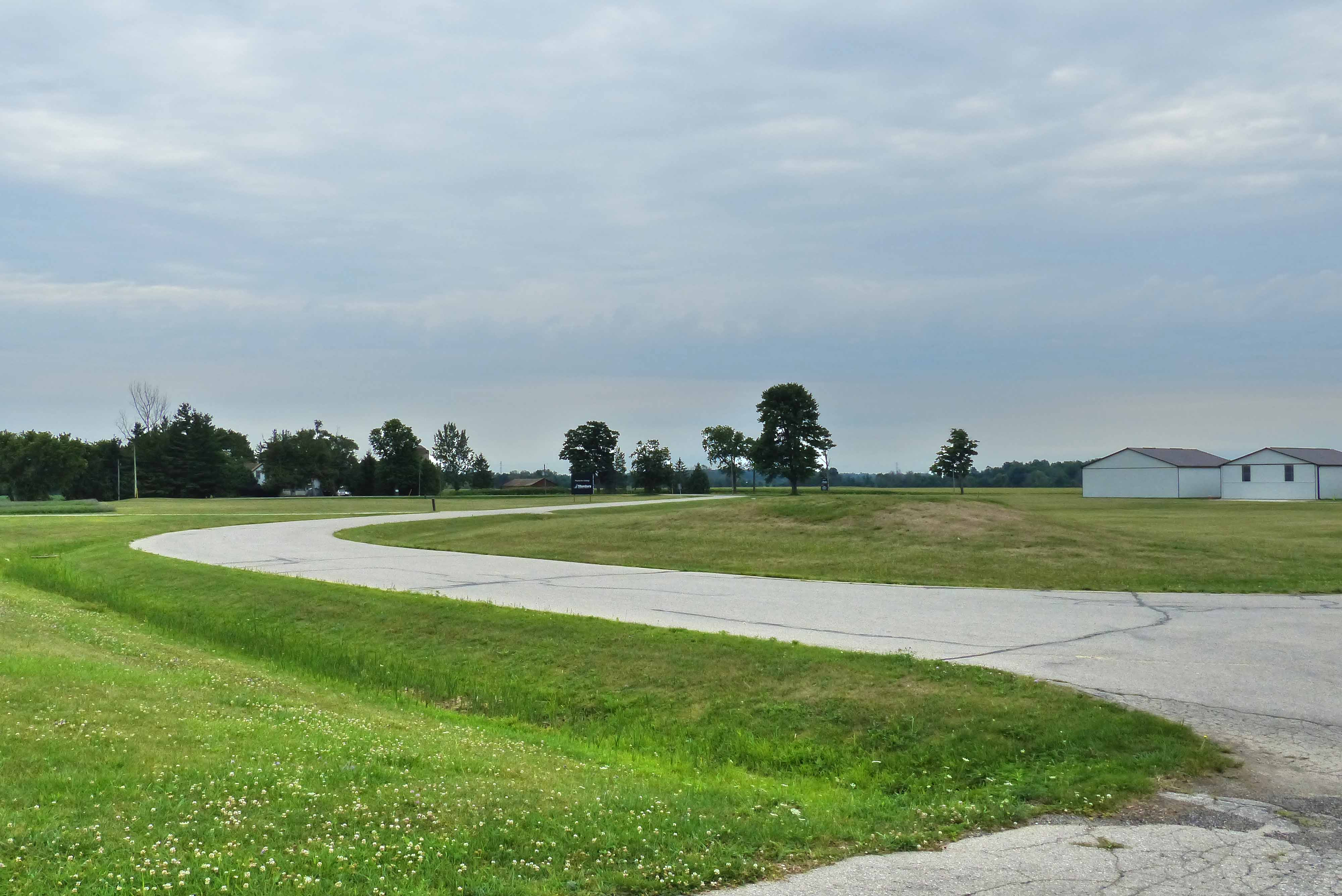
World War II driveway

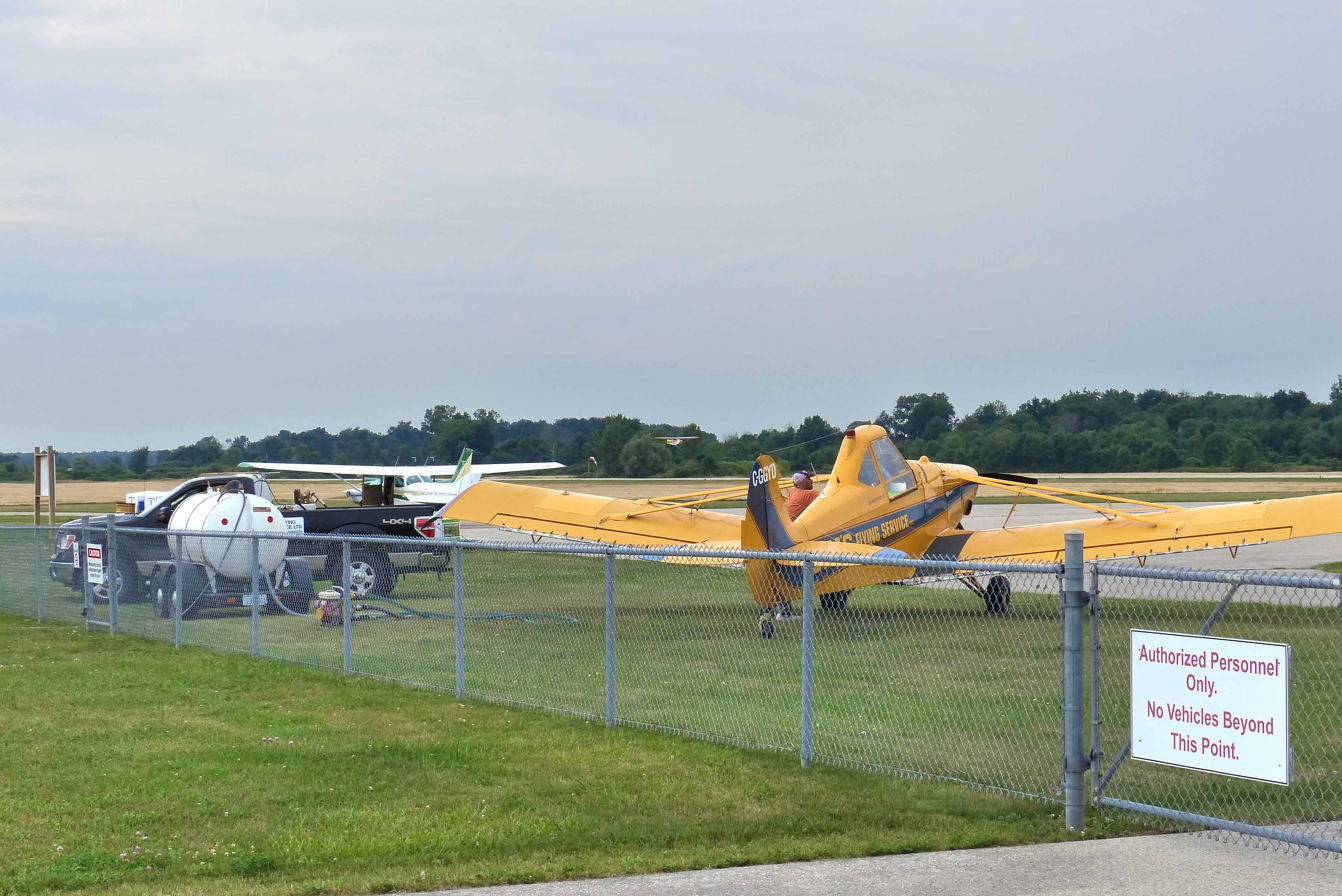
Jim's Flying Service filling up

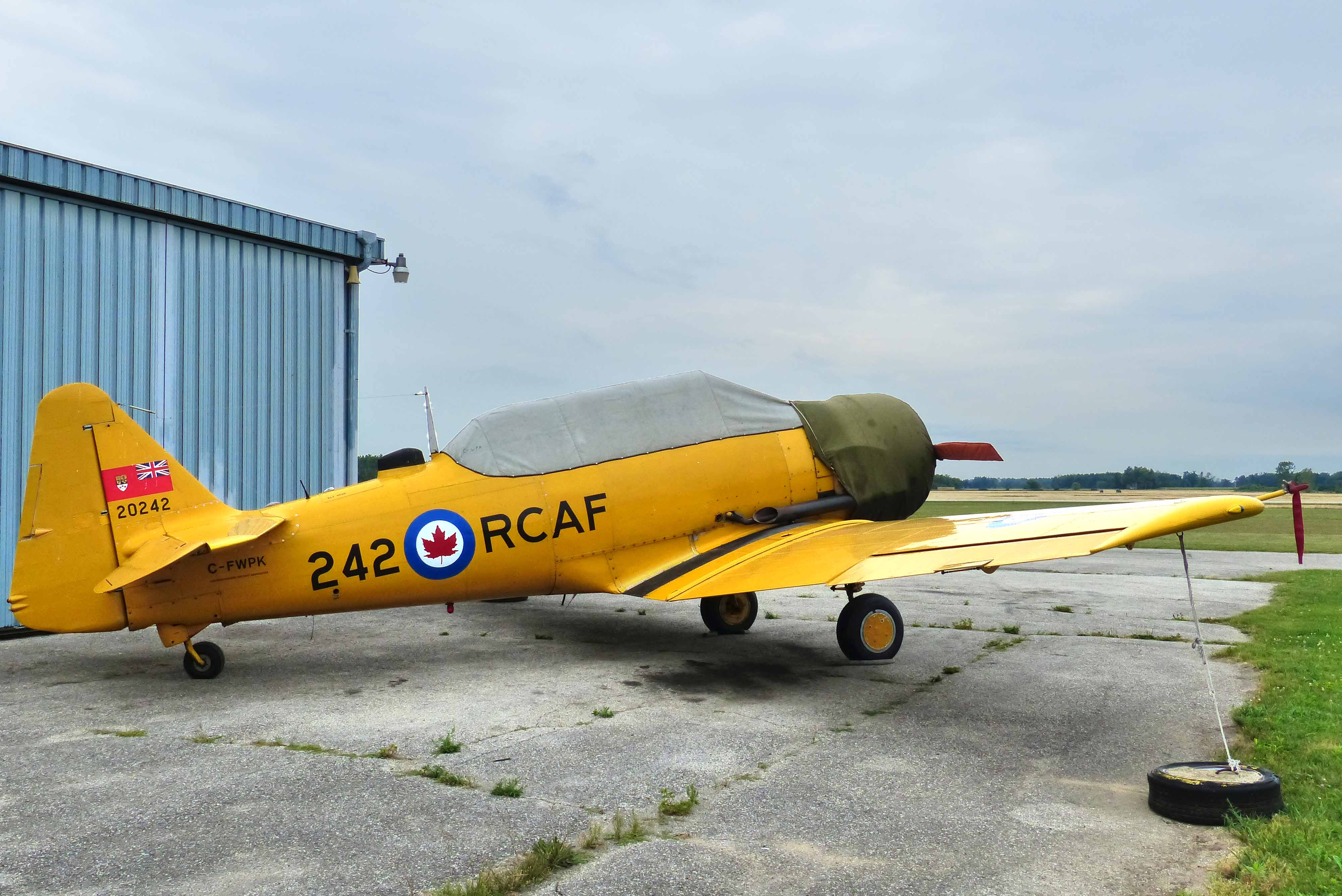
CHAA Harvard
