= Clifford Maracle =

Canadian Indigenous artist

- Born: 1944; Tyendinaga Reserve, Ontario, Canada
- Died: 1996 (aged 51–52)
- Known for: painter, sculptor

Clifford Lloyd Maracle (1944–1996) was a Canadian Indigenous artist from the Mohawk Nation, Tyendinaga Reserve near Deseronto, Ontario. Both a painter and a sculptor, he was best known for his depictions of the plight of urban Indians in the 1970s. Maracle did not rely on traditional motifs but rather established himself as a leader of a new expressionistic style among First Nations artists.

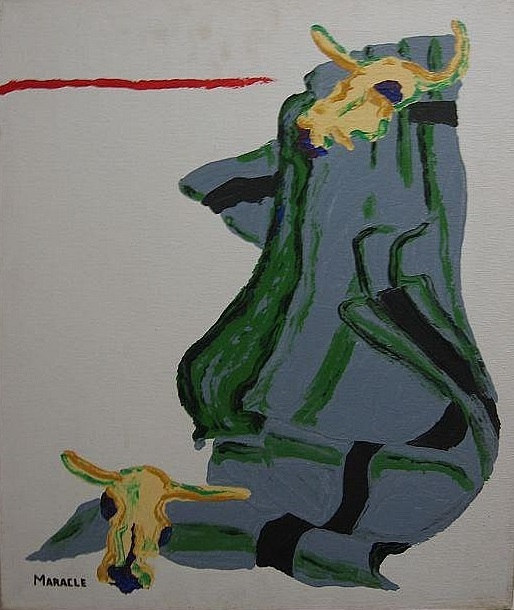
Figure 1 – "Grey Past" painting by Clifford Maracle

== Early life ==
Clifford Maracle was born in 1944 on the Tyendinaga Mohawk Territory Indian Reserve, Ontario, Canada. Maracle came from a large family of 10 children but his father left the family when the children were young. His mother received pressure from social workers who believed a single mother could not successfully raise the children; eventually, they left the reserve to avoid the conflicts. These events may have contributed to Maracle's strong feelings towards the injustices and prejudices his people endured. Maracle attended East Elgin Secondary School in Aylmer, Ontario, studied fine art at George Brown College, obtained an Honours Graduate degree from the Ontario College of Art in Toronto, and completed a Native Journalism course at the University of Western Ontario.

== Work ==
Maracle expressed himself (as did other Canadian modernist painters such as Carl Beam and Robert Houle) as an individual sometimes using identifiable native imagery and sometimes not, making irrelevant the debate of "authentically Indian" Maracle was influenced by the American artist Fritz Scholder. Maracle moved beyond the notion that all native artists draw their subjects from myth and legends and showed works based on political issues and ideas. By challenging the stereotypes of "Indian Art", Maracle found new ways of presenting the political moment by making audiences aware of the complex realities of aboriginal life. In 1984 he attached his Canadian Indian identity card to his painting "Changing Reserve" as a response to the poor conditions in Canadian Indian reserves.

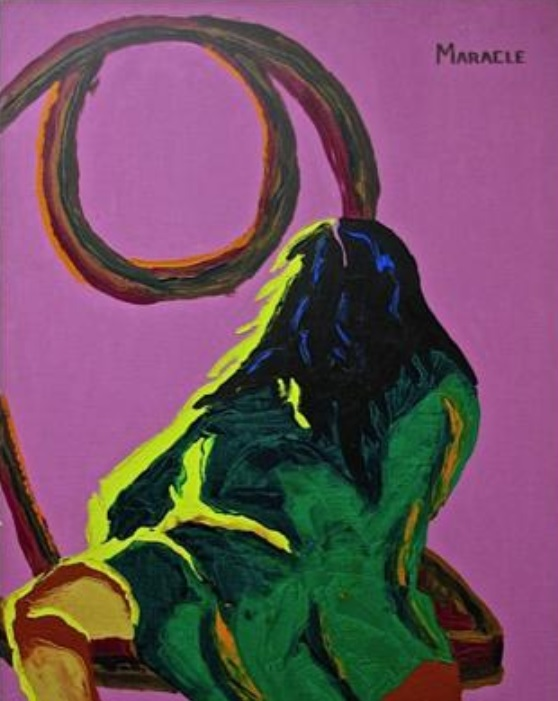
Figure 2 – "An Early Morning Climb" painting by Clifford Maracle

Many of Maracle's works were kinetic, depicting native dancers, historical events, animals, athletes. Maracle's dark humor is brought to light in his painting entitled "The Plight of the Urban Indian". It depicts three figures standing together: one has a gaping mouth with white teeth that glare out, another appears sombre with a drooping head, while the third appears complacent. A card adjacent to the installation described how the figures were meant to demonstrate the maladjustments, dislocations and disorientations of Natives within a dominant society that is sometimes hostile.

Maracle's artwork has been included in numerous group exhibitions since the mid/late 1970s, including the group exhibition "Oh So Iroquois", curated by Ryan Rice for The Ottawa Art Gallery.

== Solo shows ==
- 1985 Clifford Maracle: Paintings and Sculpture - Galerie Dresdnere, Toronto, ON
- 1994 Hard Edge Psychological Revelation - Maslak McLeod Canadian Art, Santa Fe, NM

== Group shows ==
- 1983 Indian Art '83 - Woodland Cultural Educational Centre, Brantford, ON
- 2007 Oh So Iroquois - Ottawa Art Gallery, Ottawa, ON
- 2010 Oh So Iroquois - Art Gallery of Southwestern Manitoba, Brandon, Manitoba
- 2012 Permanent Collection Spotlight – Thunder Bay Art Gallery. Thunder Bay, ON
- 2013 First People Land and Sky - Ingram Gallery, Toronto, ON
- 2013 First Nations Art 2013, Woodland Cultural Educational Centre, Brantford, ON

== Collections ==
- Canadian Museum of History
- Confederation Centre Art Gallery
- Nickle Arts Museum, University of Calgary
- McMichael Art Collection
- Thunder Bay Art Gallery
