= Fleet 60 Fort =

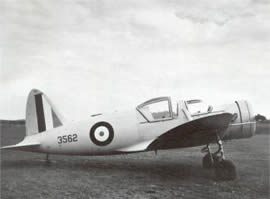
- Fleet Fort c. 1943

General information
- Type: trainer
- Manufacturer: Fleet Aircraft of Canada
- Primary user: Royal Canadian Air Force
- Number built: 101

History
- Manufactured: 1941- 1942
- Introduction date: 18 April 1941
- First flight: 22 March 1940
- Retired: 1945

The Fleet Model 60K Fort was the only aircraft designed and built by Canadians during the Second World War and was also the first all-metal monoplane built by Fleet Aircraft of Canada (Fort Erie). It was intended to be an intermediate trainer employed for pilot training between the de Havilland Tiger Moth primary trainer and the North American Harvard advanced trainer. Although it served with the British Commonwealth Air Training Plan, the Fort was redundant and was used to train wireless (radio) operators and had a relatively short operational career.

== Design and development ==
The Fort was originally designed as an advanced flying trainer and in 1940 orders were placed for 200 to be built for the British Commonwealth Air Training Plan. The Fleet 60 was designed as a monoplane with a low elliptical wing and a raised rear cockpit. An unusual feature was the fixed undercarriage. Although fixed, the undercarriage was fitted with a retractable fairing. This feature was intended to familiarize student pilots with an undercarriage retraction mechanism but without causing external damage by a forgetful student.

Production was delayed, however, as the first Royal Canadian Air Force (RCAF) model was not flying until 18 April 1941. The availability of the Fairchild Cornell, and a change in what constituted an "advanced" trainer, led to the contract's being sharply cut back, and only 101 Forts were ultimately delivered to the RCAF between June 1941 and June 1942.

== Operational history ==
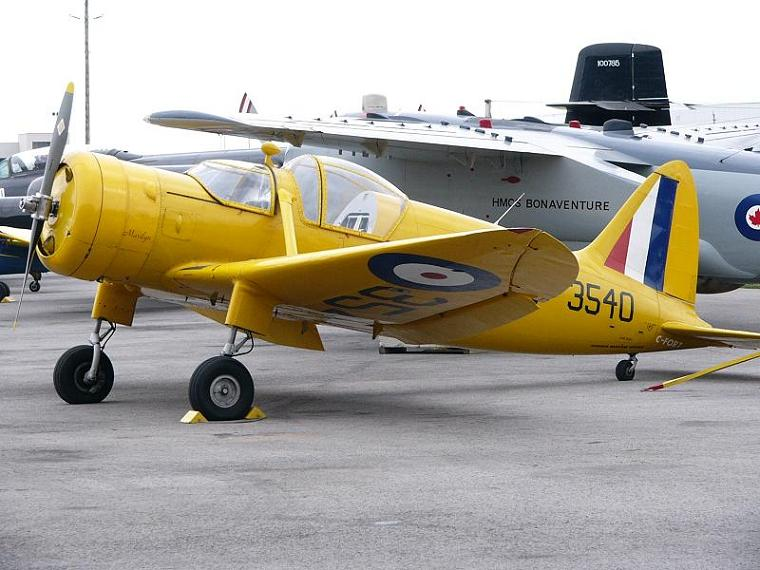
Fleet 60K Fort at the Canadian Warplane Heritage Museum, Hamilton, Ontario

Initially, the RCAF did not want to order the Model 60K, and their concerns proved valid. Pilot trainees found the Fort relatively easy to master, thereby making it unsuitable for transition to combat aircraft (e.g., Hawker Hurricane). Also, the RCAF decided that pilots who had soloed in Fleet Finches and de Havilland Tiger Moths could proceed to Harvards without training on Forts. The Forts were then used to train wireless operators at No. 2 Wireless School, Calgary and No. 3 Wireless School, Winnipeg.

Two models were built, one having a 250 hp (190 kW) Jacobs engine and the other having a 330 hp (250 kW) Jacobs. The more powerful engine gave the revised Fort a top speed of 193 mph (311 km/h) and the cruising speed 163 mph (262 km/h). It then climbed at 1,650 feet (500 m) per minute and had a range of 610 miles (980 km). Loaded weight was slightly increased to 2,900 pounds (1,300 kg).

The last Forts saw active service in 1944 and they were phased out of use by 1945; the last Model 60K was retired in 1946.

== Variants ==
- Model 60 : Proposed advanced trainer version, powered by a Jacobs L-7 radial piston engine. Not built.
- Model 60K : Two-seat intermediate training aircraft for the RCAF. RCAF designation Fort Mk I.
  - Fort Mk II : All 101 production aircraft were converted into wireless training aircraft for the RCAF
- Model 60L : Proposed version, powered by a Jacobs L-4MB radial piston engine. Not built.

== Specifications ==
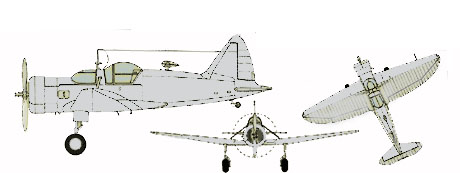
Profile views of the Fleet Fort.

Data from Jane's Vintage Aircraft Recognition Guide

General characteristics

- Crew: 2
- Length: 26 ft 10.3 in (8.18 m)
- Wingspan: 36 ft 0 in (10.97 m)
- Height: 8 ft 3 in (2.51 m)
- Wing area: 216 sq ft (20.07 m^{2})
- Empty weight: 2,530 lb (1,149 kg)
- Gross weight: 3,500 lb (1,589 kg)
- Powerplant: 1 × Jacobs L-6MB , 330 hp (246 kW)

Performance

- Cruise speed: 135 mph (217 km/h, 117 kn)
- Service ceiling: 15,000 ft (4,572 m)

== See also ==
Aircraft of comparable role, configuration, and era

- Miles Master
- Miles Mentor

Related lists

- List of aircraft of World War II
