= RCAF Station Jarvis =

Former Royal Canadian Air Force station

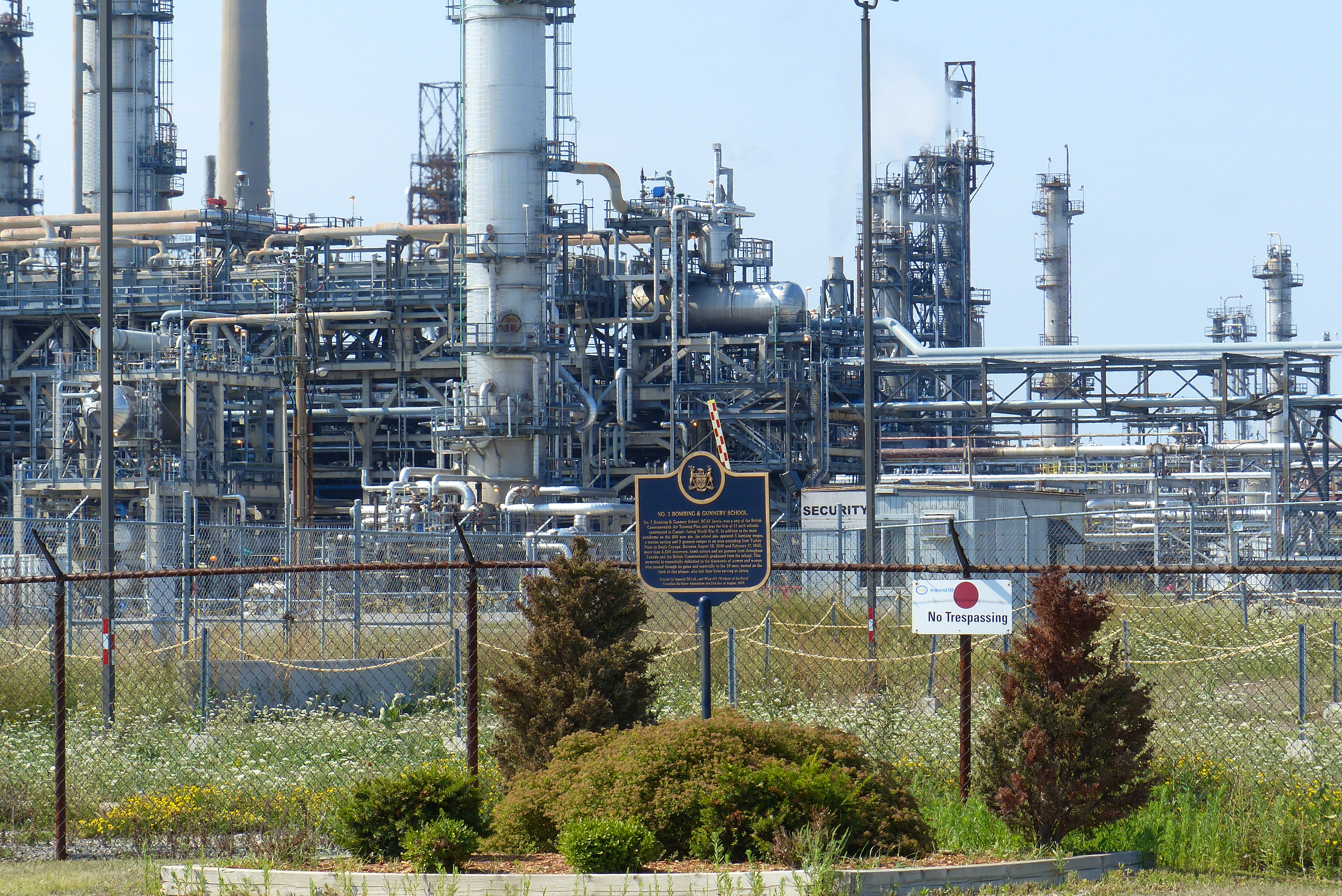
- The site of No. 1 B&GS in 2014.
- Active: 19 August 1940 – 17 February 1945
- Country: Canada
- Branch: Royal Canadian Air Force
- Role: British Commonwealth Air Training Plan; Aircrew training
- Part of: No. 1 Training Command
- Schools: No. 1 Bombing and Gunnery School
- Station Magazine: The Fly Paper

Commanders
- G/C: G. E. Wait – 1940
- W/C: W. F. Hanna – 1942
- G/C: A. D. Bell-Irving, MC – 1942
- W/C: W. Peace, DFC – 1943
- G/C: W. J. McFarlane – 1944

Aircraft flown
- Trainer: Avro Anson; Fairey Battle; Westland Lysander; Bristol Bolingbroke; North American Yale; North American Harvard

Royal Canadian Air Force Station Jarvis was a Second World War British Commonwealth Air Training Plan (BCATP) station located near Jarvis, Ontario. The station was home to No. 1 Bombing and Gunnery School and is usually known by that name. (Note: the standard short form is No. 1 B.&G.S. also shortened as No. 1 B&GS or 1 B&G'.) Bombing and Gunnery schools trained Air Gunners, Wireless Air Gunners, Air Observers, Air Bombers, and Navigator-Bomb Aimers. These airmen served as aircrew on bombers and maritime patrol aircraft.

The British Commonwealth Air Training Plan was a temporary wartime measure that ended on 29 March 1945. No. 1 B&GS opened on 19 August 1940 and closed on 17 February 1945. During this time 6,500 airmen were trained at Jarvis.

== Site selection and startup ==
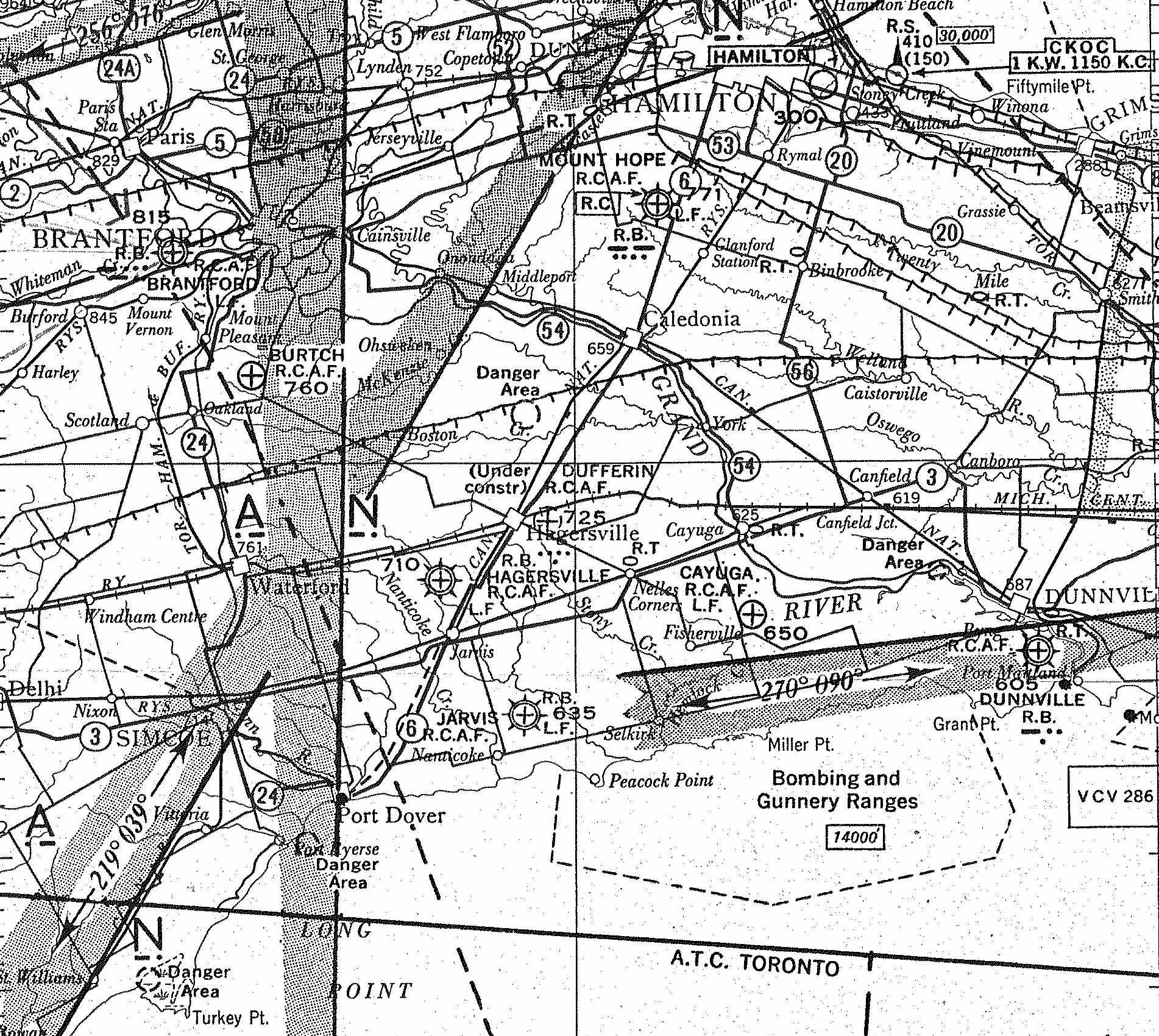
1944 Navigation chart showing RCAF Jarvis and surrounding area. North is up, Lake Erie at bottom.

Like most of the BCATP airfields, the station at Jarvis was located in a sparsely populated rural area close to rail lines and highways. Like the other Bombing and Gunnery Schools, a body of water was nearby, in this case Lake Erie, which provided space for bombing and gunnery ranges.

In 1934, American Airlines built an emergency landing strip six kilometres southeast of Jarvis. This airstrip included a beacon light, radio range, and radio operator. The Royal Canadian Air Force (RCAF) used this airfield as the site for No. 1 B&GS.

Construction of the airfield and facilities overlapped with the start-up of training operations. Contractors arrived on the site on 11 April 1940, followed by an advance party of airmen on 25 July 1940. The first six aircraft, Fairey Battles, flew in on 9 August 1940, and just ten days later the school opened with a class of 39 air observer trainees. Initial construction continued until early 1941.

== Aircrew trades and training ==
Five different aircrew trades were trained at No. 1 B&GS. The original trades in 1940 were Air Observer, Air Gunner, and Wireless Air Gunner. By 1942 Commonwealth aircraft, their missions, and their crews had changed, and so did the trades. The Air Bomber and Navigator "B" (Bomb Aimer) trades were introduced in the summer of 1942.

Most trades required access to both bombing and gunnery training, but the time spent in each section of the school varied depending on the trade. Air Gunners advanced from basic training at a Manning Depot to a 12-week gunnery course at Bombing and Gunnery School. After basic training Wireless Air Gunners went to Wireless School for 28 weeks and then came to Bombing and Gunnery School for a 4-week gunnery course. Air Gunners and Wireless Air Gunners were sent to Operational Training Units after their gunnery course.

Air Observers, Air Bombers, and Navigator–Bomb Aimers spent 8 weeks at bombing and gunnery school before moving on to Air Navigation School.

== Instruction ==
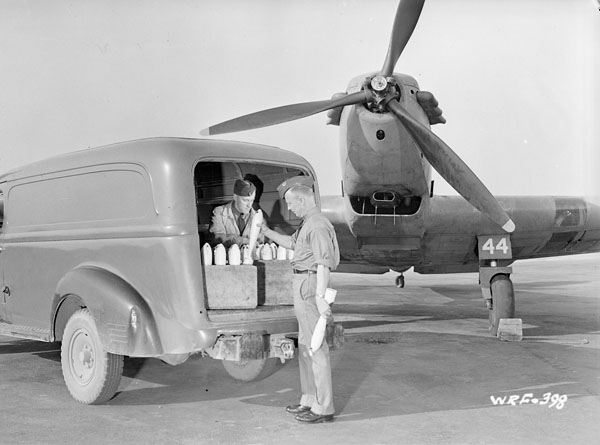
Armourers loading practice bombs at Jarvis in July 1941

The same pattern of instruction was used for both bombing and gunnery skills: ground-based classroom and simulator training followed by aerial exercises. The amount of time spent in the air was low, especially between 1940 and 1942. During this early period air observers received 20 hours of aerial practice, and air gunners only 7 hours.

Bombing students learned how to use and maintain bombsights, direct the aircraft pilot during the bomb run ("right steady steady left left"), release the bombs, and record the results. Trainees dropped 5.2 kg practice bombs from Fairey Battles, Avro Ansons, or Bristol Bolingbrokes.

Gunnery students learned how to load, aim, fire, and clean Commonwealth .303 machine guns. They started by hand firing live ammunition on the 25 yard range and moved on to firing the ground-based aircraft gun turret at Hoover's Point. The final step was air-to-ground and air-to-air firing from Fairey Battles at ground targets or airborne drogues towed by Lysanders. Equipment for gunnery training included:

- Vickers Gas Operated (G.O.) machine gun
- Browning .303 machine gun
- Boulton Paul gun turret
- Frazer-Nash gun turret
- Gun camera
- .303 Commonwealth ammunition

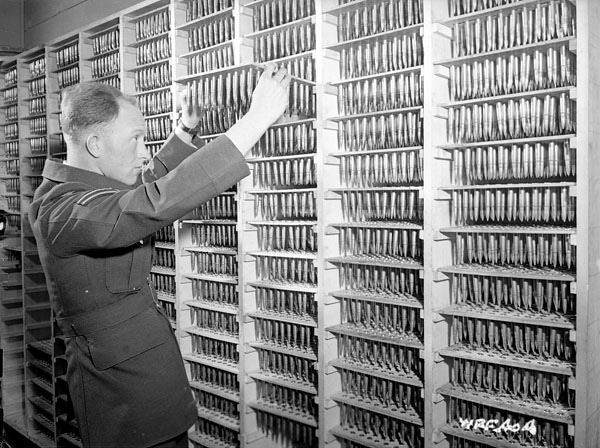
Corporal checking ammunition at Jarvis in July 1941

In November 1941, night aerial instruction was introduced, and on some occasions aerial training took place 24 hours per day. By 1943, bombing and gunnery courses had been lengthened. Air Bomber trainee LAC Edmon Ryerse spent 36 hours in the air in 1943, during which time he dropped 86 practice bombs and fired 1,600 rounds of .303 ammunition from a Bolingbroke.

Bombing and gunnery trainees were required to master other skills as well. For example, to meet the standard for the Aircraft Recognition skill they had to learn to visually identify 72 different types of aircraft.

== Airmen and airwomen of 1 B&GS ==
A large number of American volunteers served as staff pilots at the school. Staff pilots flew a target-tow aircraft, or flew a bomber for trainee gunners and bomb aimers. In January 1941, 55 of the 70 staff pilots at Jarvis were Americans. On 19 May 1942, 23 American staff pilots and 11 other American airmen stationed at Jarvis resigned from the RCAF and left to join the United States Army Air Corps.

The first trainees at Jarvis were Canadians, followed by Australians, British, Newfoundlanders, New Zealanders, Norwegians, and Poles in early 1941. In 1942, a Belgian trainee graduated.

Women were admitted to the Royal Canadian Air Force in 1941 as members of the Women's Division - the WDs. The first WDs, 70 in number, arrived at Jarvis on 27 April 1942, and within six months airwomen were serving in many areas of the station, including the control tower, the bomb plotting office, the kitchens, and the stores. Airwomen were not permitted to serve as aircrew.

A key member of the famous "Dambusters" (No. 617 Squadron RAF) trained at Jarvis: RCAF navigator, Harlo “Terry” Taerum. In May 1943, in Operation Chastise, commonly known as the "Dambusters Raid," he successfully navigated the lead Avro Lancaster bomber (piloted by Guy Gibson), at night and at very low level, to its target, a German power dam. Raised on a farm near Milo, Alberta, he was killed on a later raid in September 1943.

== Facilities ==
The school's facilities included an airfield and camp, marine units at Port Dover and the mouth of Nanticoke Creek, and a 29-kilometre-long bombing and gunnery range over Lake Erie. Individual bombing targets were located along the shoreline at Evans' Point, Peacock Point, Port Ryerse, and Turkey Point, and there was a land target 6 kilometres north of Hagersville. Observation towers, quadrant huts, secondary control towers, and motor transport sections were associated with these targets.

A gunnery range featuring a gun turret mounted on rails was installed on leased property at Hoover's Point.

The airfield, marine units, and bombing and gunnery ranges were connected by a private telephone network.

=== Aerodrome information ===
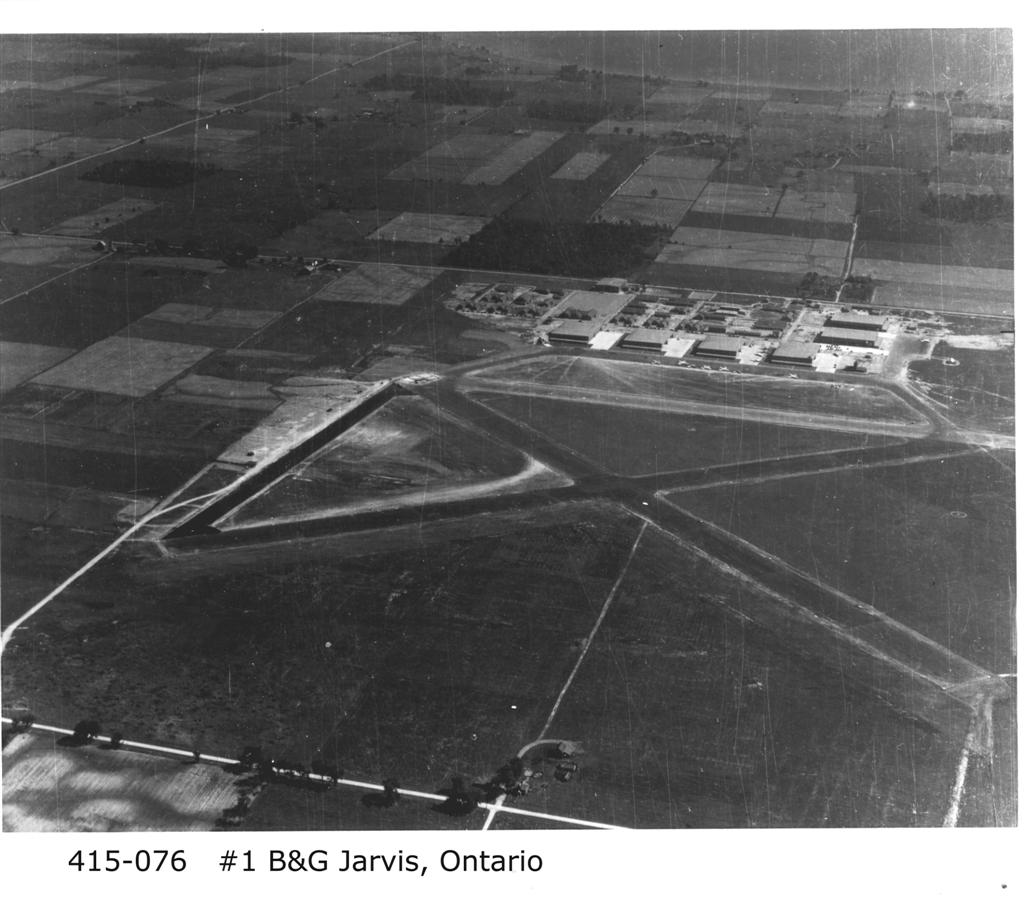
No. 1 B&GS in the 1940s

In 1942, the aerodrome was listed as RCAF Aerodrome - Jarvis, Ontario at 42°50′N 080°03′W with a magnetic variation of 6 degrees west and elevation of 635 ft (194 m). There were three runways:

Runway Name	Length	Width	Surface
8/26	3,054 ft (931 m)	150 ft (46 m)	Hard surfaced
13/31	3,000 ft (910 m)	150 ft (46 m)	Hard surfaced
4/22	3,100 ft (940 m)	150 ft (46 m)	Hard surfaced

== "Taken on Strength" ==
When a person joined the staff at Jarvis, or a piece of equipment was delivered, an entry was made in the station's records. The person or equipment had been officially taken on strength.

By 31 December 1940, 70 officers, 556 airmen, 97 trainees, 18 attachments, and 115 civilians, a total of 856 people, were on strength at Jarvis.

Two years later, 93 officers, 977 airmen, 244 trainees, 14 others and 121 civilians, a total of 1,449 people, were on the books. The station was home to a fleet of 99 aircraft: 35 Ansons, 34 Bolingbrokes, 19 Lysanders, 9 Battles, 1 Yale and 1 Harvard.

At the peak of training activity in December 1943, 1,857 men and women, including 147 civilians, were on strength at Jarvis.

== Notable events at No. 1 B&GS ==
- 29 September 1940 – first class of Air Observers graduates
- 25 March 1941 – producers for the Hollywood movie Captains of the Clouds visit the station
- 27 August 1941 – Royal Visit by Prince George, Duke of Kent
- 20 December 1941 – first Wireless Air Gunners from No. 4 Wireless School graduate
- 1 January 1943 – dance is held featuring Mart Kenney and his Western Gentlemen
- 1 September 1943 – Wing Commander Guy Gibson VC DSO* DFC* visits
- 16 August 1944 – 6,000 people attend an open house called "Jamboree and Sports Day"
- 2 February 1945 – last class of Wireless Air Gunners and Air Bombers graduates

== Honours and awards ==
While flying at night on 27 October 1942, Pilot Officer (P/O) John Williams spotted a train on fire near Jarvis. He landed at Jarvis and organized a work party to put out the fire. Williams was awarded the George Medal for his actions. Other airmen in this party were Sgt. R. Picard, L. Mayhew, Leading Aircraftman P.H. Gibson and (RAF) J. Turnstall. Picard received the British Empire Medal. The train consisted of tank cars filled with gasoline, some of which had already exploded when the airmen arrived on the scene.

== Postwar ==
By 1947, the Crown Assets Disposal Corporation had scrapped the airplanes, dismantled the hangars and other buildings and sold them off, and cleared the site. For eight years it was leased to local farmers and then sold to Russell and Larry Hare, whose farm adjoined the airfield. In 1955 the site was turned into an automobile race track called Harewood Acres by the British Empire Motor Club of Toronto. Other uses were made until the property was sold in 1974 to Texaco Canada and turned into the Nanticoke Oil Refinery, which started producing oil products on 17 November 1978. In 2014 the refinery remains in operation as an Imperial Oil facility.

On 21 August 1993, Imperial Oil and 412 Wing of the Royal Canadian Air Force Association erected a historical plaque dedicated to the personnel who served at the station, with the reverse side of the plaque commemorating the thirty-eight Commonwealth airmen and one civilian who died while serving at No. 1 B&GS. Another memorial to those who died serving at Jarvis, this one in stone, is located at RCAF Station Dunnville, where there is a museum dedicated to the BCATP.

Robert Schweyer collected material about No. 1 Bombing and Gunnery School for many years. His book about the school, Sights on Jarvis, was published in 2003.

== Scenes from No. 1 B&GS ==
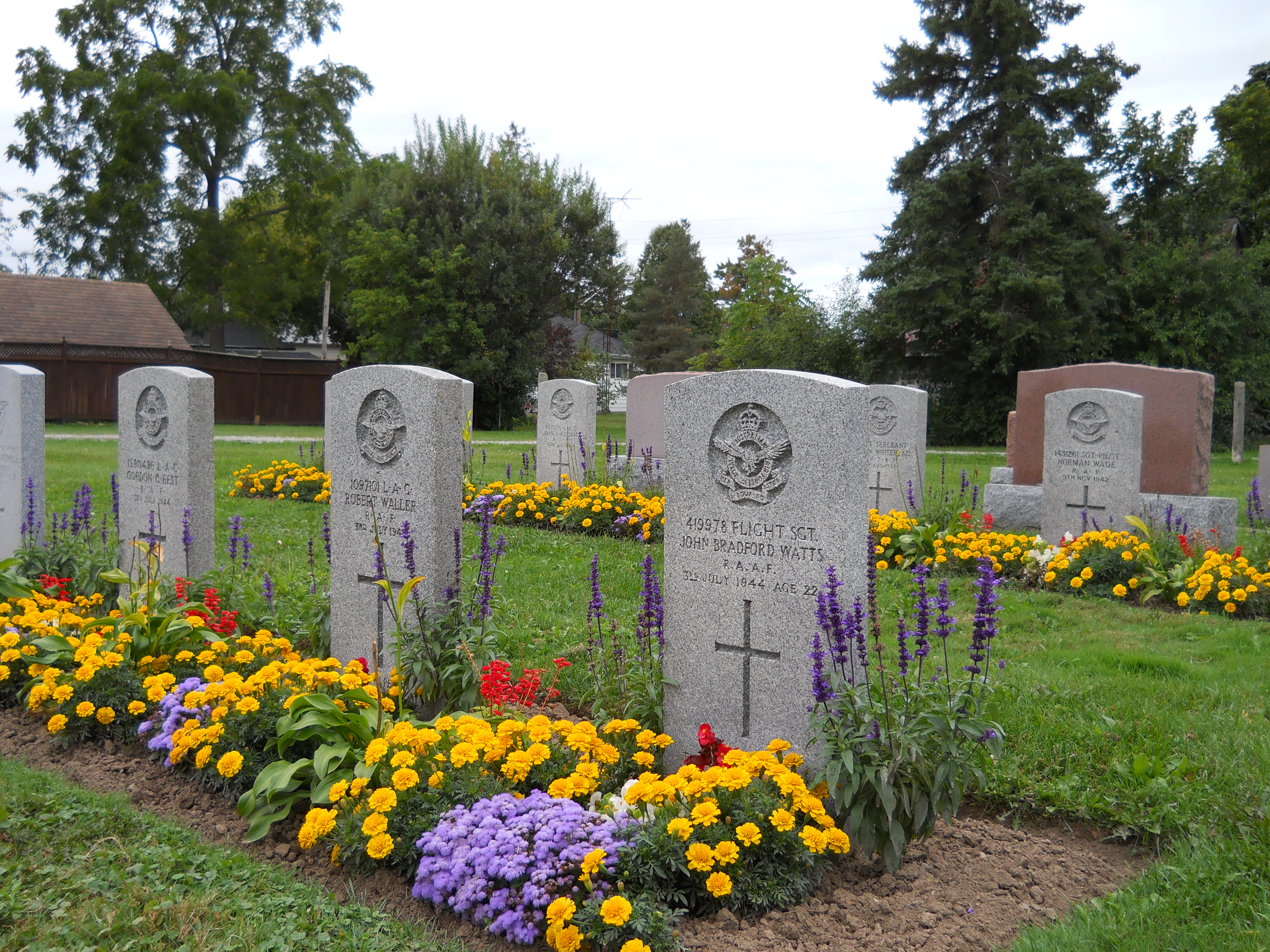
Fallen Commonwealth Airmen at Jarvis, Ontario

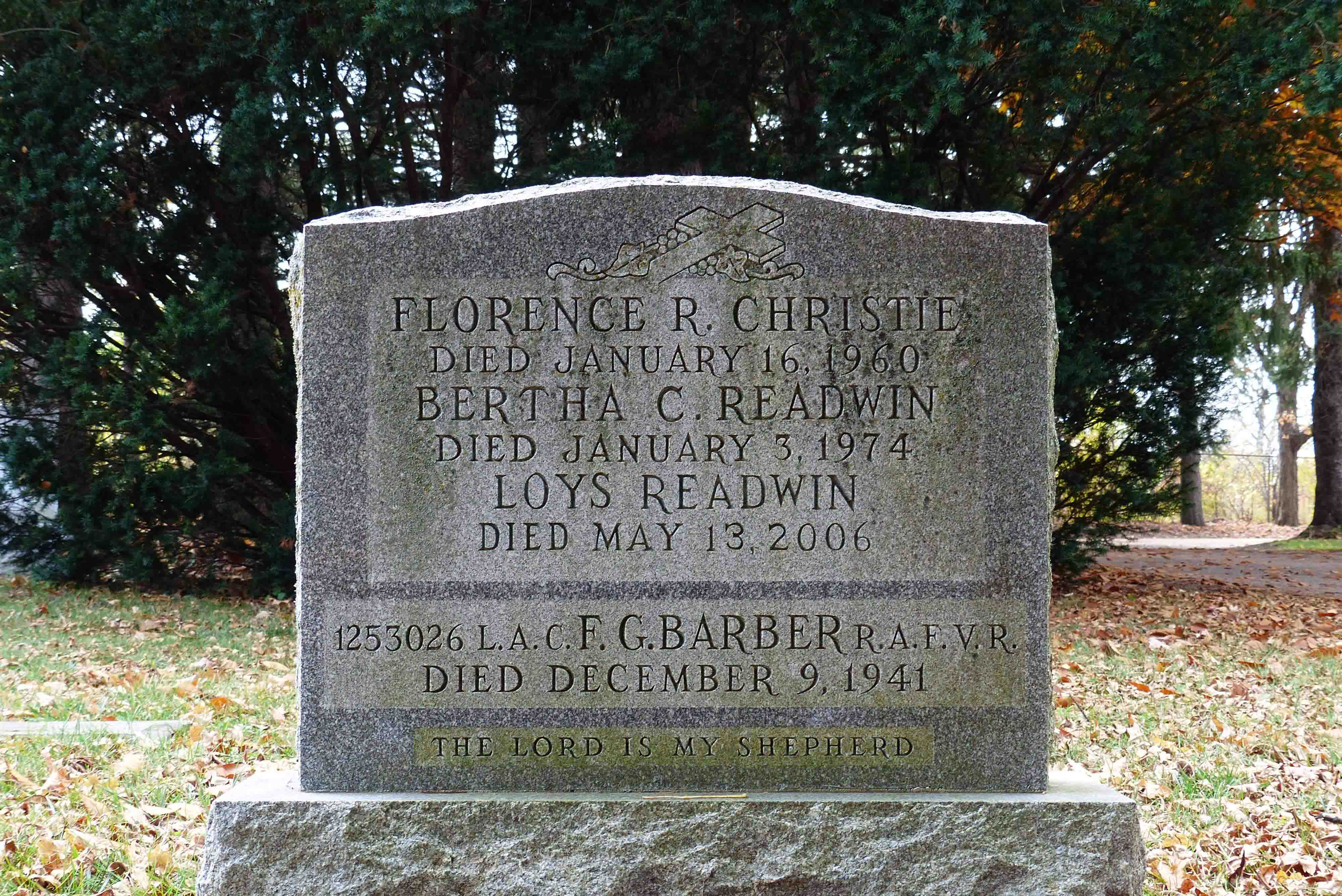
Jarvis RAF casualty in Guelph, Ontario

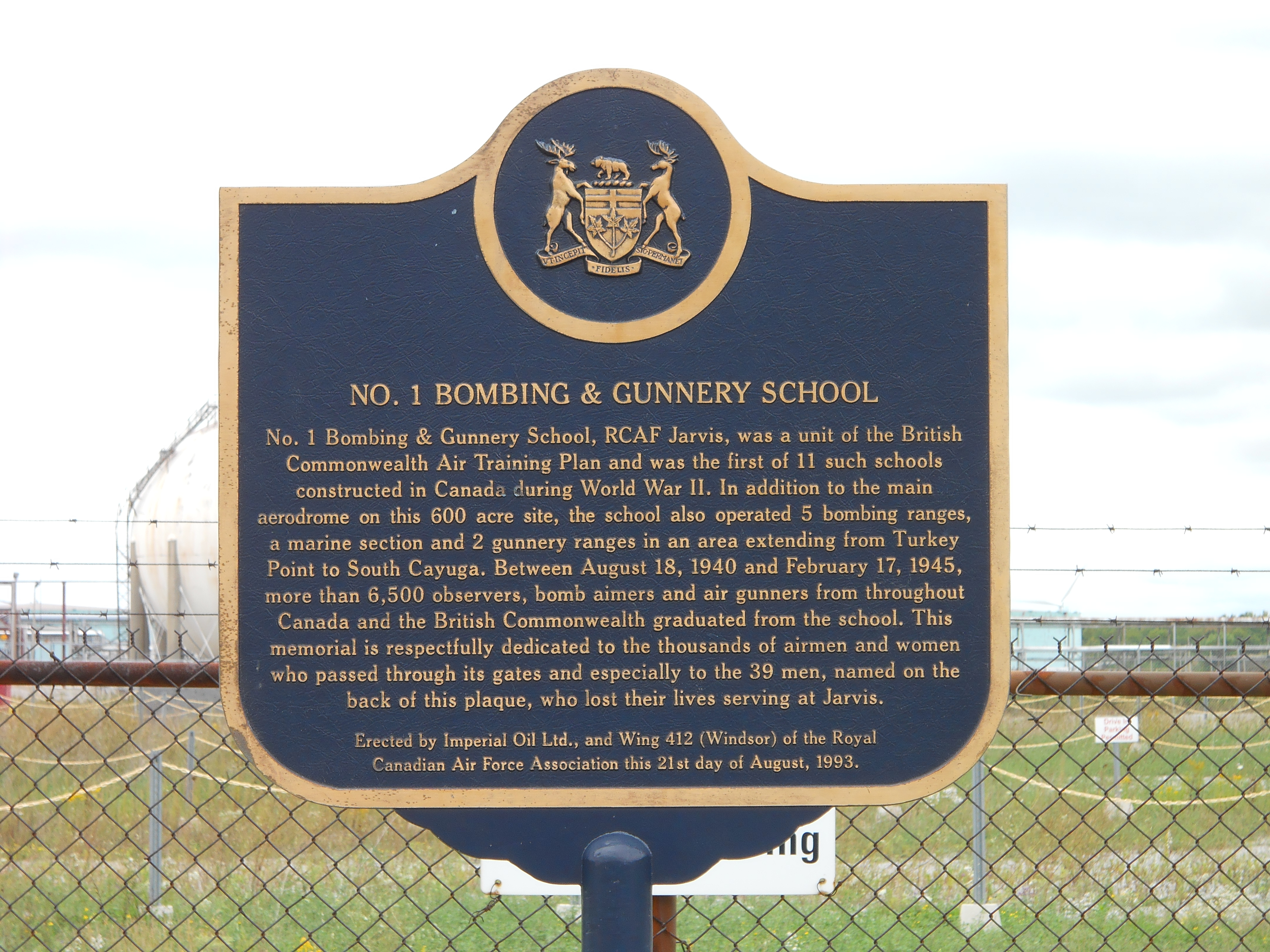
Historical plaque at the site of No. 1 B&GS

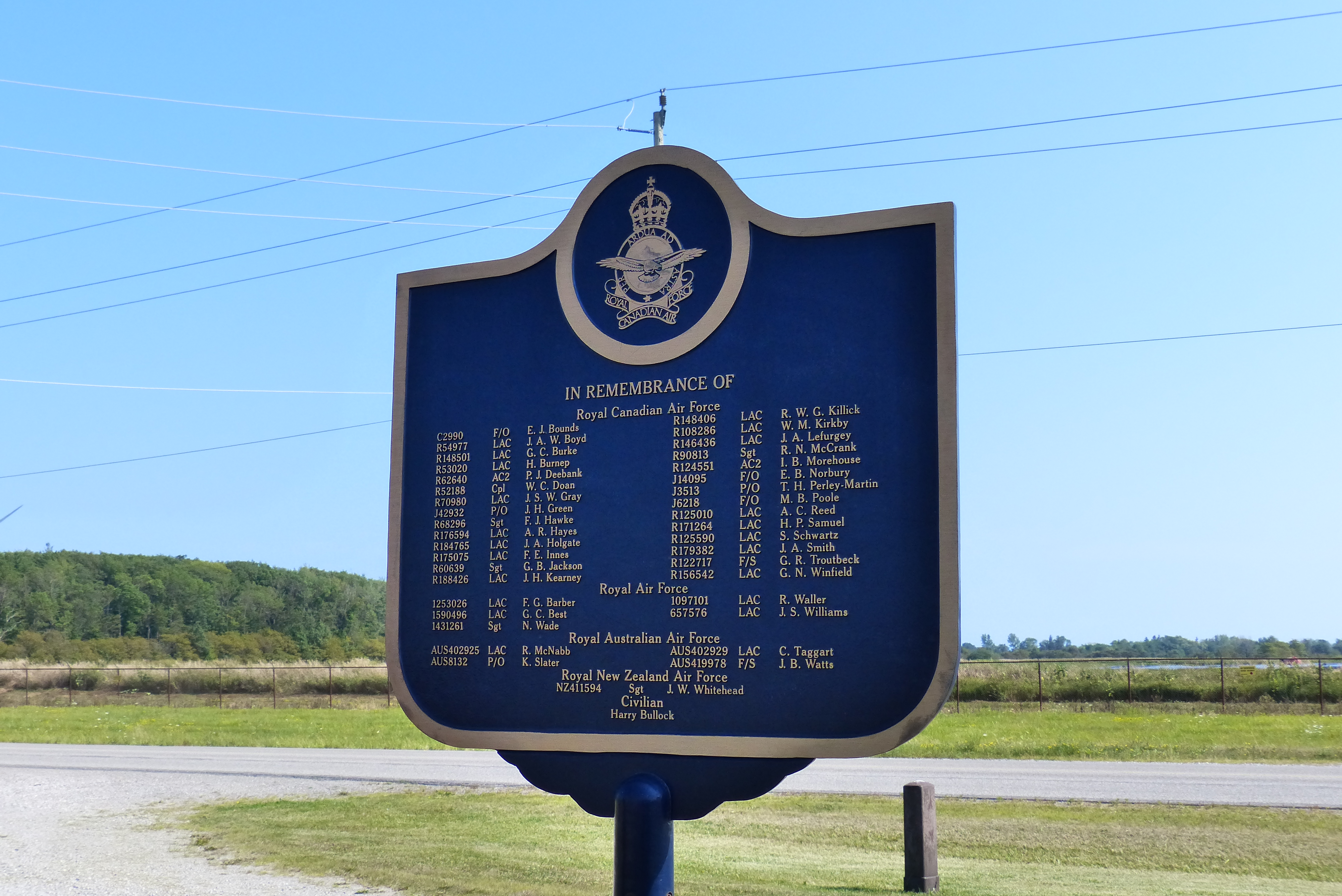
Reverse side of plaque

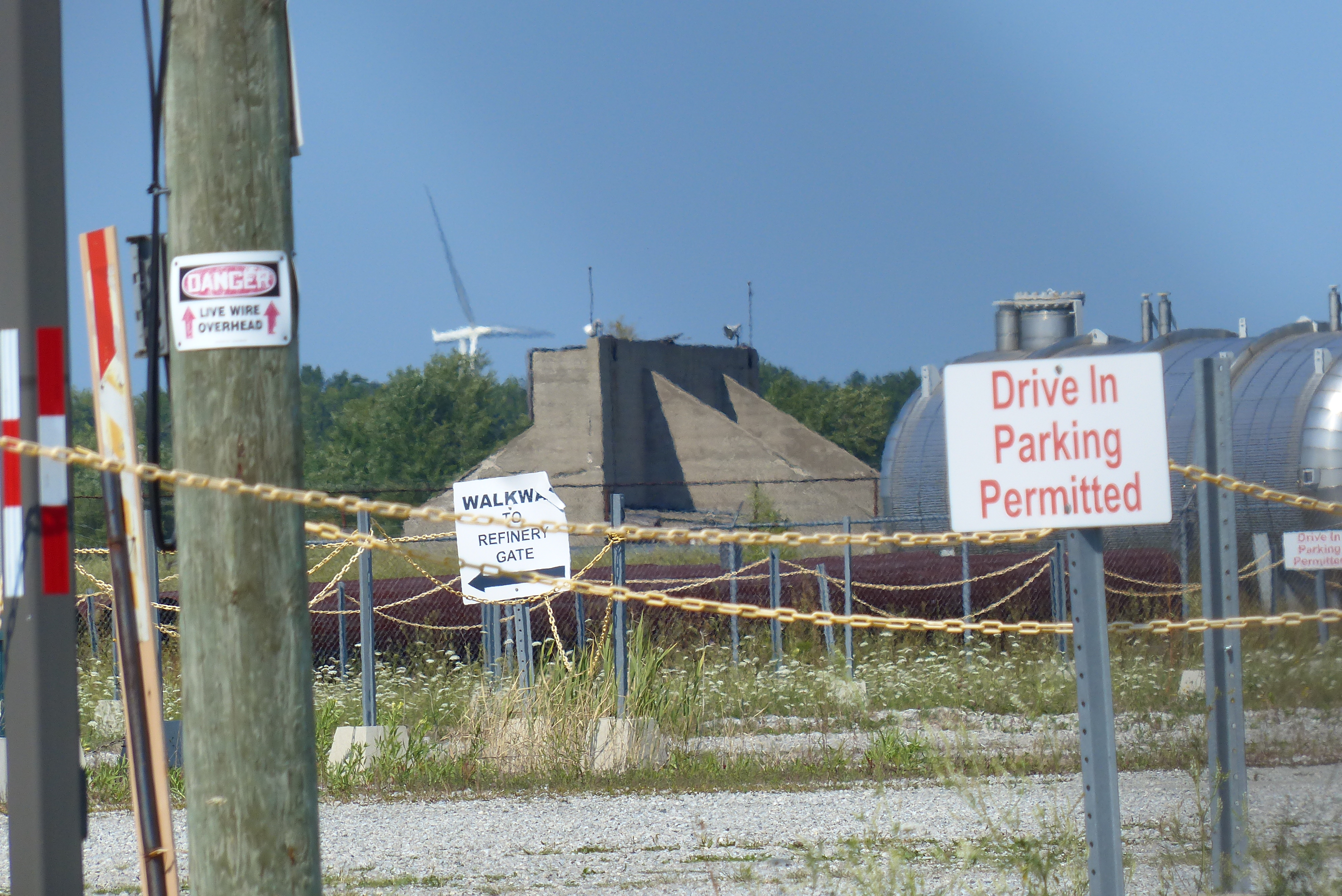
Concrete stop for 25 yard gunnery range

== See also ==
- Flags of Canada
- RCAF Air Gunner Andrew Mynarski, VC
- Canadian Warplane Heritage Museum
- RCAF Station Guelph
- No. 6 Group RCAF
- Commonwealth War Graves Commission
