= RCAF Station Guelph =

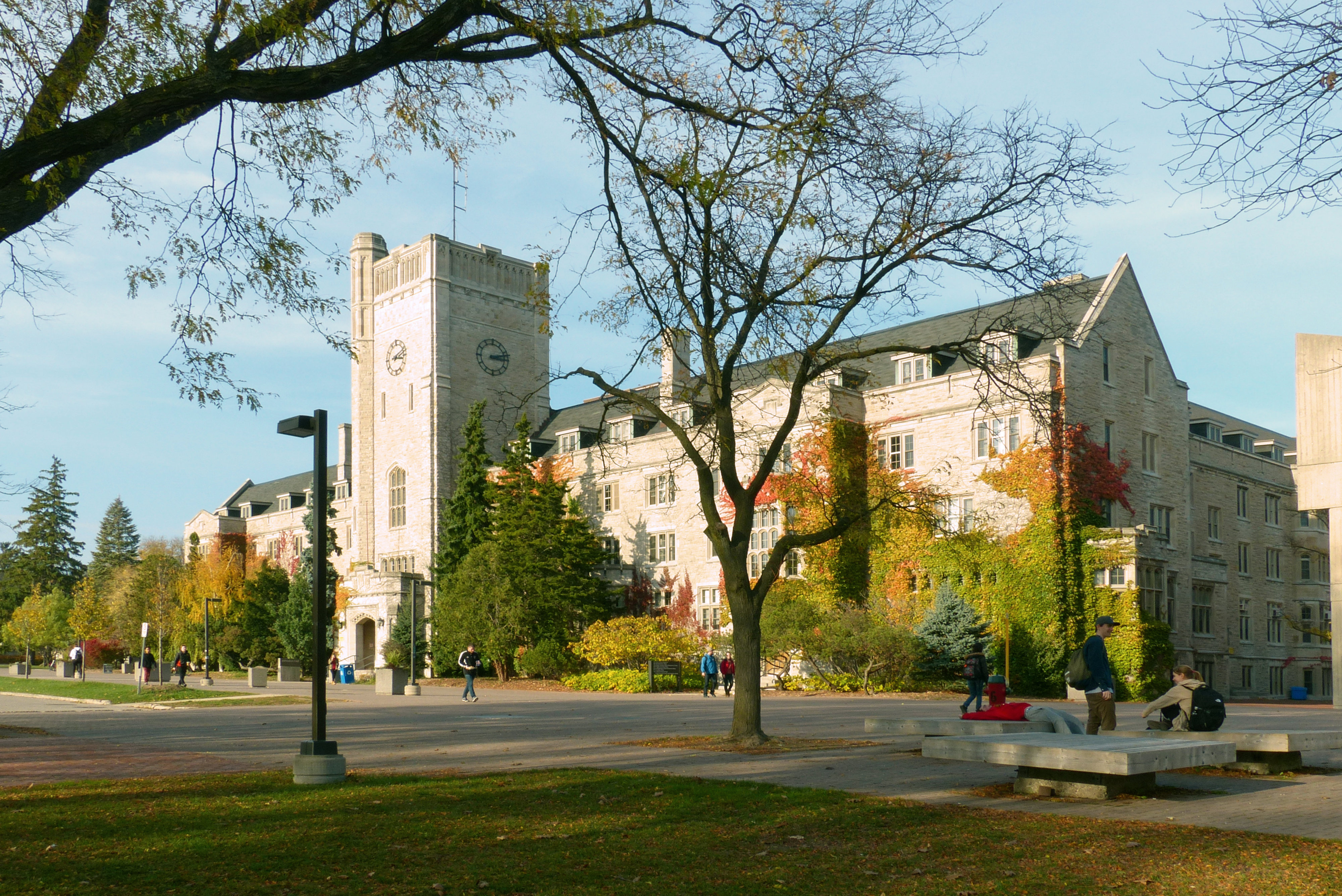
- Johnston Hall, University of Guelph. In 1941 this building was station HQ.
- Active: 7 July 1941 – 12 January 1945
- Country: Canada
- Branch: Royal Canadian Air Force
- Role: British Commonwealth Air Training Plan; Aircrew and groundcrew training
- Part of: No. 1 Training Command
- Testing: No. 1 Nutritional Laboratory; No. 1 Test Kitchen Unit
- Schools: No. 4 Wireless School; RCAF School of Cookery; No. 15 RCAF Detachment [Radio Mechanics School] No. 1 Code and Cypher School; No. 15 Pre-Aircrew Education Detachment
- Station Magazine: Sparks

Commanders
- G/C: A. H. Keith Russell - June 1941
- G/C: D. G. Williams - May 1943
- W/C: J. H. Roberts - May 1944
- W/C: D. J. R. Cairns - October 1944

Aircraft flown
- Trainer: De Havilland Menasco Moth; Noorduyn Norseman; North American Yale; North American Harvard

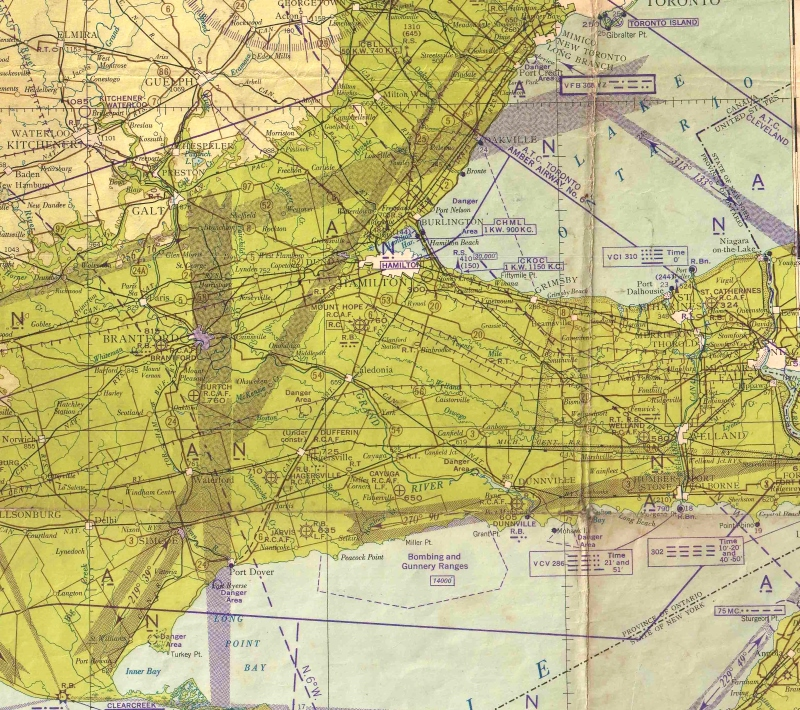
The locale of No. 4 Wireless School

RCAF Station Guelph was a Second World War British Commonwealth Air Training Plan (BCATP) station located in Guelph, Ontario on the campus of the Ontario Agricultural College (OAC), the Ontario Veterinary College (OVC), and the Macdonald Institute. The station is usually known as No. 4 Wireless School (Note: The standard short form is No. 4 W.S., but it is also shortened as No. 4 WS or 4 WS.) and was home to several schools as well as test facilities for air force kitchens.

The relationship between the Royal Canadian Air Force and the OAC began in January 1940 when the air force began to send airmen to the OAC to be trained as chefs. This instruction was provided on a contract basis, and the OAC remained under the control of the Province of Ontario. In May 1941, the RCAF (Note: RCAF is the standard short form for Royal Canadian Air Force. also shortened as R.C.A.F.) took control of a large portion of the campus, and by July 1941 a standard RCAF air station was operating there with headquarters in Johnston Hall.

The largest school was the Wireless School, which trained airmen to be Wireless Operators. Many moved on to Bombing and Gunnery School to qualify as Wireless Air Gunners. These airmen served as aircrew on large Commonwealth aircraft in RAF Bomber Command, perhaps in No. 6 Group RCAF, RAF Coastal Command, and RAF Ferry Command. Those posted to Home Defence in Canada served in RCAF Eastern Air Command or RCAF Western Air Command. This list is not exhaustive. Some airwomen trained as Wireless Operators, Ground.

The second-largest school was the School of Cookery, which trained airmen and airwomen as chefs at air stations.

The British Commonwealth Air Training Plan was a temporary wartime measure scheduled to end on 29 March 1945. In March 1944, Air Minister Power announced that No. 4 Wireless School would close on 29 December 1944. The school actually closed on 12 January 1945, when an air force transition team took over, and on 22 February 1945 the RCAF formally withdrew and returned the campus to the OAC.

At least 8,000 airmen and airwomen were trained at RCAF Station Guelph. (Note: This number is problematic. It does not include trainees who attended No. 15 Pre-Aircrew Education Detachment, which is not described in the article. The number of Wireless Air Gunner trainees is given in two places. From the records in the Operations Record Book, a count of 4,000 can be derived. On the other hand, there is a typewritten note in the McLaughlin Archives, authored by Victor Nielsen, a WAG who trained at No. 4, saying that 5,800 WAGs were trained here.)

== Controversial beginning ==
The establishment of the station caused a political controversy that was widely reported on in the Toronto and Guelph daily newspapers, and farm publications in Ontario. On 28 February 1941, the Premier of Ontario, Mr. Mitchell Hepburn, announced the gift of OAC to the federal government for the war effort. The City of Guelph, many farm groups, and others opposed this gift. These people did not want the Ontario Agriculture College closed down, and Mr. George Drew, the leader of the Opposition in the Legislative Assembly of Ontario, took up their cause. A debate ensued and on 7 March 1941 the legislature voted for a compromise that would keep the OAC open for classes while permitting the RCAF to use the campus for No. 4 Wireless School. The RCAF would get the dormitories and instructors it wanted and the OAC and OVC could continue, although their students would have to live off-campus. Classes at the Macdonald Institute were completely cancelled. It was left to the people of Guelph to make this compromise work.

Construction began around 10 May 1941, and by 26 June 1941 100 Guelph men were working on the site. Building interiors were modified, a guardhouse was built on MacDonald St. near Gordon St., an Armaments building (25 yard shooting range) was erected on MacDonald St., and a barbed wire fence enclosed the RCAF portion of the campus. Eventually facilities for 1,500 RCAF personnel were made and included police and fire services, motor transport, hospital and post office. This is roughly the same size as most of the air stations built in Canada between 1940 and 1943.

The advance party of RCAF officers arrived on 7 June 1941 under the command of Wing Commander (W/C) A. H. K. Russell.

== No. 4 Wireless School opens ==
The first class of airmen began wireless studies on 7 July 1941. They numbered 200, including three Australians and one member of the Royal Air Force.

W/C Russell explained the operation of the school in an interview with the Toronto Daily Star. "During this period the men will receive lectures in mathematics, radio theory, hygiene, first aid, law and administration, armament, anti-gas work, signalling code and procedure, visual signalling with lamps and flags. They will also have a part of their time taken up with drill and games," he said. Russell neglected to mention topics like aircraft identification, aircraft radio equipment used by the RAF and RCAF, radio troubleshooting and repair, and that students were expected to learn skeet shooting, how to swim and how to right a capsized dinghy. The most important wireless signalling skill was proficiency in Morse Code; the airmen were expected to send and receive at 18 words per minute.

The day began with physical training, and they were also expected to perform duties such as cleaning dormitories and moving heating coal about the campus.

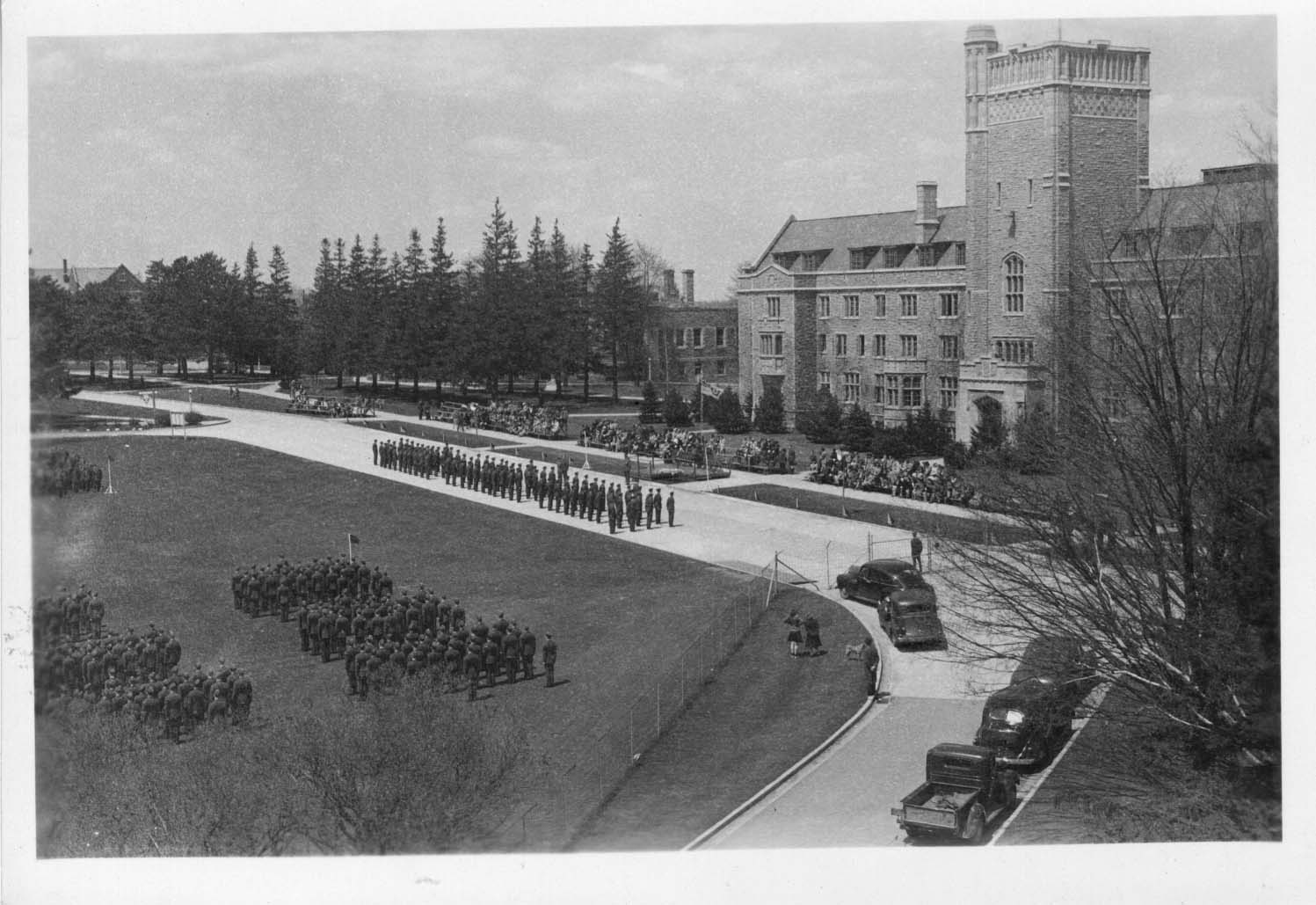
The official opening Saturday 9 August 1941

The official opening took place on Saturday, 9 August 1941. Air Commodore G. E. Brooks, O.B.E., Air Officer Commanding No. 1 Training Command, was the senior RCAF officer present. He inspected the school and the airmen. Other RCAF officers attended including the commanders of No. 5 SFTS Brantford, No. 6 SFTS Dunnville, and No. 14 SFTS Aylmer. (Note: SFTS is the standard short form for Service Flying Training School. also shortened as S.F.T.S.) Civilian dignitaries present were the Hon. P. M. Dewan, Ontario Minister of Agriculture, Lt-Col. George Drew, K.C., Ontario Conservative Leader, His Worship Mayor William G. Taylor of Guelph, Dr. G. I. Christie, president of the Ontario Agricultural College, and R. W. Gladstone, M.P., South Wellington.

Hundreds of members of the public toured the dormitories, hospital and kitchens, and watched demonstrations of wireless signalling, first aid, and cooking.

By the time of the official opening the station strength stood at 900 airmen.

=== Wireless aircrew training process ===
The training process for Wireless Operators and Wireless Air Gunners was divided into sections and could last as long as 45 weeks. In November 1942 the process was:

- Manning Depot - 5 weeks
- Tarmac Duty - 4–8 weeks
- Wireless School - 28 weeks (Wireless Operator) (Note: originally 18-20 weeks)
- Bombing and Gunnery School - 4 weeks (Wireless Air Gunner)

Near the end of Wireless School trainees (Note: trainee is the term used by the air force in the 1940s to refer to their recruits) moved out of the classroom and began to practise signalling in aircraft. This phase lasted several weeks and consisted of message transmission, signalling, and direction finding (DF) during local and cross-country flights. After 30 or so hours in the air, most of them in daylight, training was complete.

In spite of the best efforts of some people in Kitchener and Wellington County, no airfield was built for No. 4 WS. For several years trainees used the RCAF airfield at Burtch 43°03′08″N 080°16′29″W for their airborne practice. (Note: Burtch was the relief airfield for No. 5 Service Flying Training School, Brantford. By 2013, this airfield had been restored to farmland.) In the beginning, they were bussed from Guelph to Burtch on a daily basis, but some time later a permanent camp was built there.

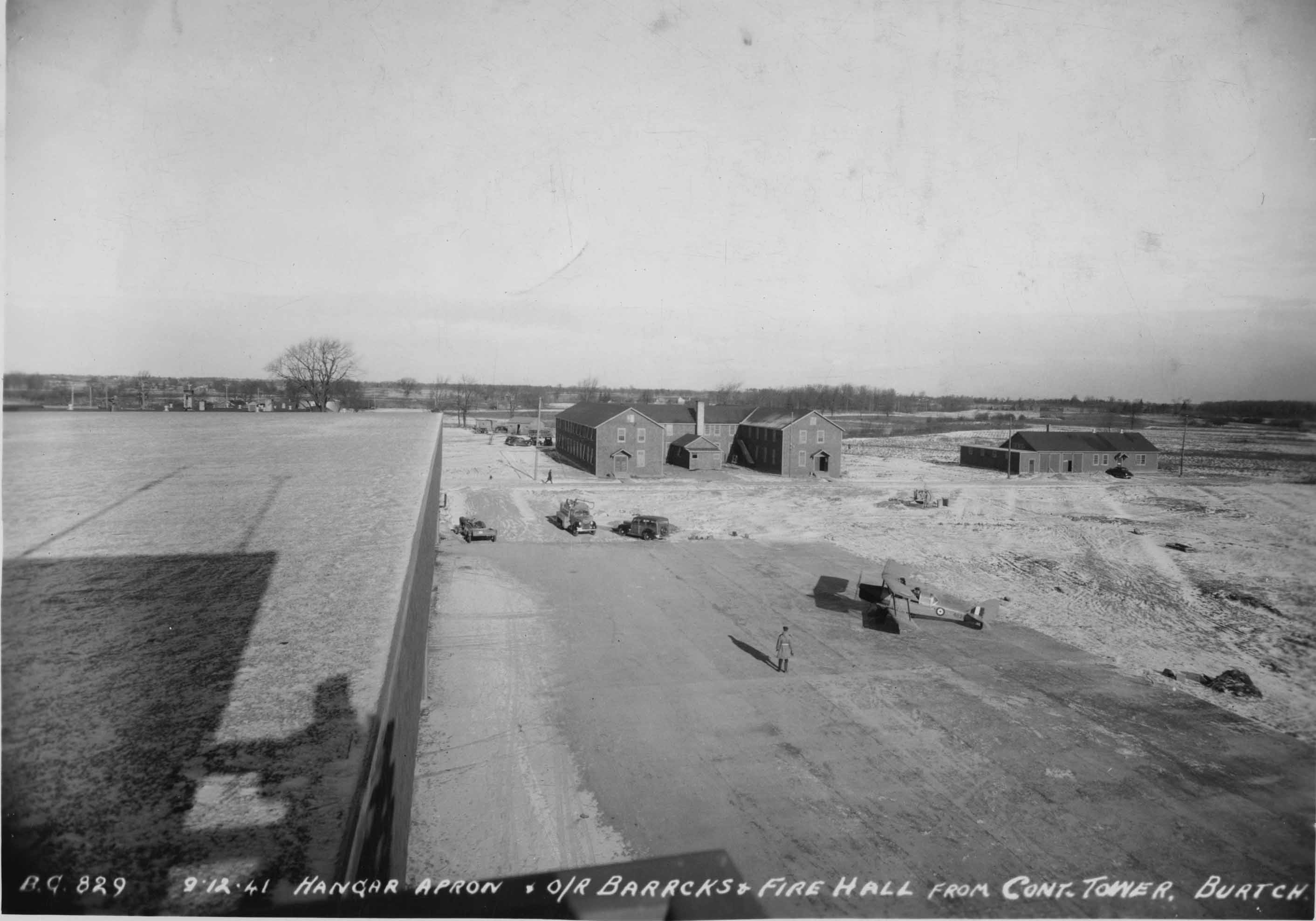
Tiger Moth 4896 on the apron at RCAF Burtch 9 December 1941

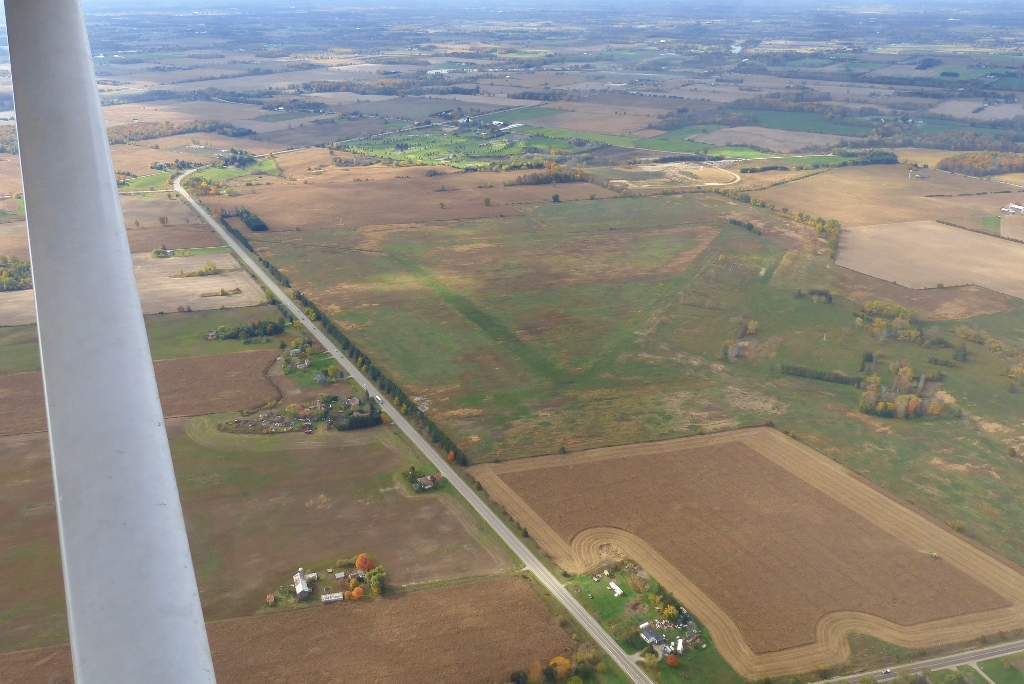
RCAF Burtch in 2016

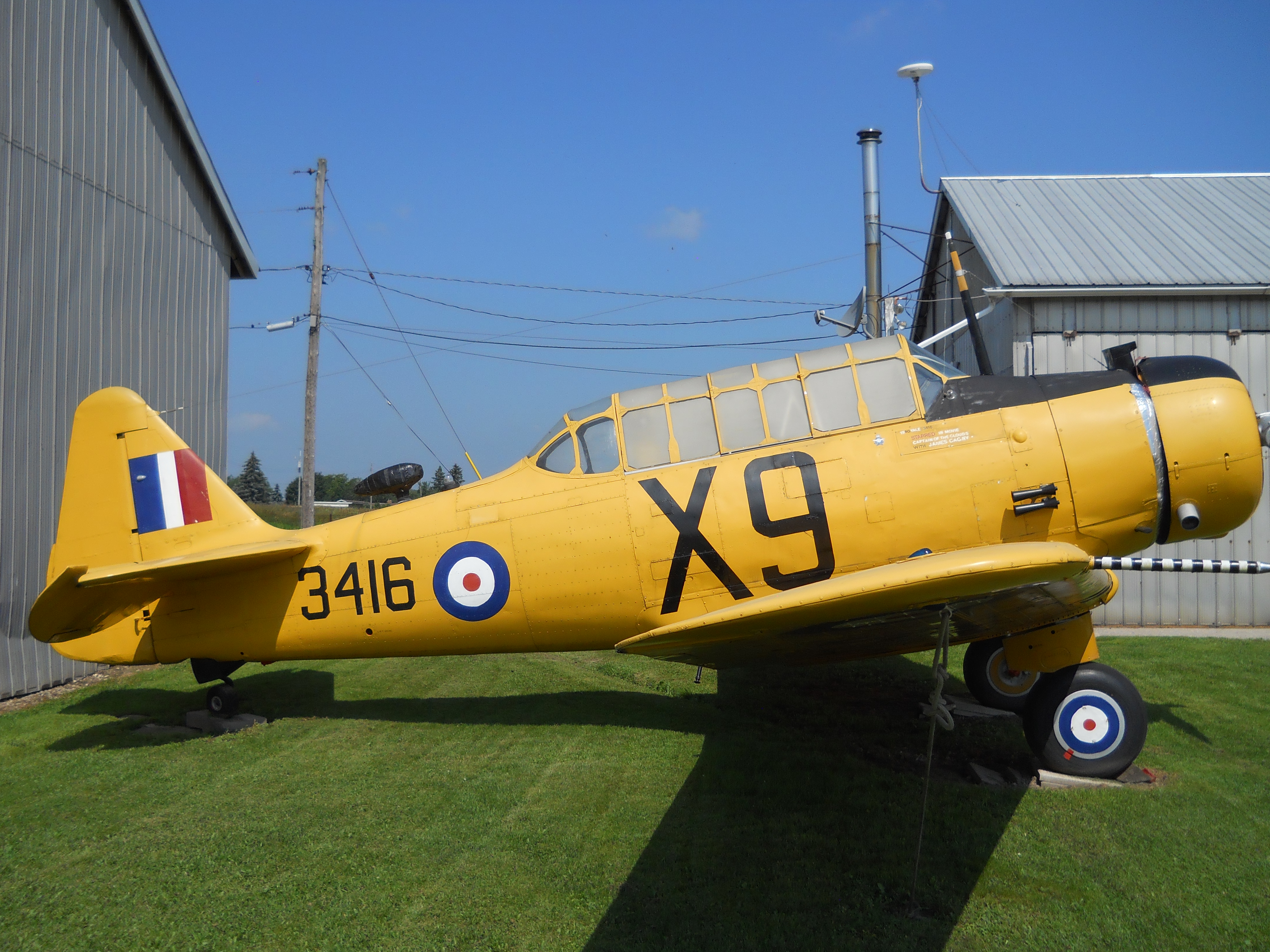
Yale (W/T) Wireless Trainer from No. 4 WS

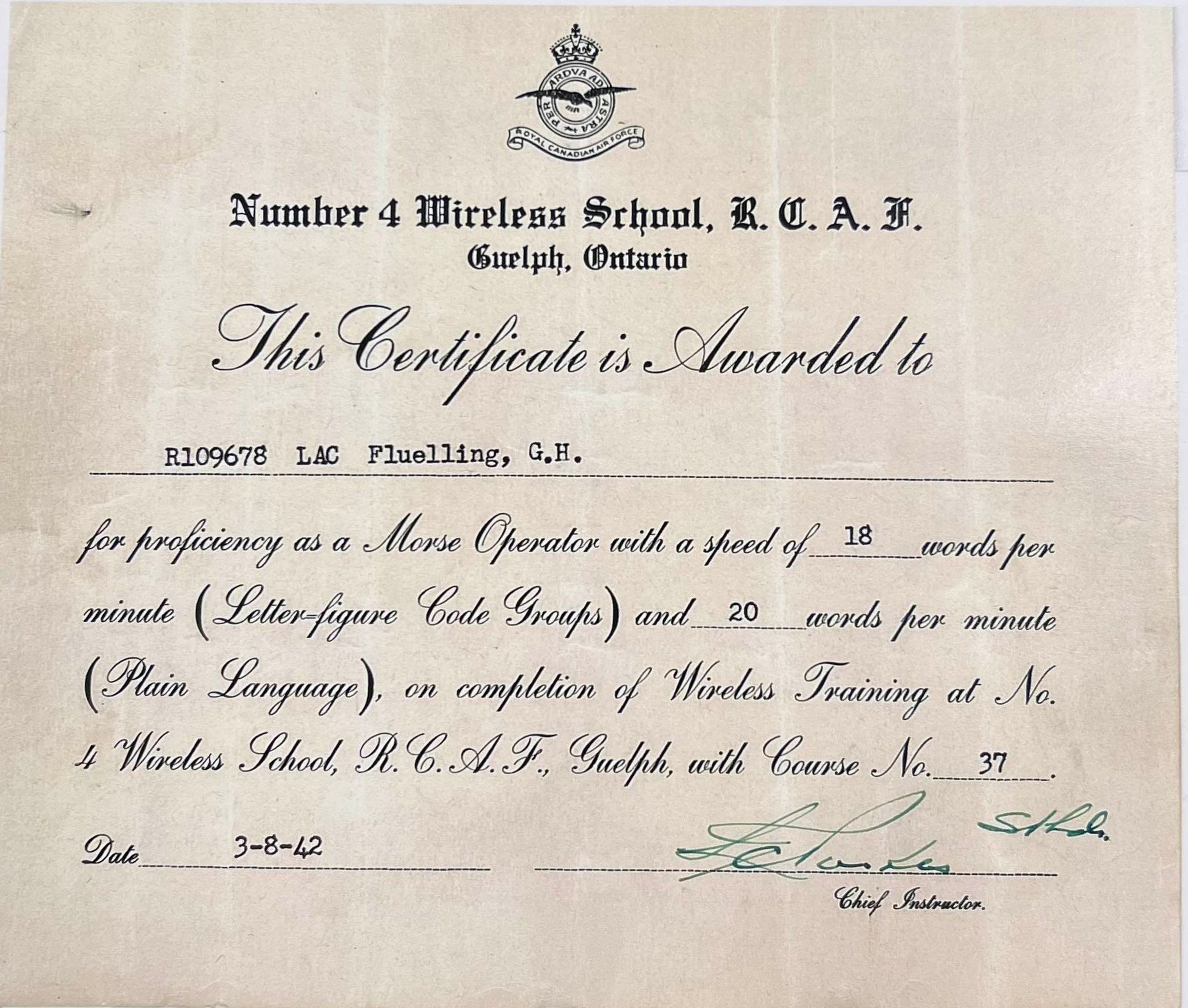
RCAF Certificate of Wireless Competency, No. 4 WS, 1942

In 1944, airborne training was moved to the RCAF airfield at St. Catharines, Ontario.

=== First graduates ===
The first class of Wireless Operators left No. 4 Wireless School and were enrolled at No. 1 Bombing and Gunnery School. On 20 December 1941, they received their wings in a ceremony held in Hangar F at No. 1 B&GS. W/C Russell, Commanding Officer of No. 4 WS was invited to officiate at this ceremony.

=== Wireless trainees and their service ===
George Sydney Smith, the Air Gunner, 1942 (oil on canvas)

Volunteer airmen and airwomen arrived at No. 4 WS from many lands including Canada, Newfoundland, Britain, Australia, New Zealand, South Africa, Trinidad, Bermuda, the Bahamas, and the United States. They trained to be Wireless Operators (WOPs), and most moved on to Bombing & Gunnery School (B&GS) where they qualified as Wireless Air Gunners (WAGs). Some of the top trainees in each class elected to become Navigators and moved on to Air Observer School (AOS). Other top trainees were asked to become instructors. A few trainees became Wireless Operators, Ground (WOGs). (Note: Many of the Canadian volunteers were 17-20 years old and came from farms.)

By the time the school closed, between 5,000 and 5,800 wireless operators had passed through its doors and of these, well over 1,000 died in service.

No. 4's most distinguished trainee may be the Honourable Lincoln Alexander, who graduated as a Wireless Operator, Ground and then became an instructor. On the occasion of the 50th anniversary of No. 4 WS, he said, "I remember the friendship and the fun. It made me a man. It taught me what authority was all about. It taught me to respect others. I'm proud of my service."

Example: the crew of Canso 9816

No. 162 Squadron RCAF operated Canso aircraft on anti-submarine patrols from various locations including RAF Wick, Scotland. A Canso's crew of eight airmen included three WAGs. On 13 June 1944, Canso 9816 attacked and sank U-boat [U-715] 200 miles north of the Shetland Islands. The Canso was damaged during the attack, made a forced landing on the sea and was abandoned by the crew. They were rescued by flying boat eight hours after the forced landing, but three of their number perished before help arrived. The crew of Canso 9816 that day was:

- Wing Commander (W/C) Cecil G. W. "Bill" Chapman (pilot, skipper, squadron commanding officer (CO))
- Flying Officer (F/O) James M. McCrae (co-pilot)
- Flying Officer (F/O) Dave J. Waterbury (navigator)
- Warrant Officer 2 (WO2) Joseph J. C. Bergevin (wireless air gunner-wireless operator)
- Warrant Officer 2 (WO2) Frank K. Reed (wireless air gunner)
- Flight Sergeant (FSgt) Harry C. Leatherdale (flight engineer)
- Flight Sergeant (FSgt) Gerald F. Staples (wireless air gunner)
- Sergeant (Sgt) Robert F. Cromarty (flight engineer)

Reed, Leatherdale, and Staples died before rescue. Bergevin, Cromarty, and McCrae were decorated for this action.

== RCAF School of Cookery ==
The RCAF began sending airmen to the OAC in January 1940 to be trained as chefs. (Note: The OAC also trained chefs for the Canadian Army.) The class size was 18, and the course lasted 4 or 5 weeks, with Professor Hugh D. Branion and Miss Jesse Lambden of the OAC in charge. In October 1940, the class size was enlarged to 36, with a new group arriving every 3 weeks, and the course was lengthened to 6 weeks. The standard training process for an air force chef was:

- No. 1 Manning Depot - 3 weeks drill, inoculation, etc.
- No. 1 Manning Depot - kitchens for 1 to 2 weeks
- Guelph School of Cookery - 6 weeks
- No. 1 Manning depot kitchens - 2 weeks

The school also offered other courses like an 8-week course for Chef Hospital.
The purpose of the school was to provide people who were skilled in preparing highly nutritious meals, making efficient use of rations, and who understood the RCAF diet. With the establishment of the air station in July 1941, the chefs courses became part of No. 4 Wireless School as the School of Cookery. The class size was increased to 100. At the same time Professor Branion joined the RCAF and became Flight Lieutenant (F/L) Branion, Officer Commanding.
Graduates were posted to the training centres in Canada and other air stations.
Most of the instructors were civilians formerly on the staff of the OAC and the Macdonald Institute, and many of them were women. The School of Cookery operated from 2 January 1940 until 29 August 1944 and during that time 2,000 chefs were trained. Nearly all of the graduates were women.

== No. 1 Nutritional Laboratory ==
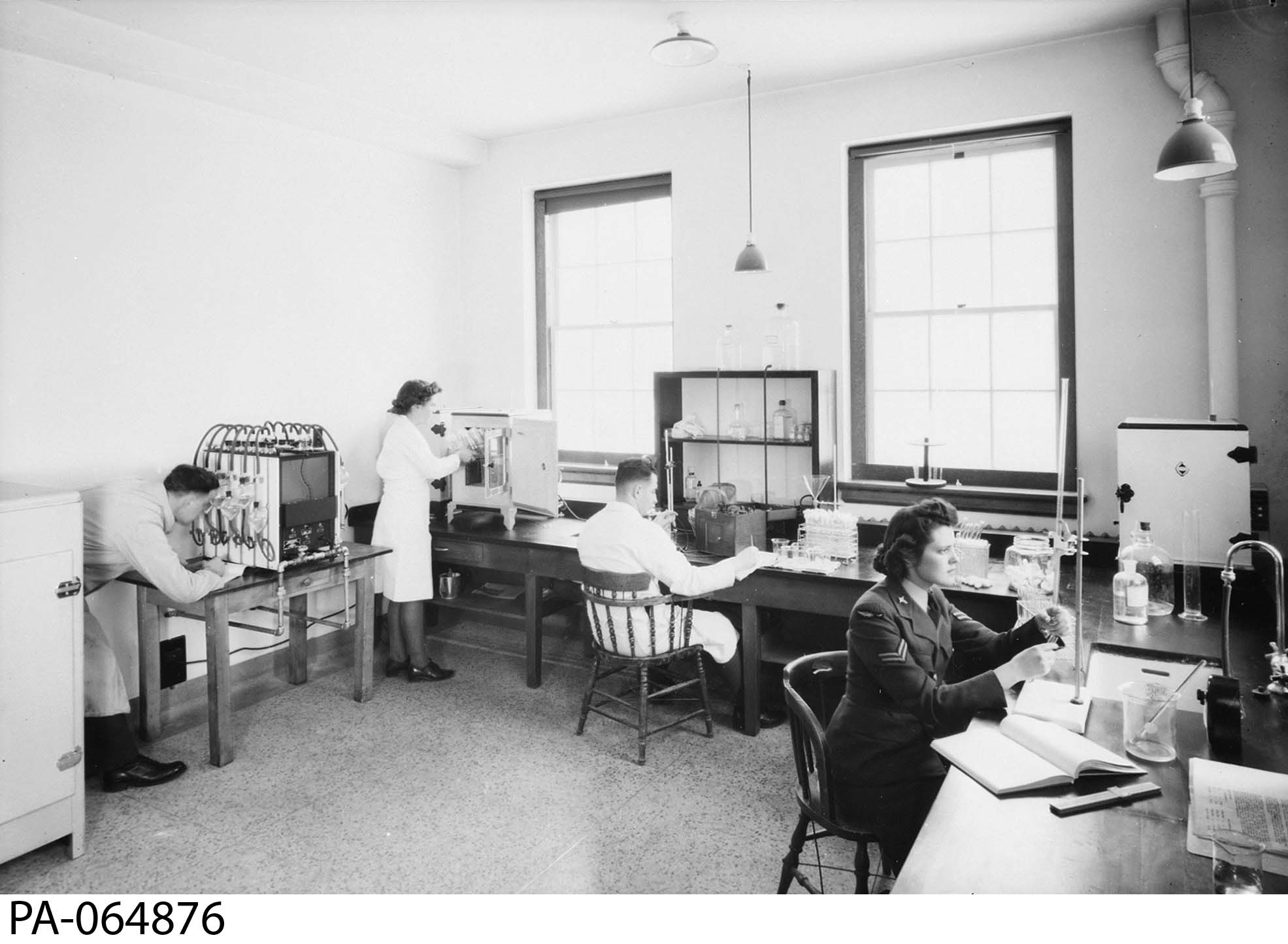
Testing Food Samples at No. 1 in 1944

The No. 1 Nutritional Laboratory was established in February 1943 with F/L Hugh Branion as Officer Commanding. It was part of the medical branch of the Royal Canadian Air Force. The lab tested food samples from all RCAF stations in Ontario, and some in Quebec, to ensure that the kitchens at these stations prepared food correctly. Periodically, laboratory staff travelled to the stations and inspected their kitchens.

== No. 1 Test Kitchen ==
The No. 1 Test Kitchen was also established in February 1943. New recipes were developed in the Test Kitchen before they were used at the other air stations. A typical development cycle lasted 10 weeks. The Test Kitchen was located in Creelman Hall.

== No. 15 RCAF Detachment - Radio Mechanics School ==
"Radio Mechanic" was a term used in 1940 to describe a "radar technician". In 1940, the term "radar" had not been coined, and the British referred to radar as "Radio Direction Finding". Radar technology was a secret, strategic part of the air war. Thousands of technicians were required to install and maintain radar sets in aircraft and ground stations. The RCAF began sending airmen to the OAC in June 1941 for theoretical training in electronics, radio, and radar. The class size was 75, and the course lasted 13 weeks with Professor W. C. Blackwood of the Physics Department in charge. Trainees who passed the course went on to practical training either at No. 31 Range and Direction Finding School or at a similar establishment in the United Kingdom.

With the establishment of the air station in July 1941, the Radio Mechanics School became part of No. 4 Wireless School. All told, 581 radio mechanics were trained before the school closed in March 1943.

== Airwomen at the station - the "WDs" ==
In November 1941, the first RCAF airwomen arrived at Guelph. They were trainees at the School of Cookery. They trained in parallel with their colleagues at No. 6 Manning Depot in Toronto and on 2 January 1942 left for duty at RCAF Station Uplands. Over time, more trades were opened to airwomen, and some were enrolled in the Wireless section to be trained as Wireless Operators, Ground. A/V/M William Bishop's daughter AW2 Marise Bishop graduated from No. 4 Wireless School in September 1944. She was part of the last class of airwomen wireless operators trained by the RCAF in the Second World War.

A small number of airwomen trained as Code and Cypher Clerks at No. 1 Code and Cypher School at Guelph.

Airwomen also served as members of the station staff. They were housed at the adjacent Cutten Fields golf course.

== Recreation and downtown Guelph ==
The station provided many opportunities for the airmen to participate in sports. Teams were organized and entered in leagues. Hockey was an RCAF area sport. On one occasion some Australian airmen, who had never skated or played hockey before, challenged one of the best local hockey teams to a game. The No. 4 WS softball team won the area championship at least once. The soccer team played in the Guelph and District League with civilian teams. There was also a basketball team. Sports were also used solely for entertainment. On 10 August 1941, the Sunday Morning Girls softball team from Toronto visited the station to play the airmen's softball team.

The station maintained an entertainment centre in the basement of War Memorial Hall. The Royal Canadian Legion and the YWCA staffed the centre. They held dances here, including one featuring Canada's top dance band of the era, Mart Kenney and his Western Gentlemen. Airmen were encouraged to be resourceful and could be counted on to organize and perform in their own variety shows.

Sometimes the airmen could have fun in downtown Guelph. The King Edward Hotel, usually known as the "King Eddy", offered a bar with beer and a hall above with a juke box and dance floor. The auditorium on the second floor of Ryan's offered dancing to live music on Wednesdays and Fridays.

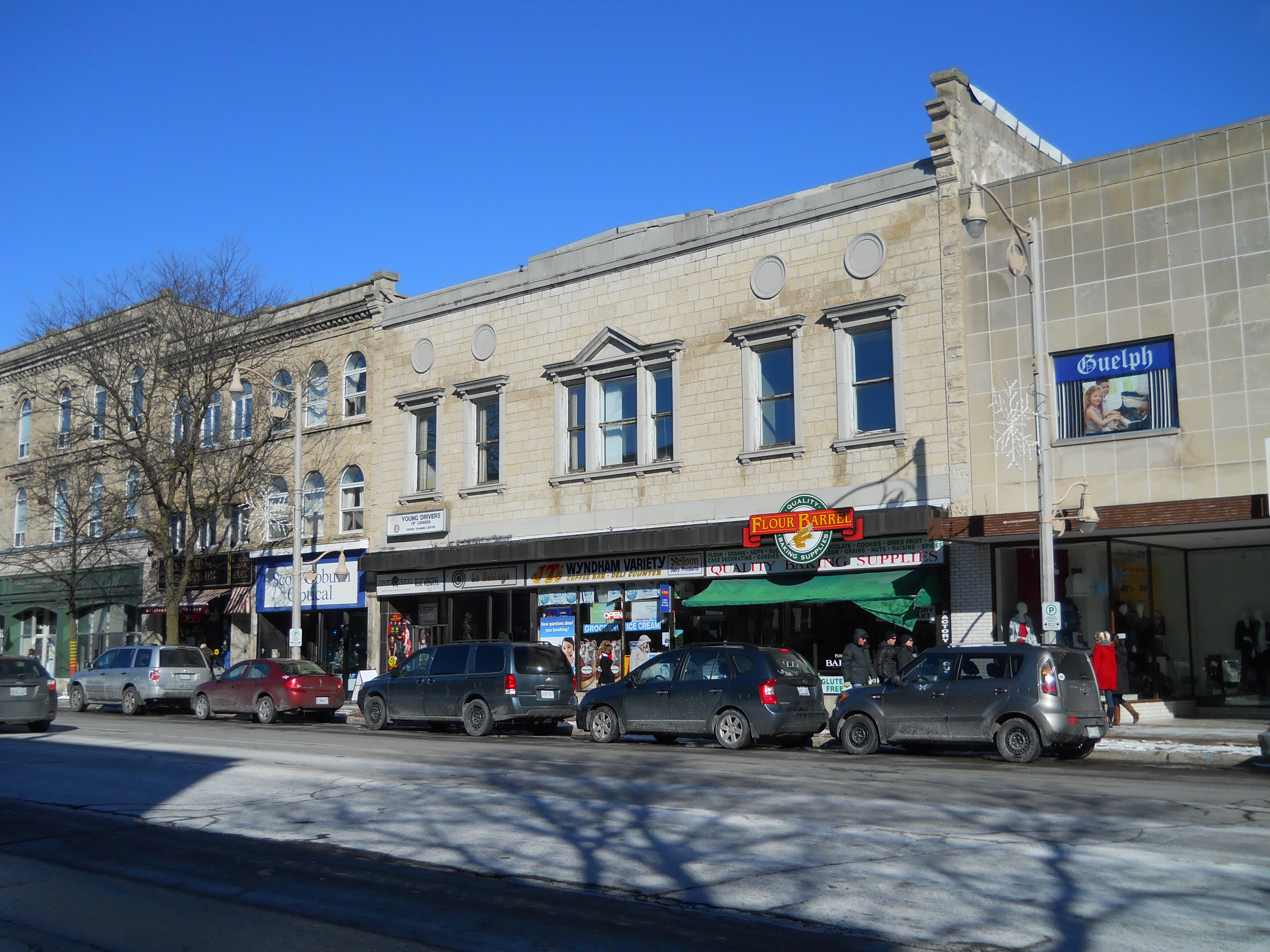
Ryan's, Downtown Guelph (dance hall)

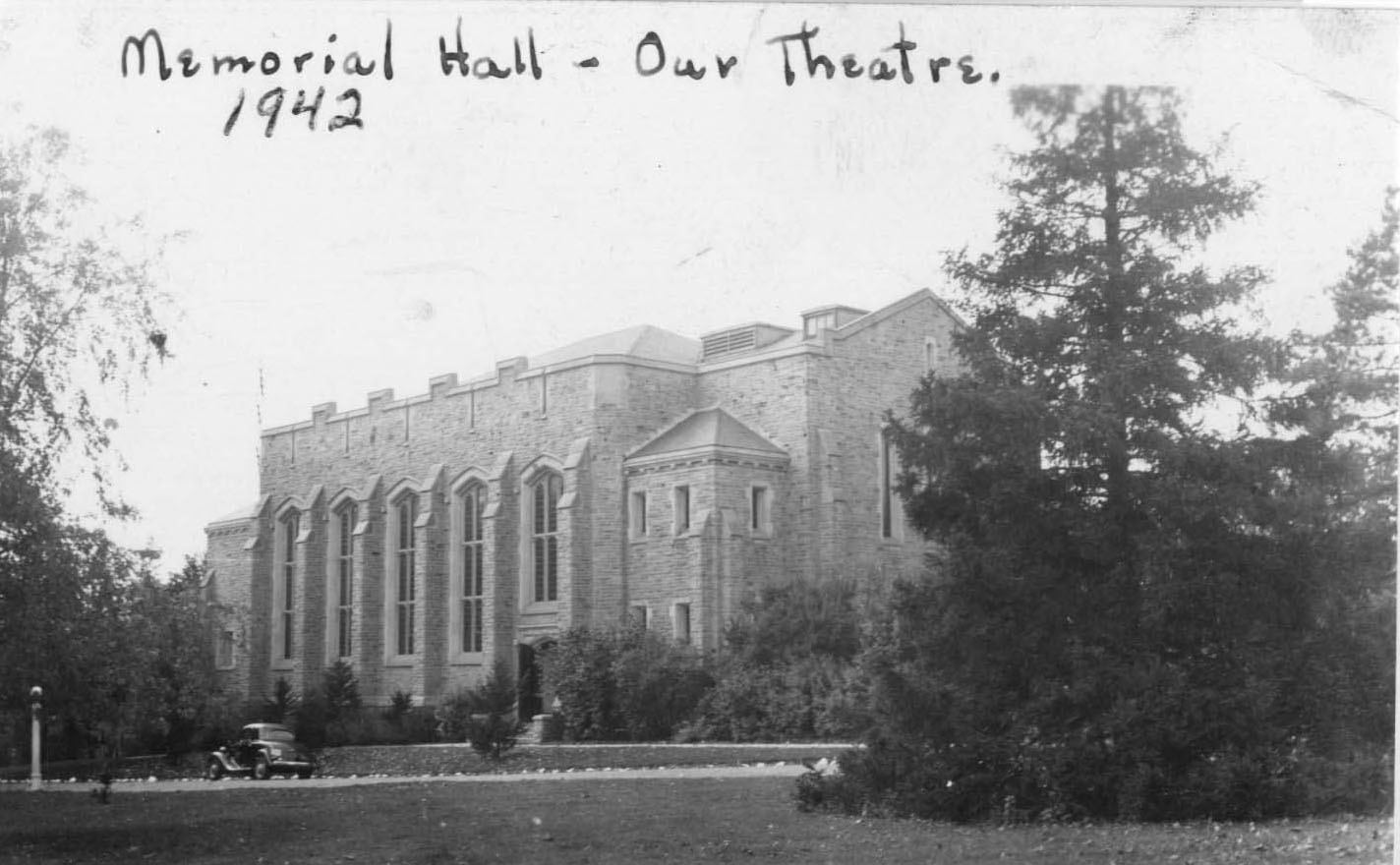
Entertainment Centre, No. 4 WS Compound

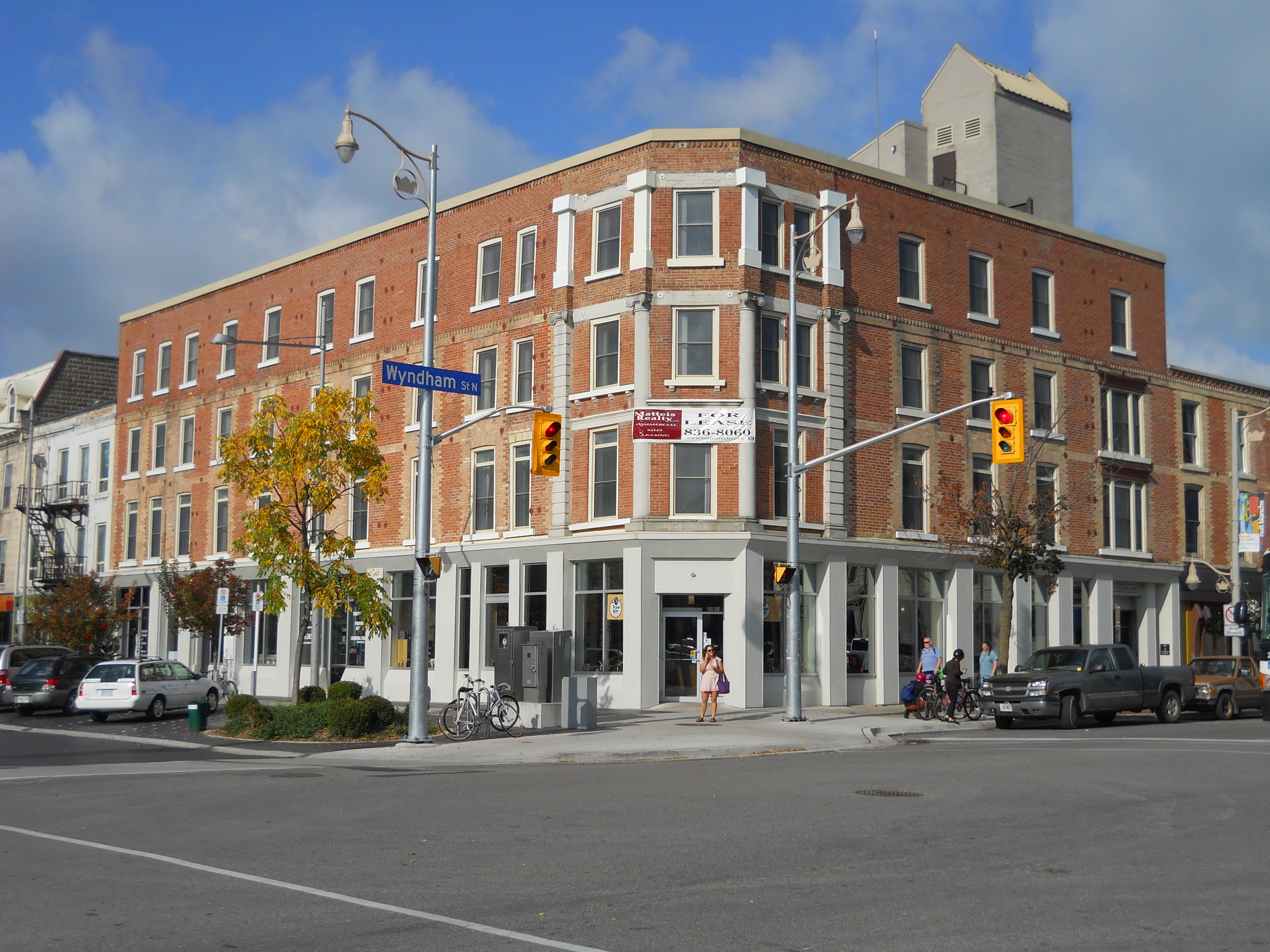
The King Eddy, Downtown Guelph (hotel, dance hall)

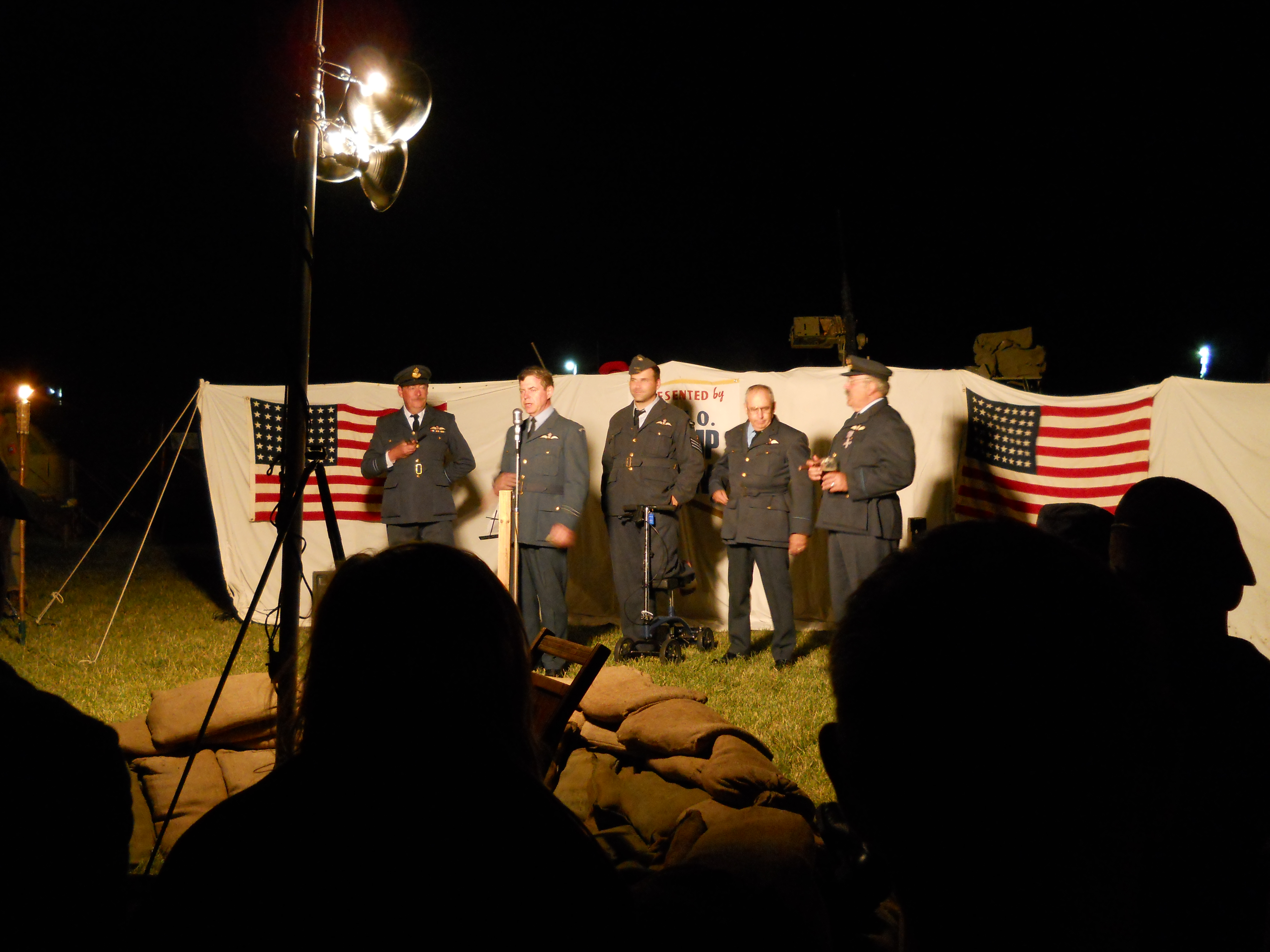
Airmen performing in a variety show (re-enactment)

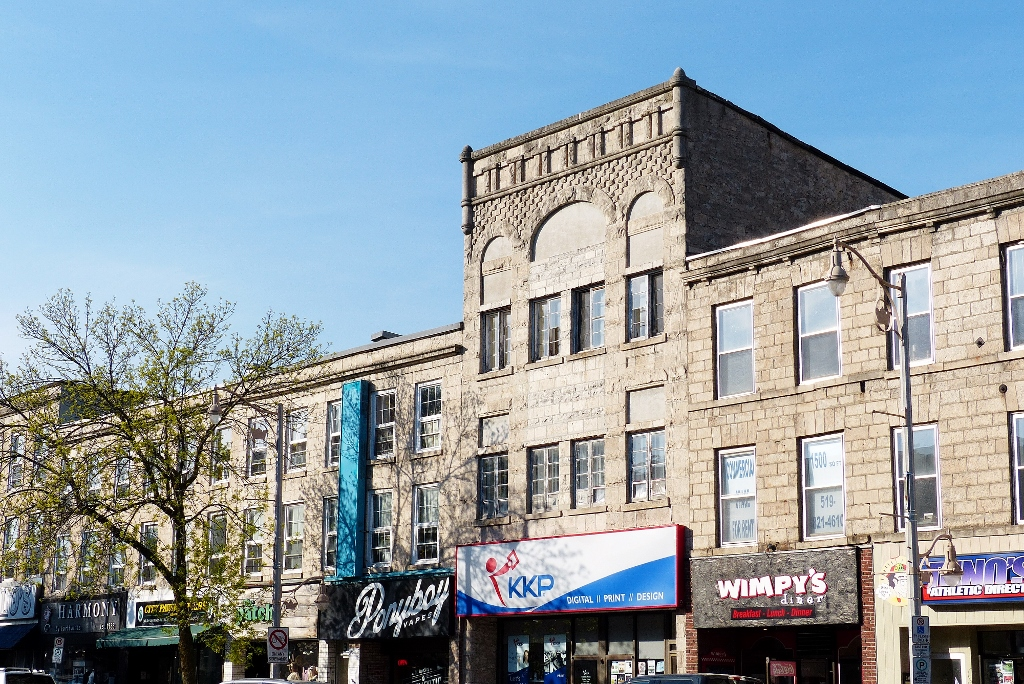
Active Service Canteen, Downtown Guelph

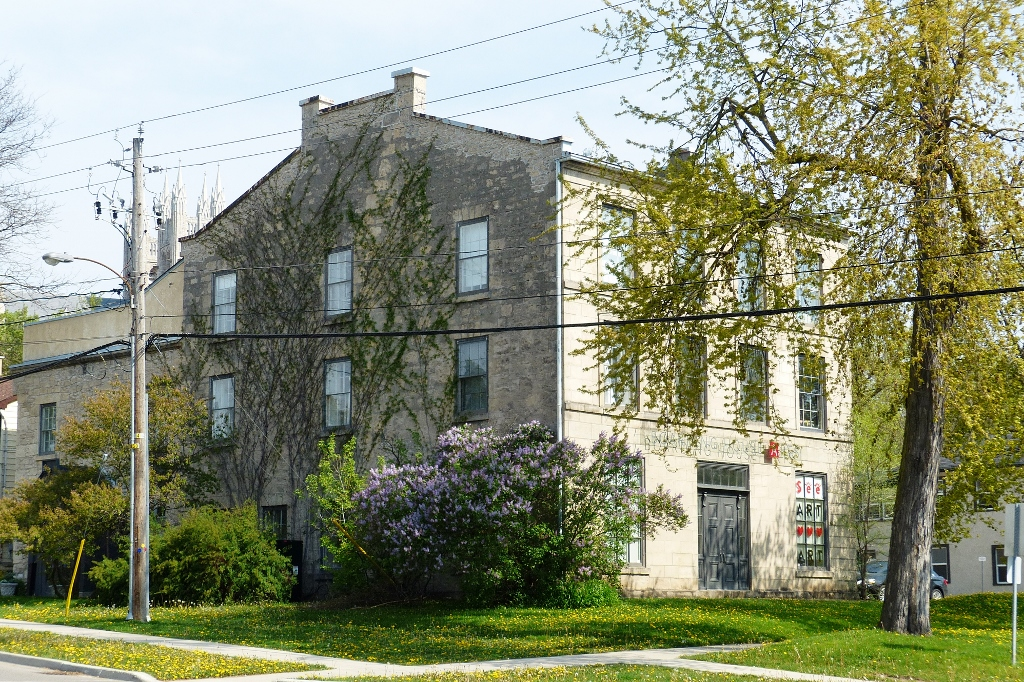
Knights of Columbus Comfort Centre

== Station buildings and sites ==
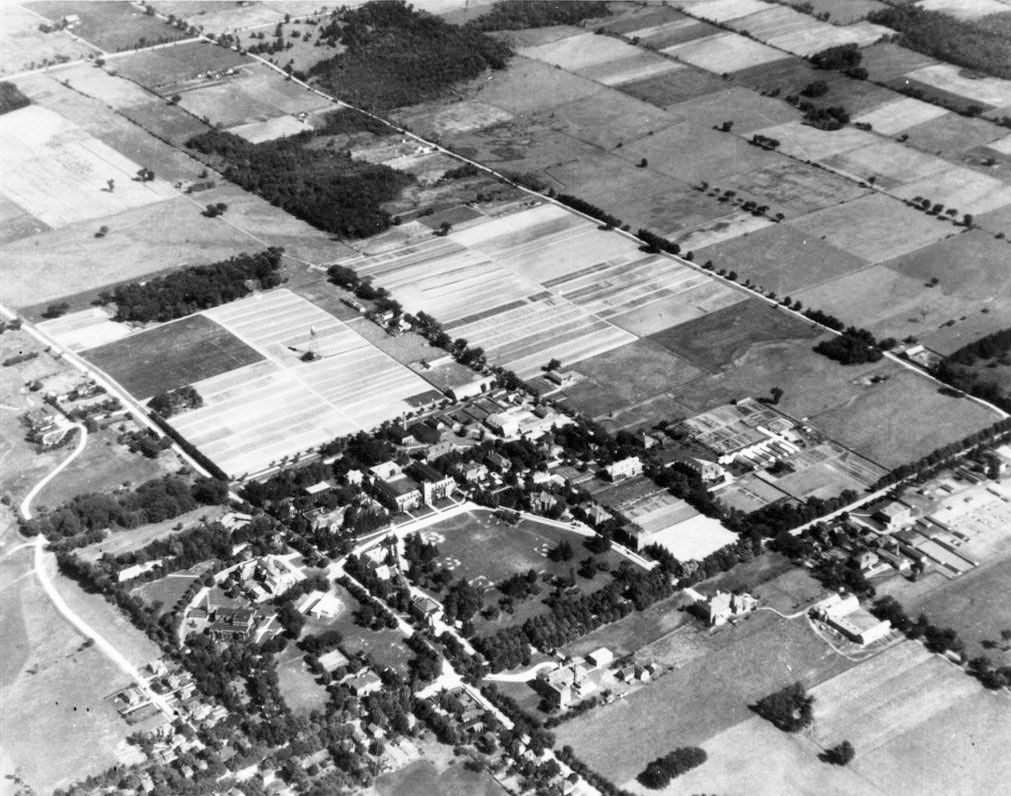
No. 4 Wireless School from the air, looking due east

The RCAF used most of buildings at the centre of the campus. They included Johnston Hall (headquarters, airmen's quarters and lounge, non-commissioned officers' quarters); Mills Hall (airmen's lounge and quarters); Creelman Hall (airmen's mess, No. 1 Test Kitchen Unit); Maid's Hall (non-commissioned officers' quarters and lounge); Watson Hall (male officers' quarters and mess); Macdonald Institute (classrooms); Macdonald Hall (airwomen's quarters); Macdonald Hall Annex (airwomen's laundry and lounge, female officers' quarters); Trent Institute (School of Cookery); Skating Rink (drill hall); Farm Mechanics Building (offices, laboratories, and equipment); Gymnasium Building (gymnasium); War Memorial Hall (auditorium and entertainment centre); Bursar Hall (fire and police service); and the Laundry (laundry).

In 2013, the Farm Mechanics Building is known as Blackwood Hall and Bursar Hall is called Drew Hall. The wartime gymnasium is gone, and the MacKinnon Building stands in its place. The wartime skating rink is part of the Athletic Centre.

The Cutten Fields golf club adjoins the campus of the OAC and its clubhouse was rented by the RCAF in 1941. The first floor of the clubhouse housed airwomen and the second floor housed female non-commissioned officers.

The RCAF added a few "temporary" buildings, such as the guardhouse and armaments building on Macdonald St., the garage on College Ave., and the barracks at the Cutten Fields. They made improvements to the sewage and water systems. The armaments building was used by the OAC and later by the University of Guelph and was known as the "Textiles and Design Building" until it was demolished around 2009. The barracks at the Cutten Fields was called the "Annex" and was used by the club until it was demolished around 1970.

In 2013, there are several reminders of RCAF Station Guelph on the University of Guelph campus:

- An inconspicuous plaque at the base of the Johnston Hall tower
- A plaque in front of the H. L. Hutt building
- Branion Plaza, named after Professor Hugh D. Branion, Head of the Department of Animal Nutrition and the RCAF School of Cookery 1939-1945
- Blackwood Hall, named after Professor W. C. Blackwood, Head of the Physics Department 1939-1945
- Christie Lane, named after Dr. G. I. Christie, President of the Ontario Agricultural College 1928–1947.

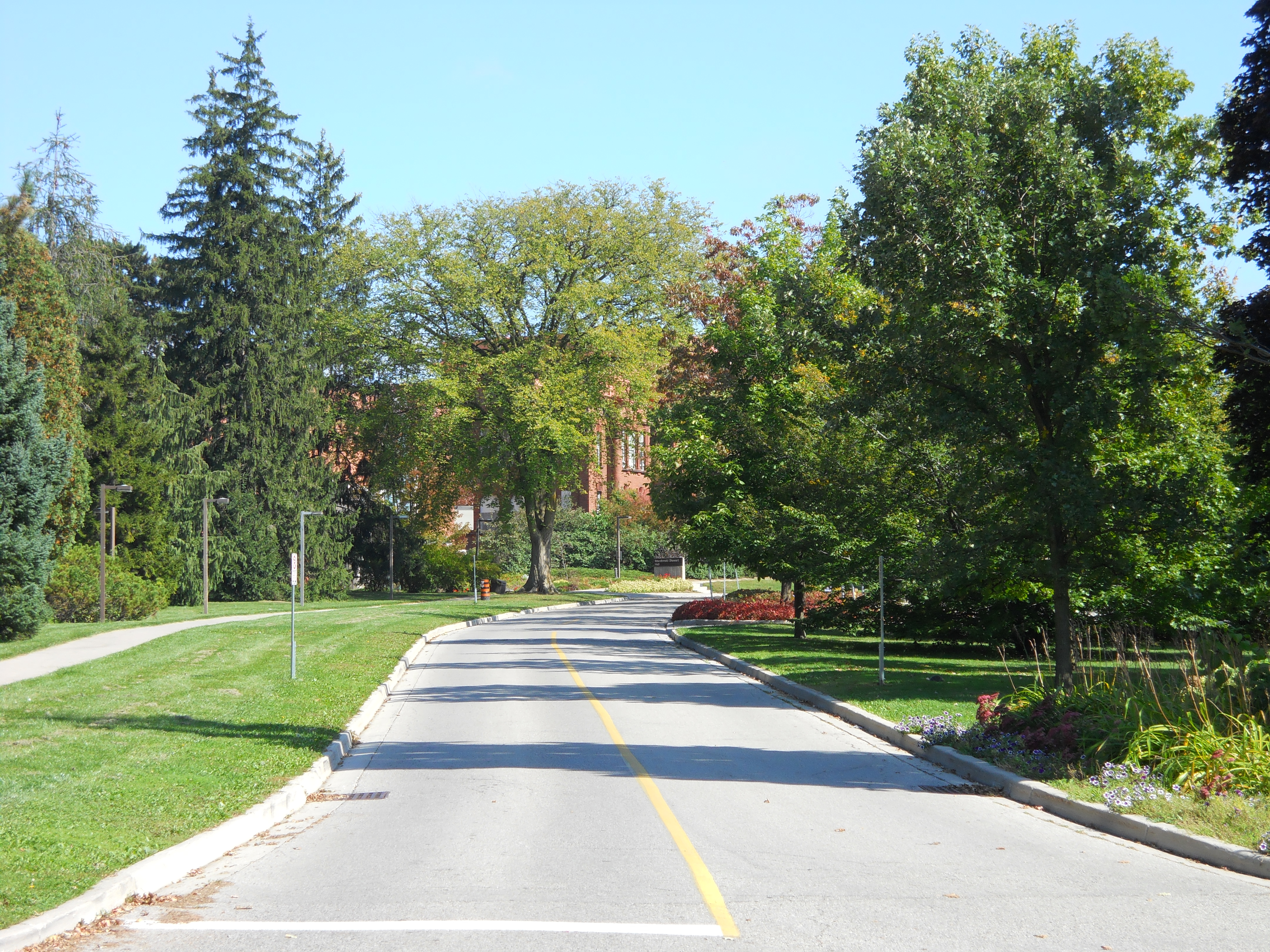
Macdonald St. from Gordon St. In 1941 the shadow was the main gate through the barbed wire security fence.

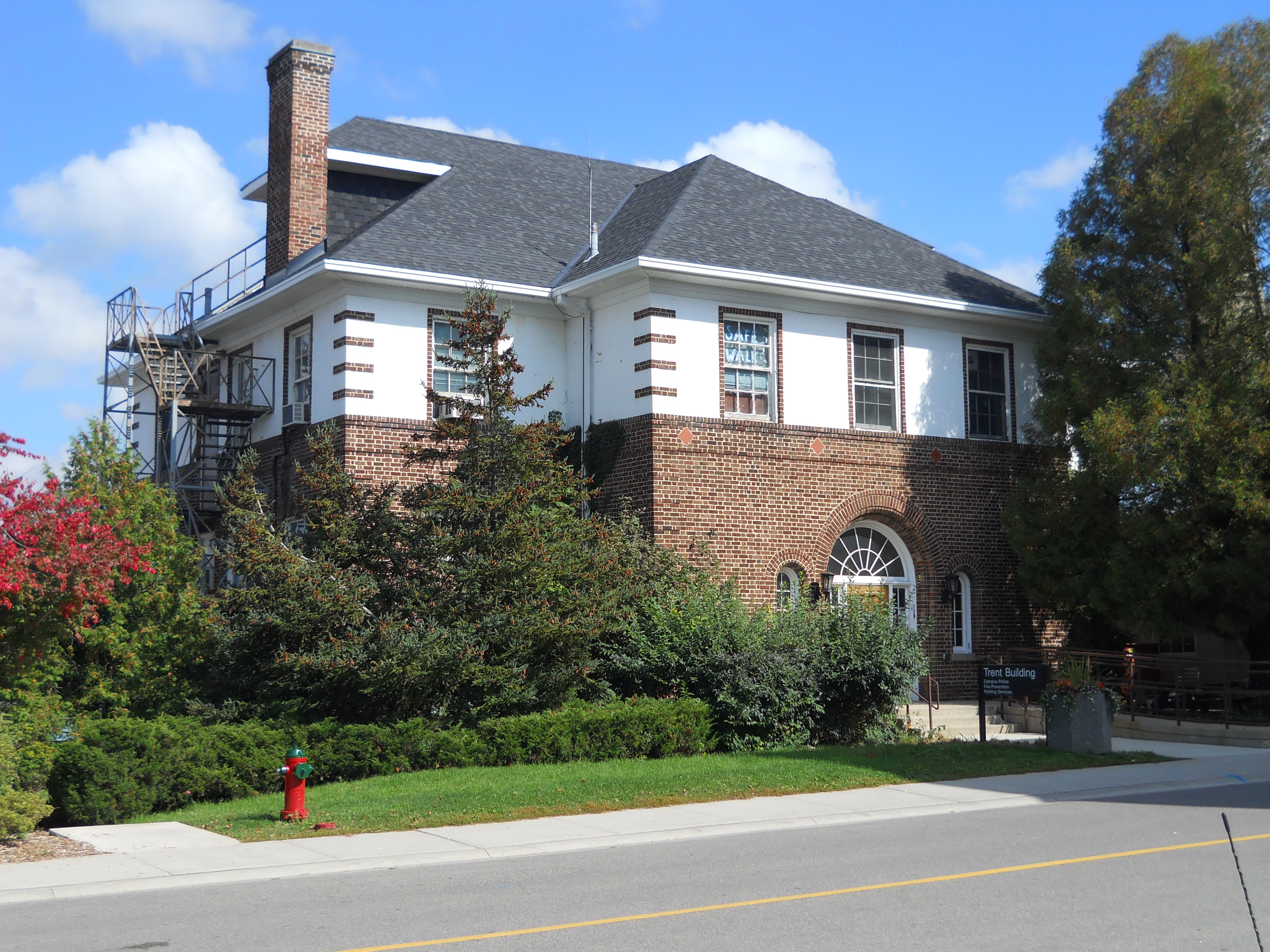
The Trent Institute Building on Trent Lane, home of the RCAF School of Cookery

The Armaments Building circa 2006, University of Guelph

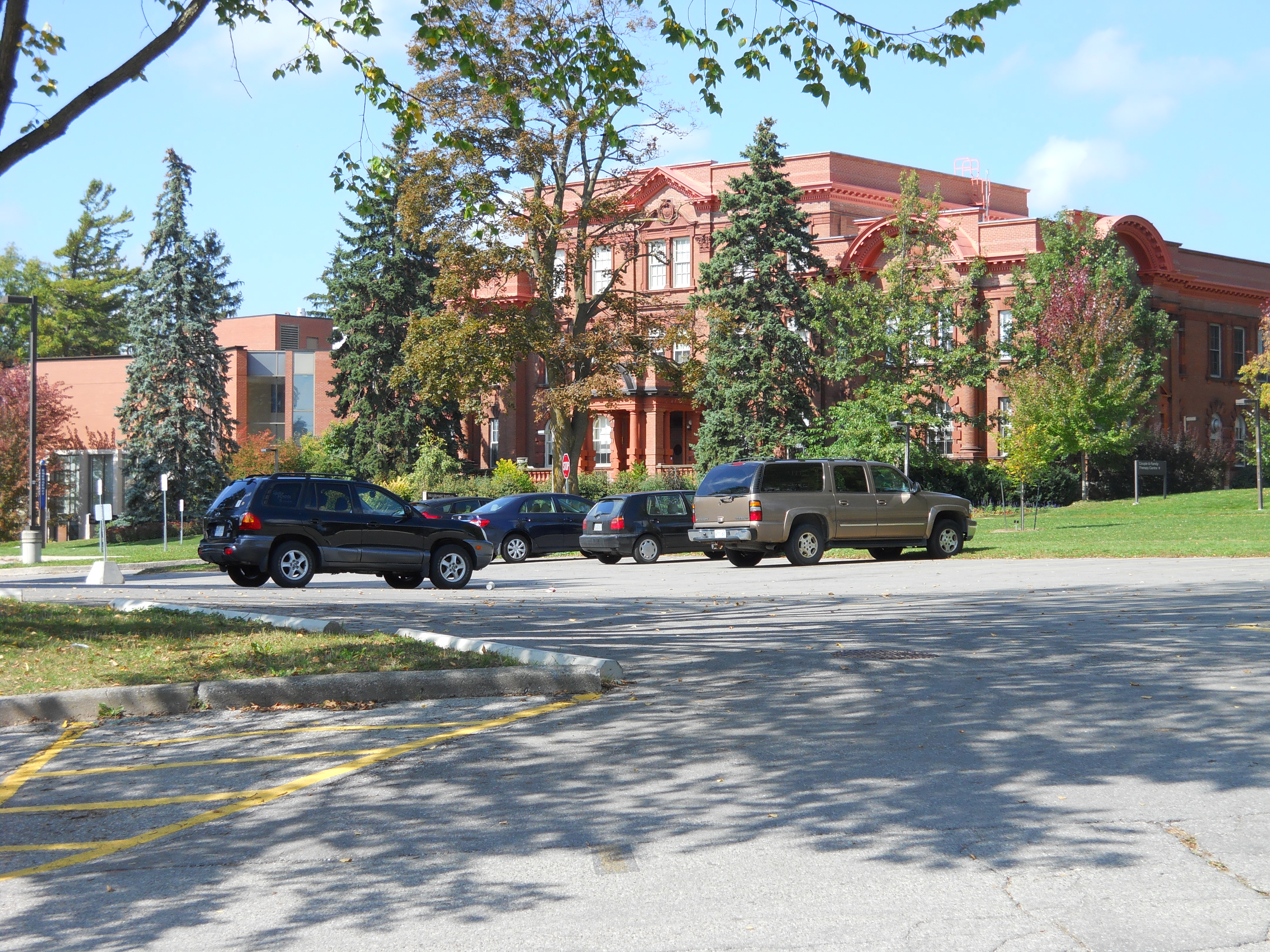
This parking lot on Macdonald St. is the site of the Armaments Building, demolished in 2009

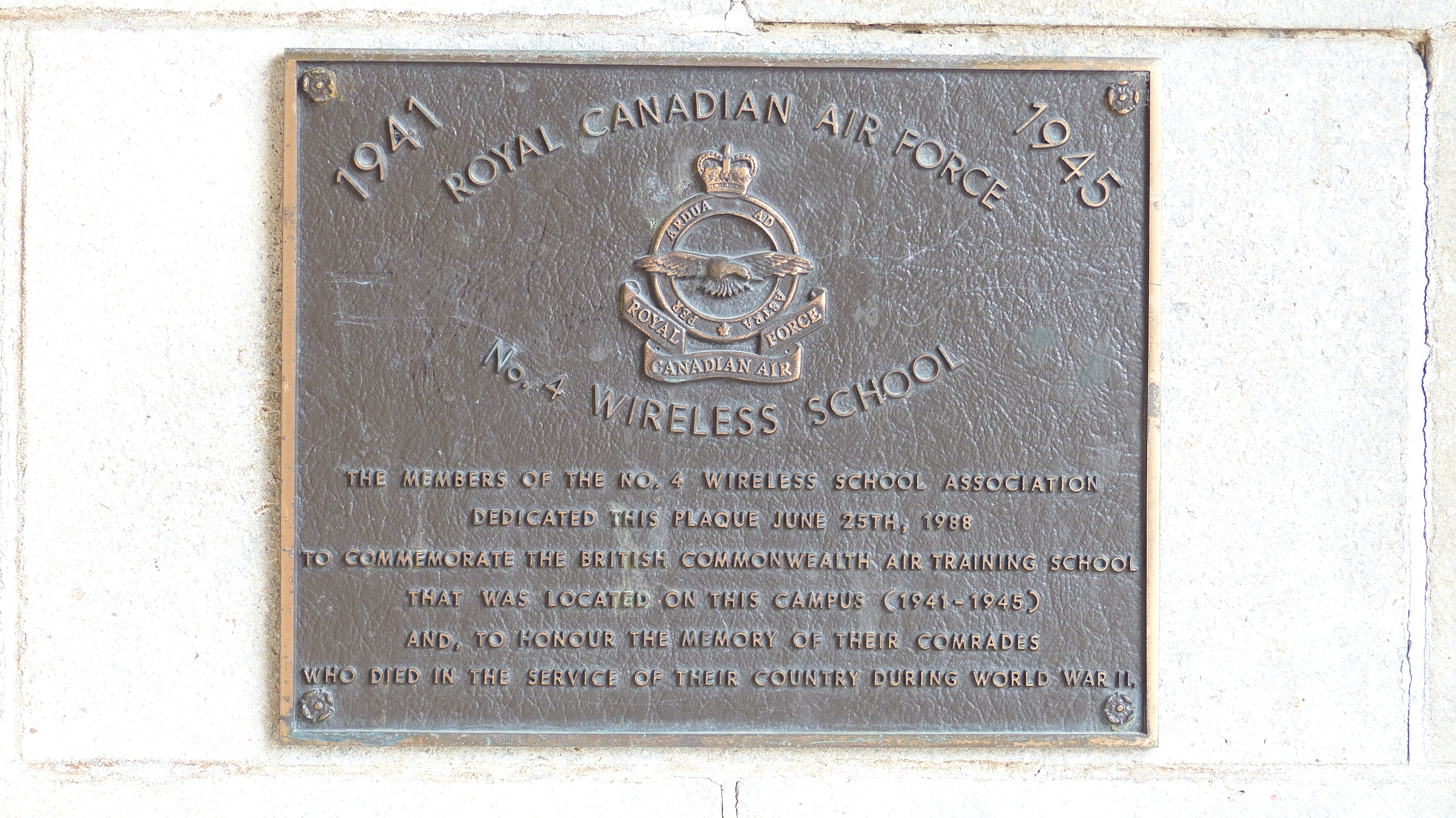
The plaque at the base of Johnston Hall tower

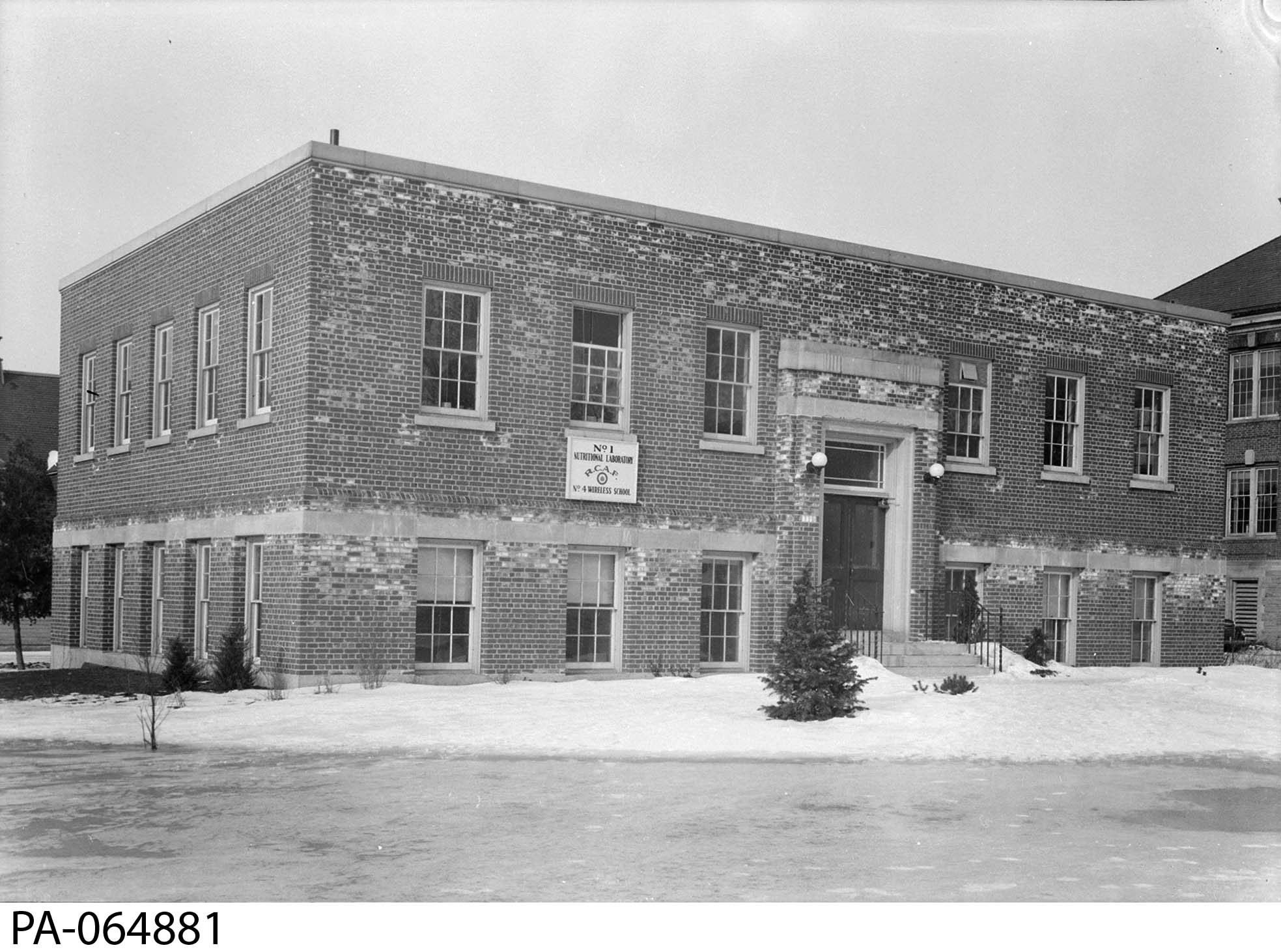
No. 1 Nutritional Laboratory (at OVC) in 1944

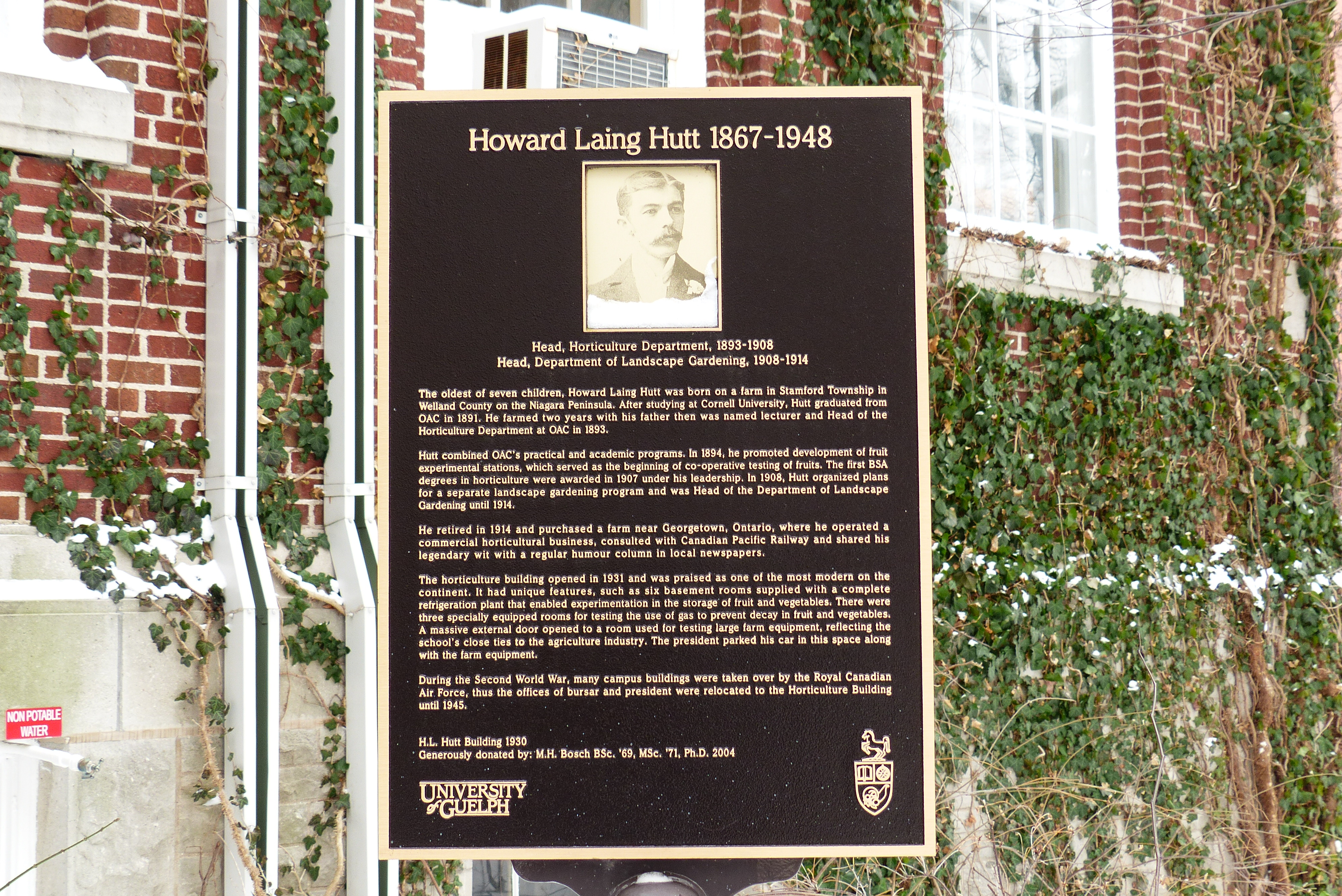
The plaque by the H. L. Hutt building

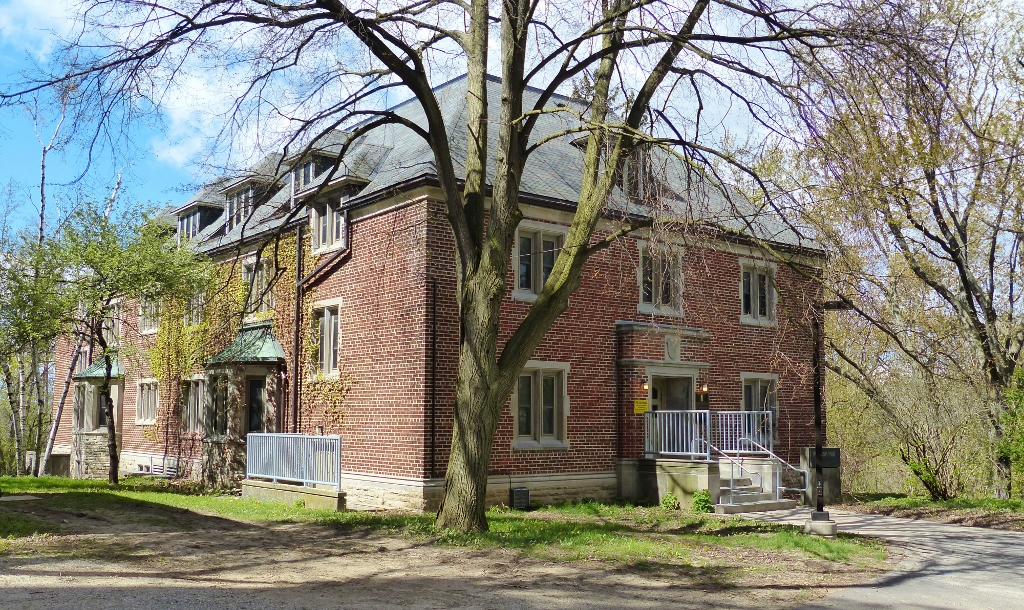
Watson Hall, the Officers' Quarters, in 2017

== Honours and awards ==
- Professor H. D. Branion was made an Officer of the Order of Orange-Nassau by the Dutch government in 1947.
- Father J. P. Lardie, Roman Catholic Chaplain of 4 WS 22 August 1942 - 12 May 1944, Mention in Despatches, 14 June 1945
- Air Commodore A. H. K. Russell was made a Commander, Order of the British Empire 1 January 1946

== Remembrance ==
Twelve airmen lost their lives while serving at No. 4 WS, five in flying accidents.

== See also ==
- Radio Direction Finding
- Radio Direction Finder
- Signal lamp
- Flag semaphore
- International Code of Signals
- Flags of Canada
- Canadian Warplane Heritage Museum
- RCAF Station Jarvis
- No. 6 (RCAF) Group
