= Nanticoke Refinery =

Oil refinery in Ontario, Canada

- Location of the Nanticoke Refinery in Ontario
- Location: Nanticoke, Ontario, Canada; 42.832926°N 80.045764°W

Refinery details
- Operator: Imperial Oil
- Owner: Imperial Oil
- Opened: 1978
- Capacity: 112,000 barrels per day (17,800 m^{3}/d)
- Complexity index: 9.82
- No. of employees: 300
- Refining units: alkylation, distillation of crude oil, hydrocracking, reforming catalytic, cracking catalytic, desulphuration, hydrofining
- No. of oil tanks: 53
- Refining center: Nanticoke

The Nanticoke Refinery is an oil refinery in Nanticoke, Ontario, Canada. It is owned and operated by Imperial Oil, which is majority owned by ExxonMobil. The refuels primarily go to Esso-branded gas stations in Canada and to other oil companies' distribution networks in Canada and the United States.

== History ==
Nanticoke refinery was originally built by Texaco Canada on the site of the former RCAF Station Jarvis. It started production on November 17, 1978. In 1987, the refinery went through modifications to improve efficiency. Imperial Oil became an owner of the refinery when it purchased Texaco's Canadian assets in 1989.

In 2004, a new gasoline hydrofining unit was built to treat gasoline ingredients from the Nanticoke and Sarnia refineries, followed by the second unit in 2006. A new desulphurization unit was commissioned in 2006.

In February 2007, a combination of a fire at the Nanticoke refinery and a strike at CN resulted in a shortage of gasoline at Esso stations in Ontario, which also drove up prices to more than a dollar a litre. Strangely, the fire had been discovered quickly but the fire suppression systems were not operating, and the handheld fire extinguishers had a faulty charge. Damage to the facility was made inevitable when the on-site fire brigade ran out of gas while en route to the location.

== Operating units ==
According to the Oil & Gas Journal, Sarnia has the following units in operation:

Unit	Capacity Bbl/day
Total Refinery Nameplate Capacity	113,500
Atmospheric Distillation	113,500
Vacuum Distillation	48,000
FCC	48,500
Naphtha Reformer	33,500
Naphtha Hydrotreater	25,500
Gasoline Hydrotreating	44,000
ULSD Hydrotreater	29,500
Alkylation	12,000

The Nanticoke Refinery is geared towards gasoline production with a large fluid cat cracking and an alkylation unit for producing high octane gasoline components.

The Refinery has a Nelson Complexity Index of 9.82, making it moderately to highly complex.

== Emissions ==
=== Greenhouse gas emissions ===
The refinery's performance can be tracked on the Government of Canada's website for emissions. The chart below provides the GhG performance in 2022:

==== Facility emissions for 2022 ====
Gas	Sum (tonnes)	Sum (tonnes CO2 eq )
CO2	1,140,309	1,140,309
CH4	301	8,434
N2O	15.8	4,185
HFCs	0	0
PFCs	0	0
SF6	0	0
Total :		1,152,928

Facility Emissions (tonnes CO2 eq ) by Year
Year	Emissions (tonnes CO2 eq)
2004	1,218,742
2005	1,304,098
2006	1,095,158
2007	1,131,382
2008	1,050,990
2009	1,067,616
2010	1,068,317
2011	1,024,786
2012	1,080,711
2013	1,077,567
2014	1,158,633
2015	1,116,301
2016	1,081,117
2017	951,177
2018	1,197,716
2019	962,222
2020	1,064,707
2021	1,130,330
2022	1,152,928

== Labour relations ==
The Imperial Nanticoke Refinery's workforce is represented by Unifor Local 900.

== Operating history and accidents ==
The refinery experienced a fire in February 2007 in its crude unit. This caused major concerns for the region due to the dearth of supply in late winter to the Toronto metro area. Gasoline prices increased considerably as a result in late February (to more than $1 CAD per liter). The quick return of the refinery to production was handicapped by the CN Rail strike. By mid-March, the refinery was back into full production.

== See also ==
- Oakville Refinery
