= Bacon Super T-6 =

American airplane

Super T-6
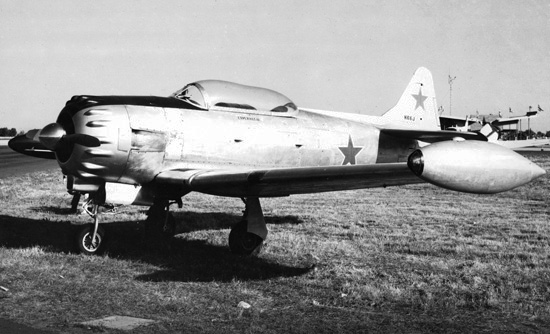
- The Super T-6

General information
- Type: Trainer aircraft
- National origin: United States
- Manufacturer: Erle L. Bacon Corporation
- Number built: 1

History
- First flight: April 1957
- Developed from: North American T-6 Texan

The Bacon Super T-6 was a North American AT-6F Texan that was modified during the mid 1950s by the Erle L. Bacon Corporation in an attempt to interest foreign air forces in an upgrade for their T-6 fleets. The aircraft did not receive sufficient interest for production, and only the single conversion was produced.

== History ==
Produced in 1944 and operated by the United States Army Air Forces alongside its brethren, following the end of World War II AT-6F Texan 44-82028 was sold on the civilian market, operating in Iceland for a time before being acquired by Bacon for conversion. Described as appearing "like an illicit hangar affair between a T-33 and a T-6", the conversion consisted of adding the canopy, tip tanks, and tricycle landing gear from a Lockheed T-33 Shooting Star; streamlining of the cowl and wings including jet stack exhaust, augmenter cooling, and a 4-foot (1.2 m) reduction in wingspan compared to the standard T-6; in addition, the cockpit was upgraded with a revised instrument panel and modernized avionics, and the aircraft's brakes were upgraded.

Bacon hoped to sell the conversion to foreign air forces, many of which operated large fleets of T-6 aircraft; after taxi trials at the end of 1956, it first flew in April 1957, and flight testing was considered generally successful. No interest from its intended customers materialized and the aircraft was sold on the civilian market; it eventually received a paint scheme, believed to have been intended for a role in a movie, resembling that of a Russian fighter aircraft. It was stored at Whiteman Air Park in California, and allowed to deteriorate in the elements, with its registration being cancelled in 2013.

== Specifications ==
Data from Jane's All The World's Aircraft 1958–59

General characteristics

- Crew: 2
- Length: 29 ft 6 in (8.99 m)
- Wingspan: 38 ft 6 in (11.73 m)
- Height: 11 ft 8.5 in (3.569 m)
- Fuel capacity: 100 US gal (83 imp gal; 379 L) in two tip tanks
- Powerplant: 1 × Pratt & Whitney R-1340-AN-1 Wasp 9-cylinder air-cooled radial piston engine, 600 hp (450 kW)
- Propellers: 2-bladed variable-pitch propeller

Performance

- Maximum speed: 225 mph (362 km/h, 196 kn)
- Cruise speed: 215 mph (346 km/h, 187 kn) at 64% power
- Rate of climb: 1,750 ft/min (8.9 m/s) at sea level

Armament

- .30-inch (7.6 mm) machine guns, underwing bomb racks or rocket launchers optional

== See also ==
- North American T-6 Texan variants

Related development

- North American NA-16
- North American BT-9
- North American T-6 Texan
- North American A-27
- North American P-64
- CAC Wirraway

Aircraft of comparable role, configuration, and era

- North American T-28 Trojan
- PZL TS-8 Bies
- Soko 522
- Yakovlev Yak-18

Related lists

- List of military aircraft of the United States
