= North American T-6 Texan variants =

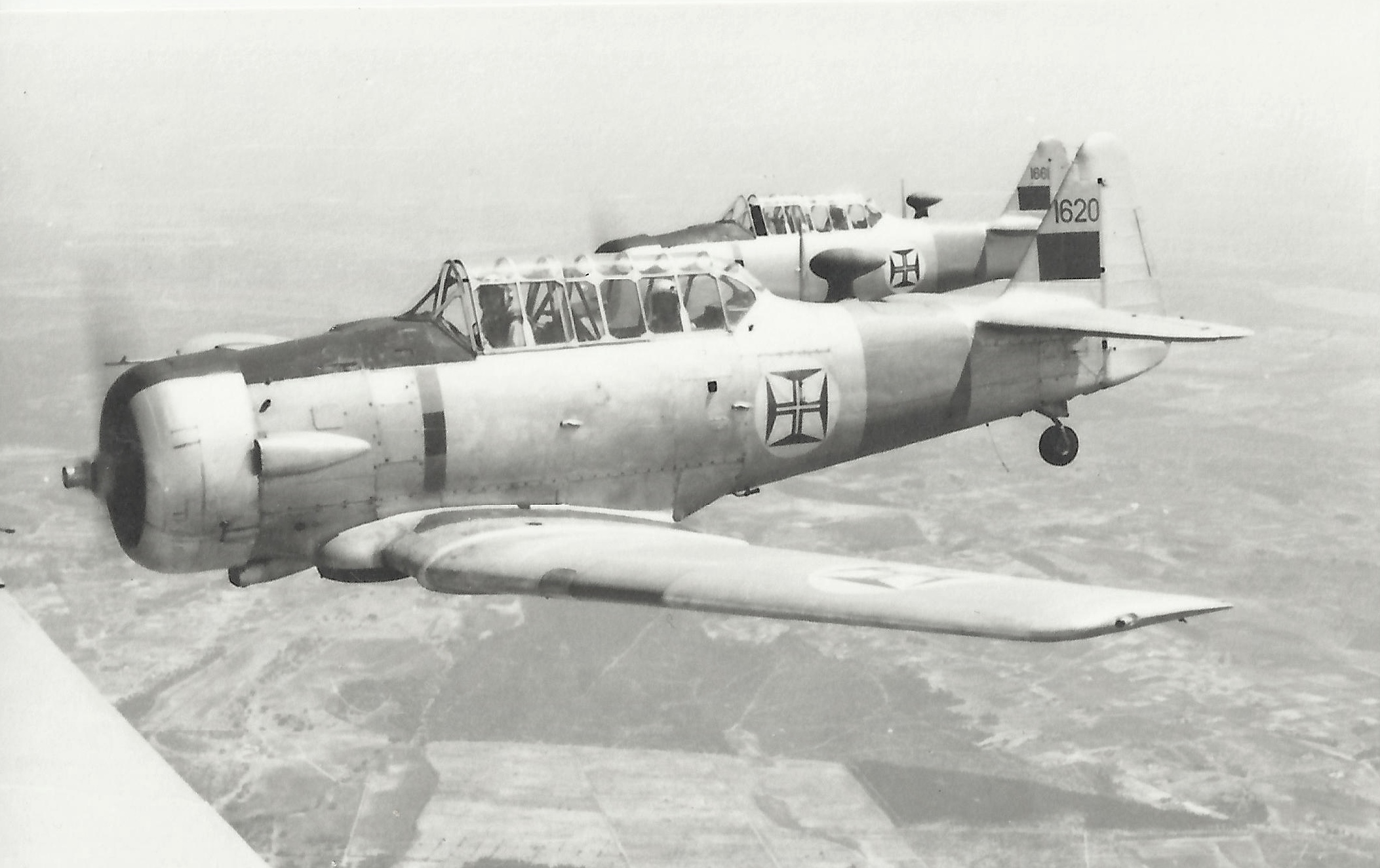
North American T-6Gs of the Portuguese Air Force in a training flight, during the 1960s.

This article describes the different variants of the North American T-6 Texan.

== BT Series ==
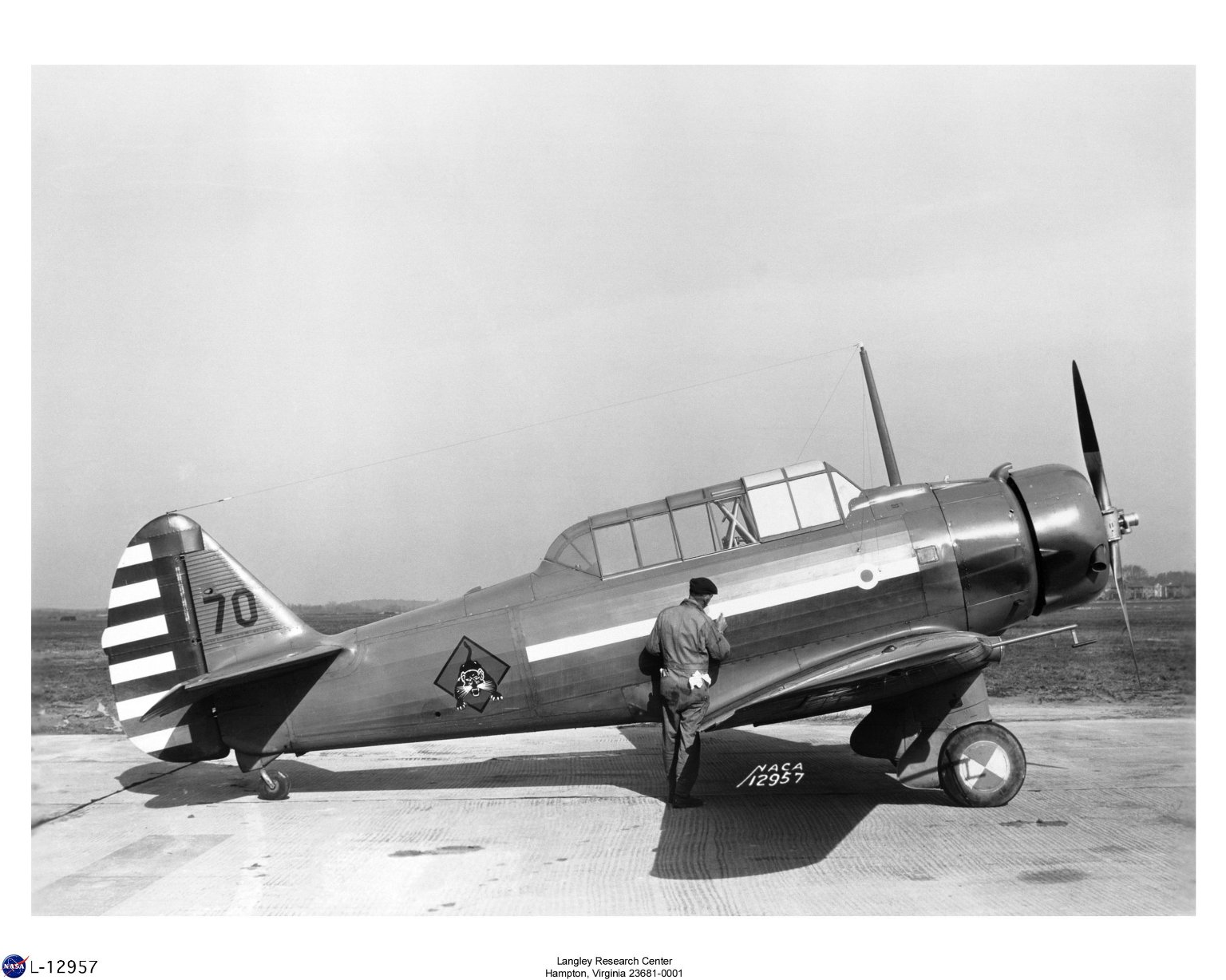
BT-9A at Langley

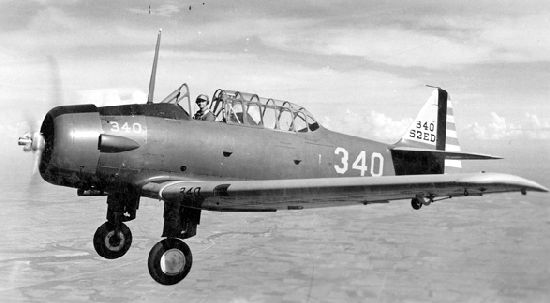
BT-14 in flight

BT-9
Basic Trainer with 400hp Wright R-975-7 Whirlwind and new canopy. Dangerous stall resulted in a variety of unsuccessful fixes. 42 built.
BT-9A
Armed BT-9 with one cowl gun and one rear flexible gun, and modified canopy. 40 built.
BT-9B
Minor changes from BT-9, unarmed. 117 built. 1 modified as sole BT-9D which was modified as a prototype for BT-14 with new outer wing panels and other alterations.
BT-9C
Wright R-975-7, similar to the BT-9A with minor changes. 66 built
BT-9D
One prototype only, Intermediate step in development of the BT-14.
Y1BT-10
600hp Pratt & Whitney R-1340-41. First aircraft of batch of BT-9C completed as Y1BT-10.
BT-10
Production version of Y1BT-10 - cancelled
BT-14
lengthened all metal fuselage and new canopy, Pratt & Whitney R-985-25, 251 built.
BT-14A
27 BT-14s were re-engined with 400 hp (298 kW) Pratt & Whitney R-985-11.

== BC Series ==
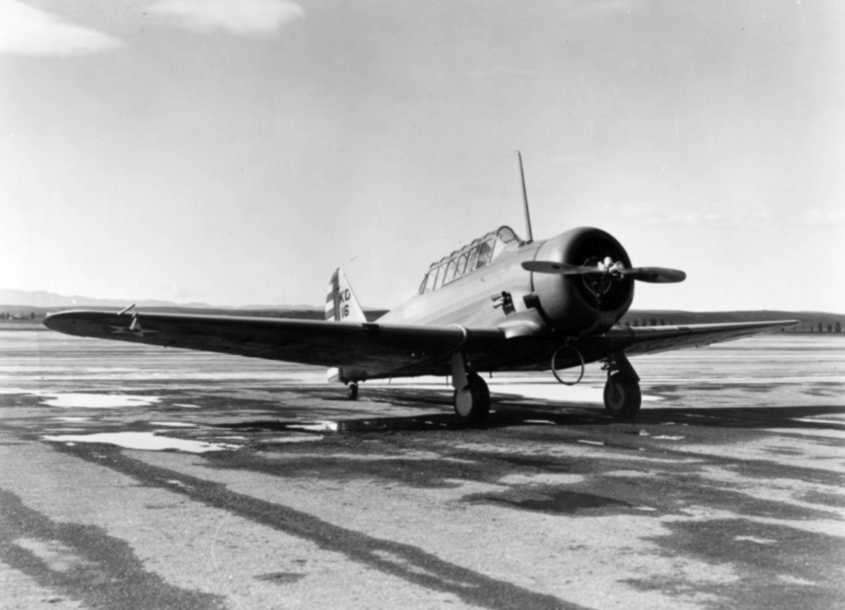
A North American BC-1, circa 1939.

North American BC-1
Basic Combat trainer version initial production version with 600hp R-1340-47 engine, Early examples had round rudder, later examples had square bottom rudder. 177 built
BC-1A
New longer semi-monocoque fuselage, new outer wing panels angled forward slightly, squared-off wingtips and triangular rudder, 93 built. Identifiable from later types by blister fairing between undercarriage.
BC-1B
One BC-1A fitted with an AT-6A wing centre section.
BC-1I
BC-1s converted to instrument trainers, 30 modified
BC-2
Prototype for what became the BC-1A, modified from NA-36 with details from NA-44, 3 bladed propeller.

== AT Series (Texan) ==
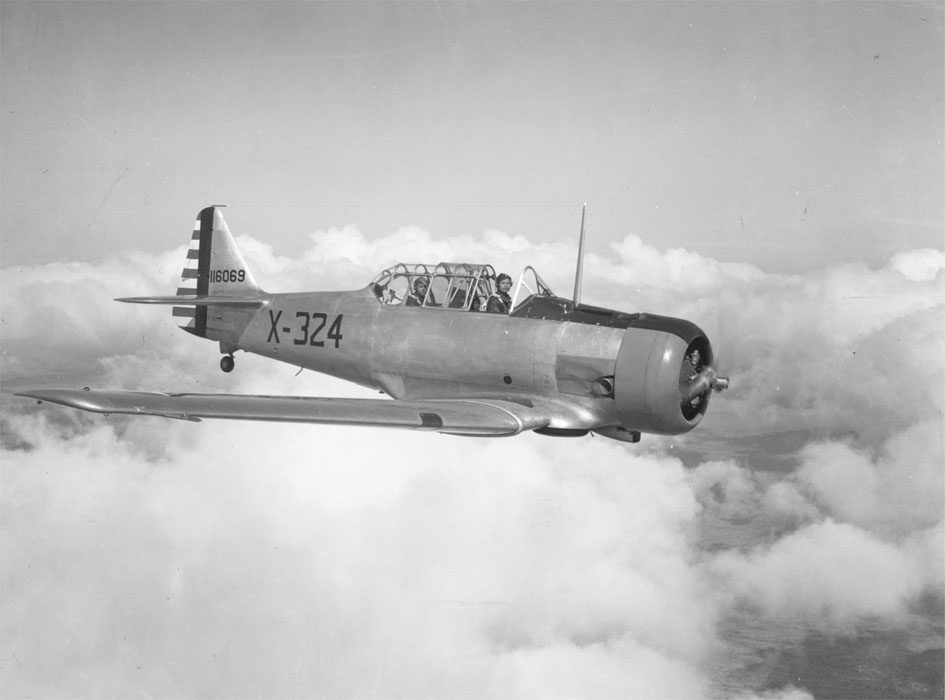
North American AT-6A (Charge Number NA-78) in flight

AT-6 Texan
Advanced Trainer - same as BC-1A with minor changes, powered by a 600hp R-1340-47 and armed with forward-firing 0.3in machine gun, nine original started as BC-1As and 85 built.
AT-6A
Same as AT-6 but with 600hp R-1340-49 and removable wing centre section fuel tanks, 1847 built with 298 transferred to the United States Navy as the SNJ-3. Survivors re-designated T-6A in 1948.
AT-6B
Same as AT-6A but with 600hp R-1340-AN-1 and dorsal gun fitted as standard, 400 built.
AT-6C
Same as AT-6B but with material changes to low-alloy steel and plywood, 2970 built including transfers to the United Kingdom as the Harvard IIA.
AT-6D
Same as AT-6B but with a 24V DC electrical system, 4388 built including transfers to the United States Navy as the SNJ-5 and to the United Kingdom as the Harvard III. Redesignated T-6D in 1948.
XAT-6E
One AT-6D re-engined with a 575hp V-770-9 V-12 inline engine for trials.
AT-6F
Same as AT-6D but with a strengthened airframe and minor modifications, 956 built including transfers to the United States Navy as the SNJ-6, Redesignated T-6F in 1948. Clear fixed rear canopy. Some went to Russia via Lend-Lease.
AT-16
Noorduyn built lend-lease Harvards, 1800 built

== A-27 ==
North American A-27
Two-seat attack version of AT-6 with a 785hp R-1820-75 engine and five 0.3in machine guns (two in nose, one on each wing and one dorsal). Designation used for ten aircraft for Thailand impressed into United States Army Air Corps use.

== T-6 (Texan) ==
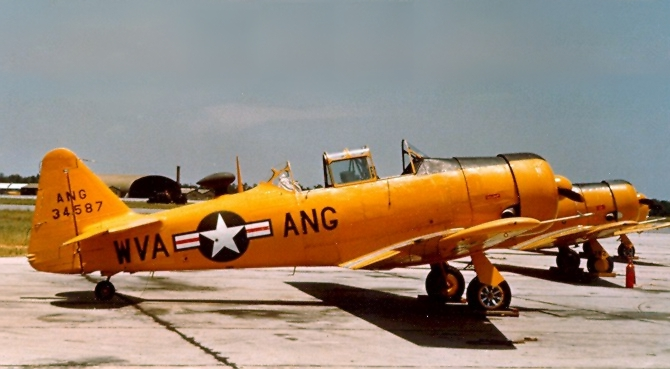
West Virginia ANG T-6G.

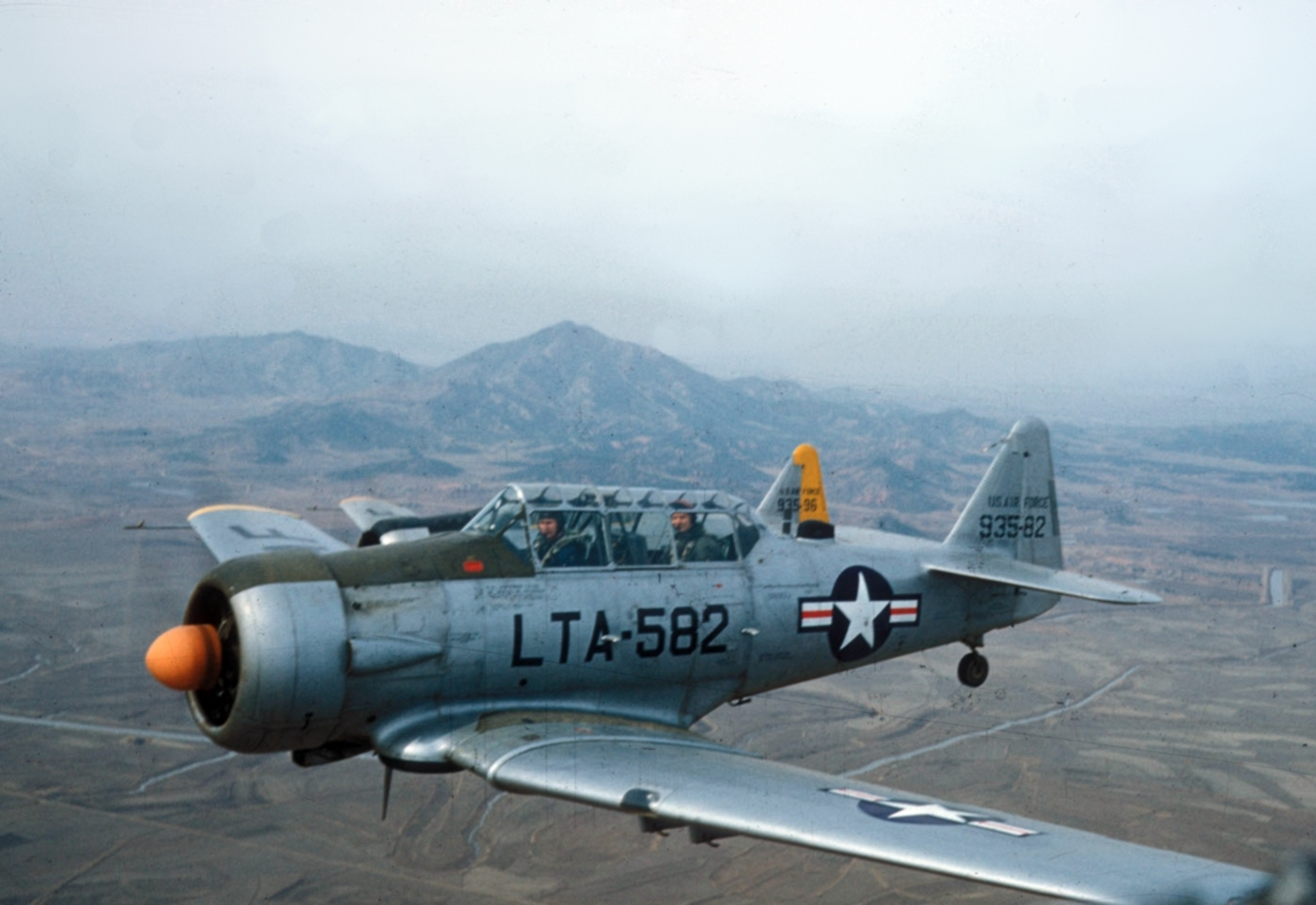
USAF LT-6Gs during the Korean War.

T-6A
AT-6As re-designated in 1948.
T-6C
AT-6Cs re-designated in 1948 including 68 re-builds with new serial numbers.
T-6D
AT-6D re-designated in 1948 including 35 re-builds with new serial numbers.
T-6F
AT-6F re-designated in 1948.
T-6G
Earlier model AT-6/T-6s re-built between 1949-1953 with improved cockpit layout, increased fuel capacity, steerable tailwheel, updated radios and a 600hp R-1340-AN-1 engine. Identifiable by simplified canopy framing. 2068 modified.
FT-6G
T-6G converted as a counter-insurgency (COIN) aircraft, armed with .30-caliber machine guns, rockets, and bombs. One prototype.
LT-6G
T-6Gs converted for battlefield surveillance and forward air controller duties, 97 modified. Nicknamed Mosquito.
T-6H
T-6Fs converted T-6G standard. Some sources state T-6H was the original designation for T-6Gs converted at the Columbus, Ohio plant.
T-6J
Designation assigned to 285 Canadian Car and Foundry-built Harvard Mk 4s supplied to Belgium, France, Italy, Portugal and West Germany using Mutual Defense Assistance Program funds.
KN-1
A single T-6F damaged in a crash during the Korean War that was rebuilt as a floatplane by the Republic of Korea Navy.
Bacon Super T-6
A single AT-6F converted in 1956 with tricycle gear, bubble canopy and tip tanks; no production followed.
B.F.8
(Thai: บ.ฝ.๘) Royal Thai Armed Forces designation for the T-6.

== NJ/SNJ Texan ==
NJ-1
United States Navy specification advanced trainer powered with 550hp Pratt & Whitney R-1340-6. Some re-engined with later versions of R-1340. Similar to BT-9, 40 built.

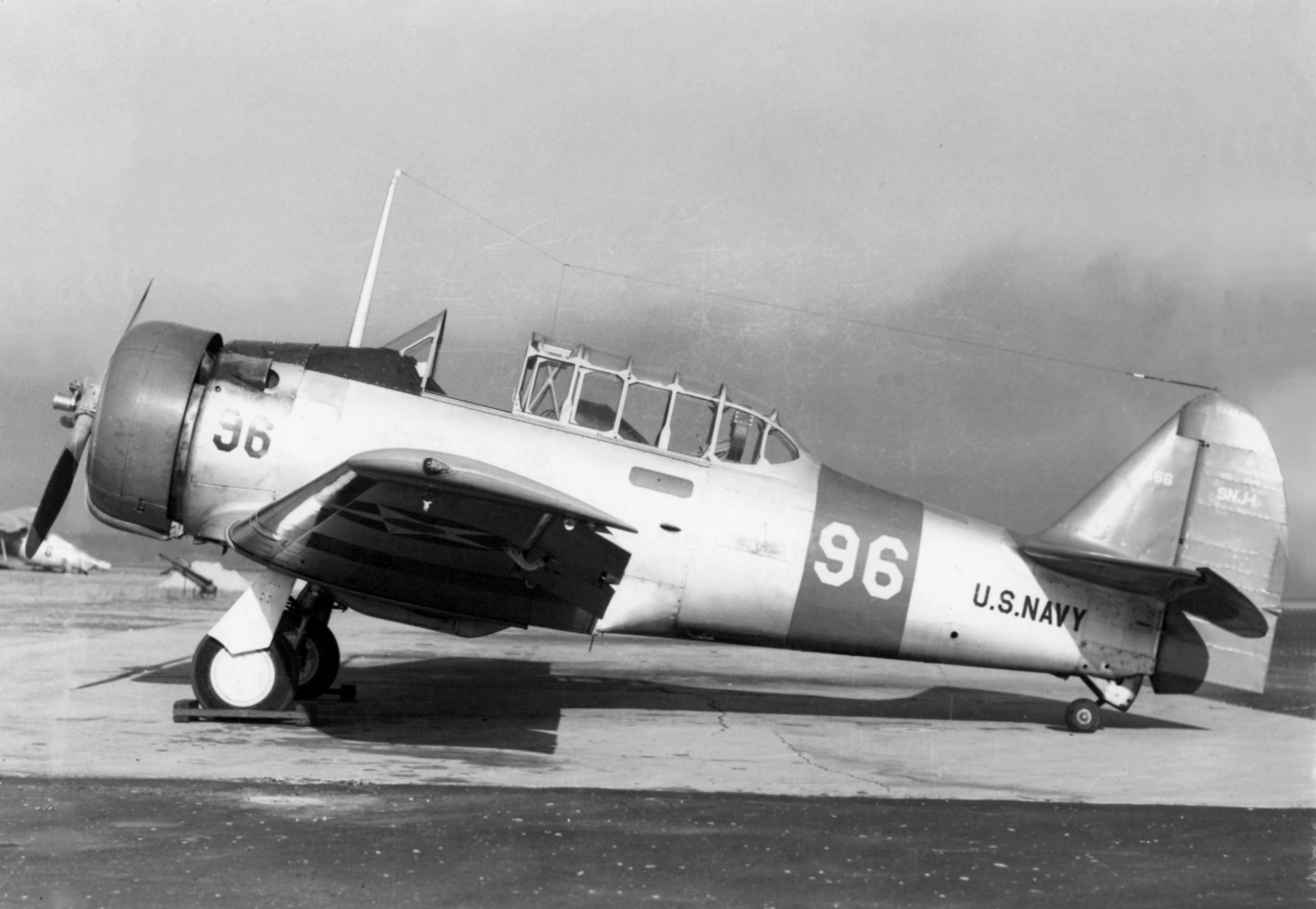
An early SNJ-1 at NAS Pensacola. Note the original form of the tail.

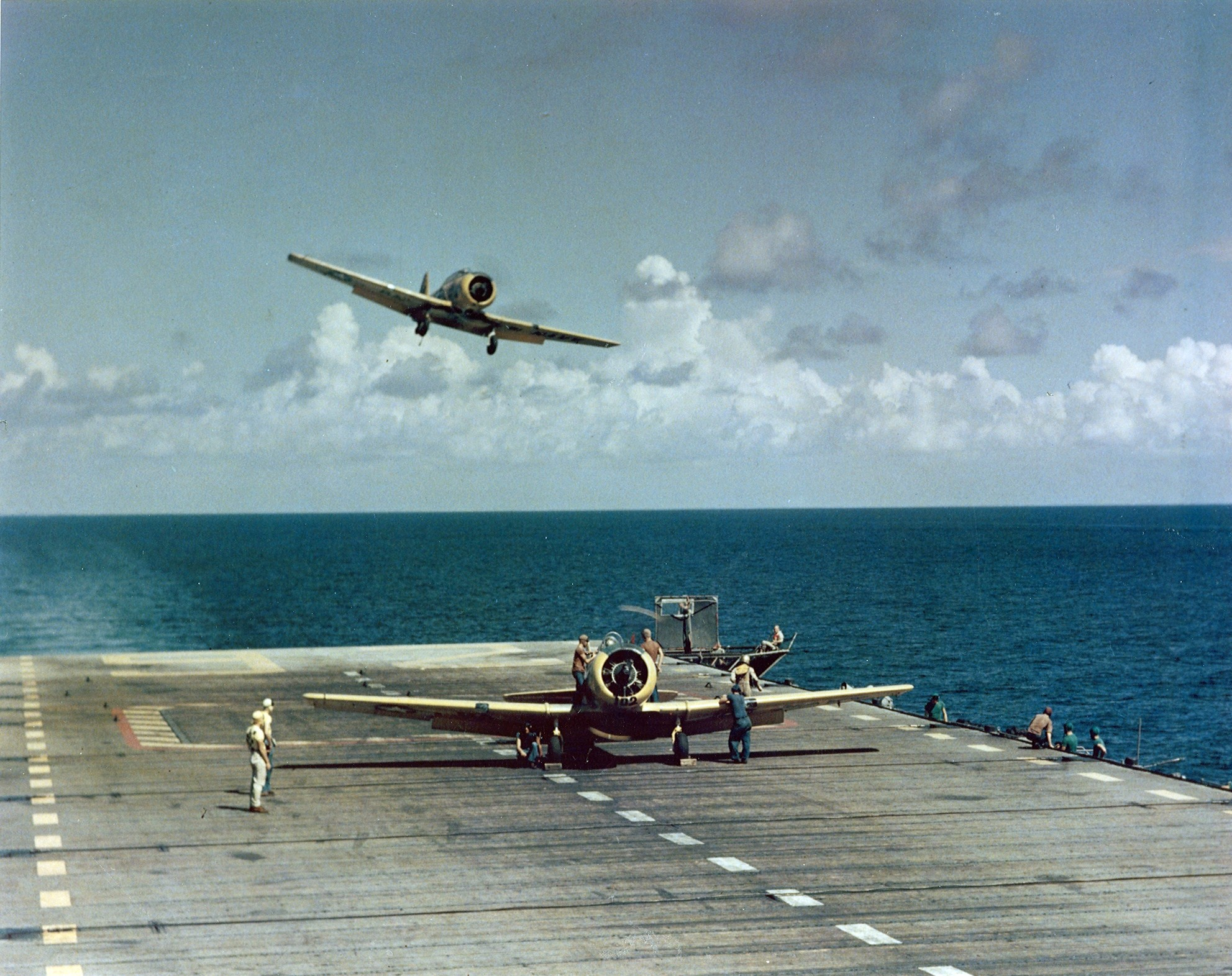
The SNJ-3C/-4C/-5C versions had an arrestor hook for carrier landings.

SNJ-1
Similar to Harvard I but with BC-1 wing center section, metal-covered fuselage and late T-6 type wing, 16 built.
SNJ-2
Same as SNJ-1 but with a R-1340-56 engine and changes to carburetor and oil cooler scoops, 61 built.
SNJ-3
Same as AT-6A, 270 built and 296 transferred from USAAC.
SNJ-3C
SNJ-3 converted as deck landing trainers with tailhook arrester gear, twelve modified.
SNJ-4
Same as AT-6C, 1240 built.
SNJ-4C
SNJ-4s converted as deck landing trainers with tailhook arrester gear.
SNJ-5
AT-6Ds transferred from the USAAC, 1573 aircraft.
SNJ-5C
SNJ-5s converted as deck landing trainers with tailhook arrester gear.
SNJ-6
AT-6Fs transferred from the USAAF, 411 aircraft.
SNJ-7
Early model SNJs modified to T-6G-equivalent standards in 1952. 50 ordered; contract cancelled after six converted.
SNJ-7B
An armed variant of the SNJ-7.
SNJ-7C
Three SNJ-7s converted as deck landing trainers with tailhook arrester gear.
SNJ-8
Order for 240 cancelled.

== Harvard ==
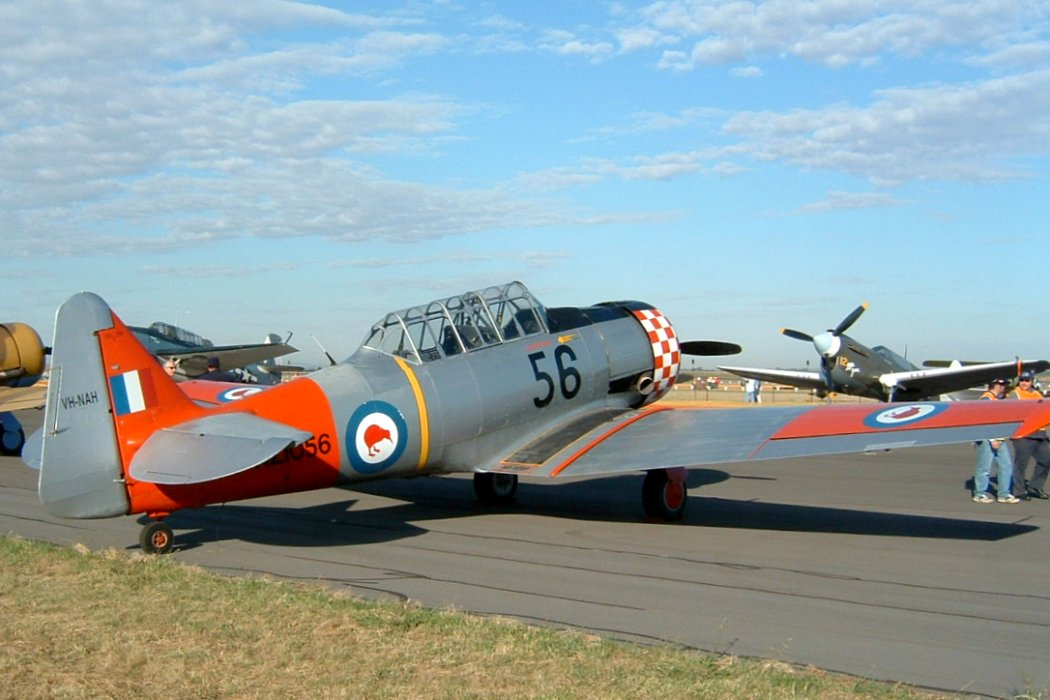
Harvard IIA

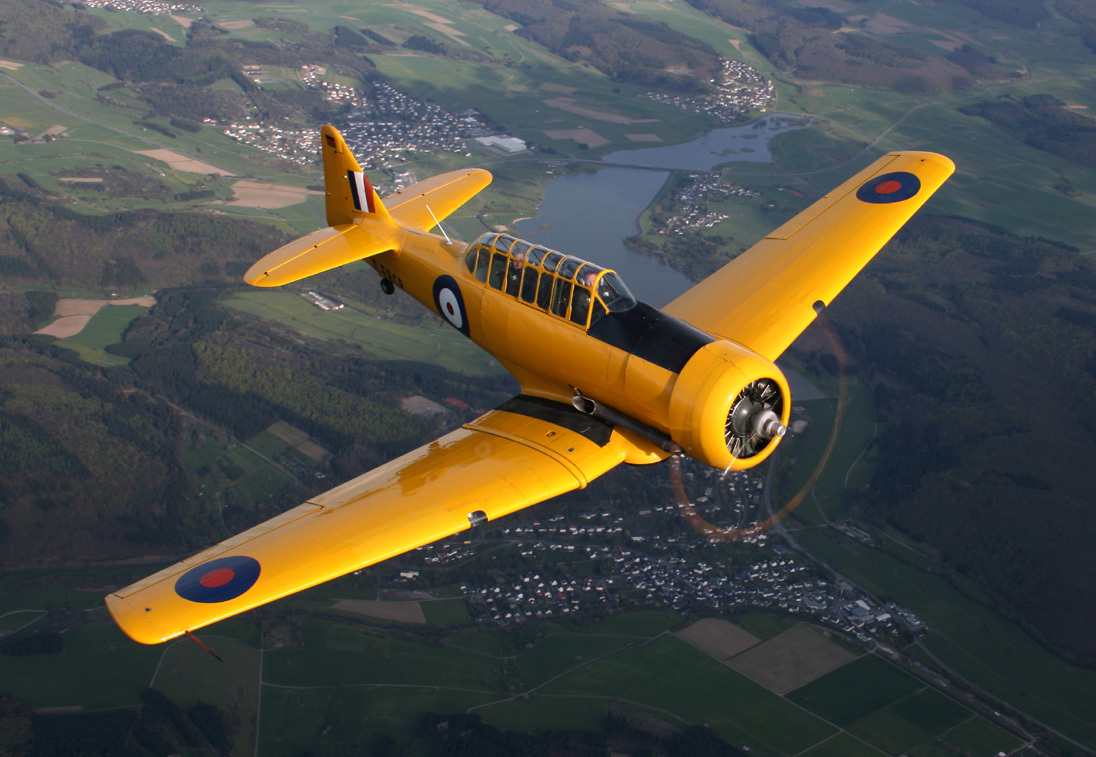
Restored Harvard II in wartime colours

Harvard I
Similar to BC-1 but without rear gun and with a 600hp R-1340-S3H1 engine, 400 aircraft.
Harvard II
Similar to BC-1A, 526 built, again without provision for rear gunner.
Harvard IIA (RAF & Commonwealth)
AT-6C, many with wooden rear fuselages when first delivered.
Harvard IIA (RCAF)
'Armed' Harvard II - Any RCAF Harvard II or IIB fitted with wing guns, rockets or bombs.
Harvard IIB
Noorduyn built Mk.IIs, some to US orders as AT-16s for lend-lease. Transfers back from the USAAF (1800) and 757 built.
Harvard T.T. IIB
Target Tug - 42 aircraft built for the RAF by Noorduyn. Number probably included in II totals.
Harvard IIF
Bombing/gunnery trainer - One-off modified from Mk.II with bomb aimer's blister and AT-6 type cockpit.
Harvard III
AT-6D, 537 aircraft for RAF.
Harvard 4
Canadian development of Harvard II paralleling the T-6G, built by Canadian Car and Foundry; 270 for the RCAF and 285 for export, funded by the USAF, as T-6Js.
Harvard 4K
Belgian designation for Harvard IIs and IIIs upgraded to roughly Harvard 4 specifications.
Harvard 4KA
Belgian designation for armed variant of 4K.

== North American company designations ==
NAA Charge Number	NAA Model or Designation	Customer	Engine Installed	Number built/ Modified	Notes
NA-16	NA-16	USAAC (trials)	Wright R-975-E3 Whirlwind; 420 hp (310 kW)	1	Prototype NX-2080, was open cockpit, received greenhouse canopy for trials
NA-18	NA-18	USAAC (trials)	Wright R-975-E3 Whirlwind; 420 hp (310 kW)	1 (modified)	Ex-NA-16, won against Seversky BT-8 and Curtiss-Wright CW-19R, to Argentina in 1937
NA-19	NA-19/BT-9	USAAC	Wright R-975-7 Whirlwind; 400 hp (300 kW)	42	Minor changes from NA-18, new canopy
NA-19A	NA-19A/BT-9A	USAAC	Wright R-975-7 Whirlwind; 400 hp (300 kW)	40	Armed BT-9 with one cowl gun and one rear flexible gun, and suitably modified canopy.
NA-20	NA-16-2H	Trials, to Fuerza Aérea Hondureña (FAH)	Wright R-975 Whirlwind (Unknown sub-type/HP)	1	NC16025 originally intended as demonstrator for China
NA-22	NA-22	USAAC (rejected)	Wright R-760ET; 225 hp (168 kW)	1	Dangerously underpowered
NA-23	NA-23/BT-9B	USAAC	Wright R-975-7 Whirlwind; 400 hp (300 kW)	117	Unarmed. 1 modified as sole BT-9D as BT-14 prototype with new outer wings and other alterations.
NA-26	BC-1	Trials, to Royal Canadian Air Force (RCAF)	Pratt & Whitney R-1340-S3H1 Wasp; 550 hp (410 kW)	1	Basic Combat Demonstrator NX18990 - no relation to later BC-1, first retractable gear variant, later modified with Yale parts.
NA-27	NA-16-2H	to Fokker and Koninklijke Luchtmacht (KLu) (Netherlands)	Pratt & Whitney R-1340-S2H1 Wasp; 500 hp (370 kW)	1	European demonstrator armed NA-26 with fixed gear.
NA-28	NJ-1	USN	Pratt & Whitney R-1340-6 Wasp; 550 hp (410 kW)	40	USN specification up engined BT-9 as advanced trainer, some reengined with later R-1340 versions.
NA-29	BT-9C	USAAC	Wright R-975-7 Whirlwind; 400 hp (300 kW)	67	as per BT-9A with minor changes. First aircraft completed as Y1BT-10.
NA-30	BT-10	USAAC (Cancelled)	Pratt & Whitney R-1340-41 Wasp; 600 hp (450 kW)	0	cancelled production version of Y1BT-10
NA-31	NA-16-4M/ Sk-14/14A	Flygvapnet (Sweden)	Wright R-975-E3 Whirlwind; 420 hp (310 kW)/ Piaggio P.VIIc 525 hp (391 kW)	137	BT-9C but different engine variant. Licence production (NAA built 1, ASJA 76, SAAB 60), Trialled undercarriage for Saab 21.
NA-32	NA-16-1A	Royal Australian Air Force (RAAF)	Pratt & Whitney R-1340 Wasp (unknown sub-type/HP)	1	Fixed gear pattern aircraft similar to NJ-1 or Y1BT-10, not followed up.
NA-33	NA-16-2K/ Wirraway	RAAF	Pratt & Whitney R-1340-S1H1G; 600 hp (450 kW)	756	Retractable gear pattern aircraft for Australia, 1 built by NAA and 755 by Commonwealth Aircraft Corporation)
NA-34	NA-16-4P	Fuerza Aérea Argentina (FAA)	Wright R-975-E3 Whirlwind; 420 hp (310 kW)	29	First major export order (not licence), had 2 cowl guns, a flexible rear gun and a radio mast
NA-36	BC-1	USAAC	Pratt & Whitney R-1340-47 Wasp; 500 hp (370 kW)	177	Retractable undercarriage and first aircraft with square bottom rudder. DF loop under wing, blister covers fuel transfer gear on centerline aft of wheel wells.
NA-37	NA-16-4R/KXA1	Imperial Japanese Navy (IJN - Evaluation)	Pratt & Whitney R-985-9CG Wasp Junior; 500 hp (370 kW)	1	Technology demonstrator, unarmed, fixed undercarriage and three-bladed prop.
NA-38	NA-16-4M	Flygvapnet (Sweden)	Wright R-975-E3 Whirlwind; 420 hp (310 kW)	1	same as NA-31
NA-41	NA-16-4	Republic of China Air Force (RoCAF)	Wright R-975 Whirlwind (unknown sub-type/HP)	35	Similar to BT-9C with short fabric covered fuselage, combat aircraft with two fixed forward guns and one flexible rear gun.
NA-42	NA-16-2A	Fuerza Aérea Hondureña (FAH - Honduras)	Pratt & Whitney R-1340 Wasp; 520 hp (390 kW)	2	
NA-43	NA-16-1G	Exército Brasileiro (Brazilian Army) (Cancelled)	Wright R-975 Whirlwind	0	Similar to BT-9C
NA-44	NA-44	to RCAF	Wright SG-1820-F52 Cyclone; 750 hp (560 kW)	1	Prototype two-seat export combat aircraft similar to BC-1A
NA-45	NA-16-1GV	Aviación Militar Nacional Bolivariana de Venezuela (Venezuela)	Pratt & Whitney R-1340 Wasp	3	Possibly originally built to Brazilian contract
NA-46	NA-16-4	Marinha do Brasil (Brazilian Navy)	Wright R-975-53 Whirlwind; 400 hp (300 kW)	12	Similar to BT-9C with wingtip slats, small DF loop under fuselage.
NA-47	NA-16-4RW/KXA-2	Imperial Japanese Navy (IJN) (Evaluation)	Wright R-975-E3 Whirlwind; 420 hp (310 kW)	1	Technology demonstrator
NA-48	NA-16-3C	Republic of China Air Force (RoCAF)	Pratt & Whitney R-1340 Wasp	15	Similar to NA-45
NA-49	NA-16-1E/ Harvard I	Royal Air Force (RAF)	Pratt & Whitney R-1340-S3H1 Wasp; 600 hp (450 kW)	400	Straight wing trailing edge, square rudder, short fabric covered fuselage, fixed rear canopy, no blister under wing center section
NA-50	NA-50	Fuerza Aérea del Perú (FAP)	Wright R-1820-G3 Cyclone	7	Single-seat fighter, NA-16-5
NA-52	SNJ-1	USN	Pratt & Whitney R-1340-6 Wasp; 500 hp (370 kW)	16	Short metal fuselage, square rudder, late wings, fixed rear on canopy
NA-54	BC-2	USAAC	Pratt & Whitney R-1340-45 Wasp; 600 hp (450 kW)	3	Based on NA-36 with some improvements from NA-44, 3-bladed prop and two blister under wing center section.
NA-55−1	BC-1A	USAAC	Pratt & Whitney R-1340-47/-49 Wasp; 600 hp (450 kW)	83	Bought for researve and Air National Guard (ANG) units.
NA-56	NA-16-4	Republic of China Air Force (RoCAF)	Pratt & Whitney R-1340 Wasp	50	Similar to NA-55 (long metal fuselage, fixed gear and engine differences)
NA-57	NA-57/ NAA 57 P-2	Armée de l'Air (France)	Wright R-975-E3 Whirlwind; 420 hp (310 kW)	230	Improved NA-23, many captured and used by Germany, some retained by Vichy France
NA-58	BT-14/BT-14A	USAAC	Pratt & Whitney R-985-25 Wasp Junior; 450 hp (340 kW)	251	Similar to Harvard II except for fixed undercarriage and smaller engine. 27 re-engined with 400 hp (300 kW) Pratt & Whitney R-985-11 as BT-14A
NA-59	AT-6-NA	USAAC	Pratt & Whitney R-1340-47 Wasp; 600 hp (450 kW)	94	First examples converted from NA-55 while still on production line, some examples had small DF loop installed
NA-61	NA-16-1E/ Harvard I	RCAF	Pratt & Whitney R-1340-S3H1 Wasp; 600 hp (450 kW)	30	Later fitted with extended exhaust for cabin heater
NA-64	NA-64/ NAA 64-P2/ Yale I	Armée de l'Air (France)	Wright R-975-E3 Whirlwind; 420 hp (310 kW)	230	119 to Royal Canadian Air Force as Yale I, briefly used by France, many captured by Germany
NA-65	SNJ-2	USN	Pratt & Whitney R-1340-36 Wasp	36	Blister covering fuel transfer gear along centerline aft of wheel wells
NA-66	Harvard II	RAF	Pratt & Whitney R-1340 Wasp	600	as per NA-59 but fixed rear canopy and no rear gun, also to RNZAF and RCAF, Southern Rhodesia
NA-68	NA-50A/P-64	Royal Thai Air Force (RTAF - Thailand)	Wright R-1820-77 Cyclone; 870 hp (650 kW)	6	Short outer wing panel angled much further forward than earlier types. Diverted with start of Pacific war to USAAF as P-64
NA-69	NA-44/A-27	Royal Thai Air Force (RTAF - Thailand)	Wright R-1820-75 Cyclone; 745 hp (556 kW)	10	Fully armed as attack aircraft. Diverted with start of Pacific war to USAAF as A-27
NA-71	NA-16-3	Aviación Militar Nacional Bolivariana de Venezuela (Venezuela)	Pratt & Whitney R-1340-S3H1 Wasp; 550 hp (410 kW)	3	Two nose guns and rear gun, no wing guns.
NA-72	NA-44	Exército Brasileiro (Brazilian Army)	Pratt & Whitney R-1340-AN1/S1H1 Wasp; 600 hp (450 kW)	30	Attack bomber, fitted with small DF loop under fuselage.
NA-74	NA-44	Fuerza Aérea de Chile (FACh)	Pratt & Whitney R-1340 Wasp	12	Attack bomber, fitted with small DF loop under fuselage.
NA-75	Harvard II	RCAF	Pratt & Whitney R-1340 Wasp	100	Follow on order to NA-66
NA-76	Harvard II	RAF	Pratt & Whitney R-1340 Wasp	450	Ordered by France, taken over by RAF, many to RCAF
NA-77	AT-6A/SNJ-3	USAAC, USN	Pratt & Whitney R-1340 Wasp	637	
NA-78	AT-6A/SNJ-3/3C	USAAC, USN	Pratt & Whitney R-1340 Wasp	568	As NA-77, first aircraft built in Texas, and to use name "Texan"
NA-79	SNJ-2	USN / Flygvapnet (Sweden) as Sk 16C	Pratt & Whitney R-1340-56 Wasp; 550 hp (410 kW)	25	
NA-81	Harvard II	RAF	Pratt & Whitney R-1340 Wasp	125	same as previous RAF Harvard II order.
NA-84	AT-6B	USAAC	Pratt & Whitney R-1340-AN-1 Wasp; 600 hp (450 kW)	400	
NA-85	SNJ-3	USN	Pratt & Whitney R-1340 Wasp	0	Cancelled duplicate of NA-78 for record purposes.
NA-88	AT-6C/AT-6D/XAT-6E; SNJ-4/SNJ-5	USAAC/USAAF, USN	Pratt & Whitney R-1340 Wasp/ Ranger V-770-9; 575 hp (429 kW)	9331	(last 800 as NA.121) AT-6D used 24 volt electrics, vs previous 12 volt systems. XAT-6E used Ranger V-770.
NA-119	AT-6D	Força Aérea Brasileira (FAB)	Pratt & Whitney R-1340 Wasp	81	20 examples built in Brazil under licence
NA-121	AT-6D/AT-6F	USAAF, USN	Pratt & Whitney R-1340 Wasp	4378	800 AT-6Ds, 211 SNJ-5, 956 AT-6F and 411 SNJ-6. AT-6F and SNJ-6 have clear fixed rear canopy section
NA-128	AT-6D	USAAF, USN	Pratt & Whitney R-1340 Wasp	0	Canceled orders to have been built in Texas.
NA-168	T-6G/LT-6G	USAF/ANG	Pratt & Whitney R-1340 Wasp	109	Re-manufactured and updated from earlier versions. Mostly internal but canopy simplified slightly.
NA-182	T-6G/LT-6G	USAF/ANG	Pratt & Whitney R-1340 Wasp	824	as per NA-168, Re-manufactured/updated.
NA-186	Harvard 4	RCAF/ MDAP	Pratt & Whitney R-1340 Wasp	555	Sole new post war production.
NA-188	T-6G/LT-6G	USAF/ANG	Pratt & Whitney R-1340 Wasp	107	Re-manufactured and converted from earlier versions.
NA-195	T-6G/LT-6G	USAF/ANG	Pratt & Whitney R-1340 Wasp	11	Re-manufactured and converted from earlier versions.
NA-197	T-6G	USAF/ANG	Pratt & Whitney R-1340 Wasp	110	Re-manufactured and converted from T-6D.
NA-198	SNJ-8	USN	Pratt & Whitney R-1340 Wasp	0	Cancelled Contract for SNJ-8 (similar to T-6G)
