= FMA I.Ae 38 =

Experimental tailless aircraft

IA 38
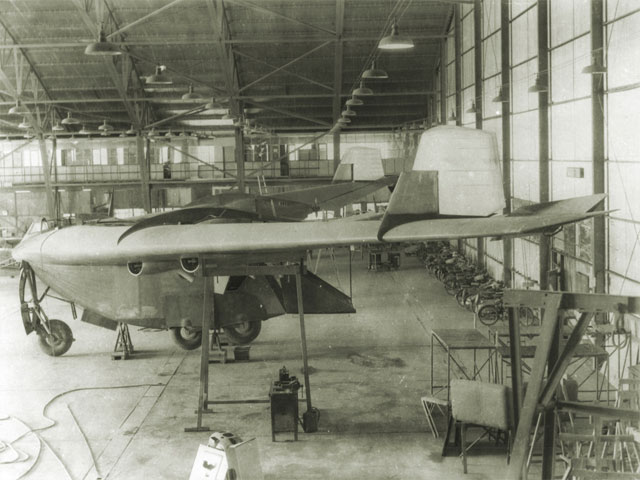
- The prototype IAe.38 under construction

General information
- Type: Experimental tailless transport aircraft
- National origin: Argentina
- Manufacturer: DINFIA
- Number built: 1

History
- First flight: 1960

The DINFIA IA 38 was a 1960s Argentine four-engine experimental tailless transport aircraft, designed under the direction of Reimar Horten and based on the German Horten Ho VIII project and built by the DINFIA.

== Development ==
The IA 38 was an experimental cargo aircraft based on research by Reimar Horten. The design was developed to meet a 1950 requirement for an aircraft to carry citrus fruits (and in particular, oranges) from the west of Argentina to Buenos Aires, there being no rail links (except to San Luis, Mendoza and other cities) while the roads were inadequate for heavy trucks. It was an all-metal tailless shoulder-wing swept monoplane, with the vertical control surfaces located near the tips of the wings. The short, stubby fuselage was fitted with a tricycle landing gear, with a retractable nosewheel and fixed mainwheels. Power was provided by four radial engines mounted within the wings, driving pusher propellers mounted clear of the wing trailing edges. The aircraft was designed to use 750 hp (560 kW) I.Ae. 19R El Indio, but these were not available and the prototype was forced to use 450 hp (340 kW) I.Ae. 16 El Gaucho engines instead. A crew of two were sat in an enclosed cockpit above the leading edge of the wing. A cargo compartment within the fuselage had a capacity of 30 m^{3} (1,100 cu ft) (with a 6 long tons (6,100 kg; 13,000 lb) load planned) and could be accessed by a clamshell rear cargo door that could be opened in flight to allow air-dropping of loads.

Development work and construction of the prototype was slow, and was further slowed down by the Revolución Libertadora of 1955 that overthrew the government of Juan Perón. While work restarted in 1958, the prototype only made its first flight to 9 December 1960. The IA 38 proved to be difficult to control, and was underpowered, giving a poor performance, while the engines also suffered from overheating. The prototype made three more test flights before the project was cancelled in 1962.

After the project was cancelled, the IA 38 was placed in the grounds of the Aeronautical School, where it was used as a static display until a fire (suspected to have been an act of arson) destroyed the aircraft's skin. The remains of the plane were scrapped afterwards.

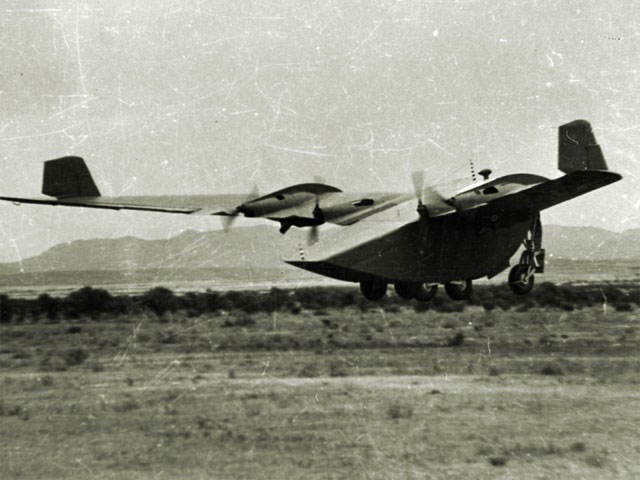
The prototype in flight

== Specifications (IA 38 - performance estimated) ==
Data from Jane's All The World's Aircraft 1961–62

General characteristics

- Crew: 2
- Length: 13.5 m (44 ft 3 in)
- Wingspan: 32.0 m (105 ft 0 in)
- Height: 4.60 m (15 ft 1 in)
- Wing area: 133 m^{2} (1,430 sq ft)
- Aspect ratio: 7.7:1
- Empty weight: 8,500 kg (18,739 lb)
- Gross weight: 16,000 kg (35,274 lb)
- Fuel capacity: 1,450 L (380 US gal; 320 imp gal)
- Powerplant: 4 × IA 16 El Gaucho radial engines

Performance

- Maximum speed: 252 km/h (157 mph, 136 kn)
- Cruise speed: 215 km/h (134 mph, 116 kn)
- Range: 1,250 km (780 mi, 670 nmi)
- Endurance: 5.6 hr
- Service ceiling: 4,500 m (14,800 ft)

== See also ==
Related lists

- List of tailless aircraft

== Bibliography ==
- Green, William & Swanborough, Gordon. "Horten Exotica...to the H IX and beyond." Air Enthusiast, No. 39, May–August 1989, pp. 1–18. ISSN 0143-5450.
- Magnusson, Michael. "FMA : from 1945: The story of Fabrica Militar de Aviones, Argentina: Part 8: Horten and other activities in the 1950s." Air-Britain Archive, Autumn 2009. pp. 127–130. ISSN 0262-4923.
- Pelletier, Alain J. "Towards the Ideal Aircraft: The Life and Times of the Flying Wing, Part Two". Air Enthusiast, No. 65, September–October 1996, pp. 8–19. ISSN 0143-5450.
- The Illustrated Encyclopedia of Aircraft (Part Work 1982-1985), 1985, Orbis Publishing
- Taylor, John W. R. Jane's All The World's Aircraft 1961–62. London: Sampson Low, Marston & Company, 1961.
