= Fu-hsing AP-1 =

Chinese trainer aircraft

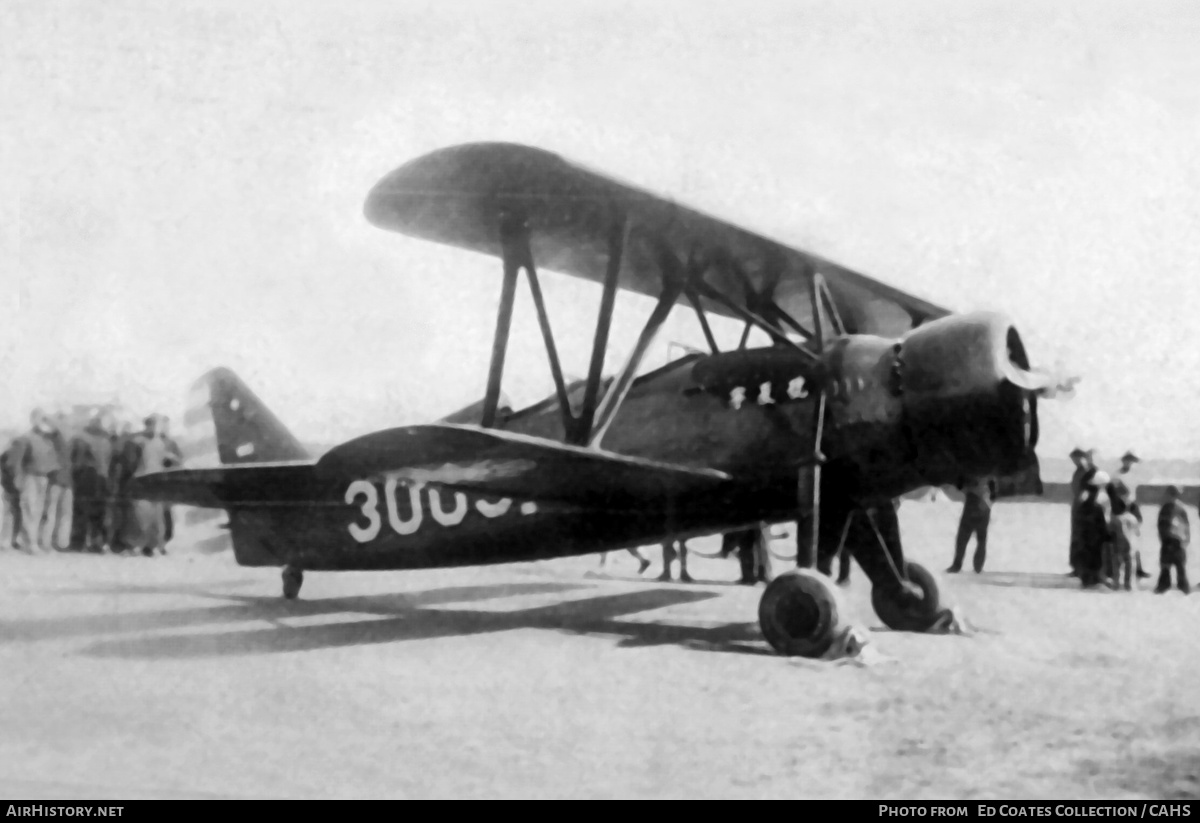

General information
- Role: trainer aircraft
- National origin: Republic of China
- Manufacturer: Shiukwan Aircraft Works
- Number built: 20

History
- First flight: 20 May 1936

The Fu-hsing AP-1 was a Chinese two-seat, single-engine trainer aircraft first flown in 1936.

== Development ==
Shiukwan Aircraft Works was established in 1935 under cooperation between the Guangdong government and Curtiss-Wright and the aircraft was developed by Chinese and American engineers based on the North American NA-16 and Stearman 76. The plane was first flown on 20 May 1936 and unveiled on 22 May in Guangzhou.

The initial production plans included ten advanced trainers and ten armed multi-purpose aircraft. In August 1936 they were changed to twenty advanced trainers, of which fifteen were to be fitted with camera and armament, yet only one was fitted with a camera. Production started in Guangdong and later continued in Kunming after the evacuation of the factory. Twenty AP-1s were built before the production run ended on 14 January 1941.

== Specifications ==
Data from The Aircrafts [sic] of Chinese Air Force in the Sino-Japan War [sic]

General characteristics

- Crew: 2
- Length: 7.25 m (23 ft 9 in)
- Wingspan: 9.45 m (31 ft 0 in)
- Height: 2.82 m (9 ft 3 in)
- Empty weight: 985 kg (2,172 lb)
- Gross weight: 1,634 kg (3,602 lb)
- Powerplant: 1 × Wright R-975E-3 Whirlwind nine-cylinder air-cooled radial engine, 340 kW (450 hp)

Performance

- Cruise speed: 172 km/h (107 mph, 93 kn)
- Range: 1,577 km (980 mi, 852 nmi)
- Service ceiling: 6,462 m (21,201 ft)

Armament

- Guns:
  - 2 × 7.62 mm machine gun (upper wing)
  - 1 × 7.62 mm machine gun (rear dorsal position)
- Bombs: 181 kg (399 lb)
