= Honduran Aviation Museum =

- Museo del Aire de Honduras
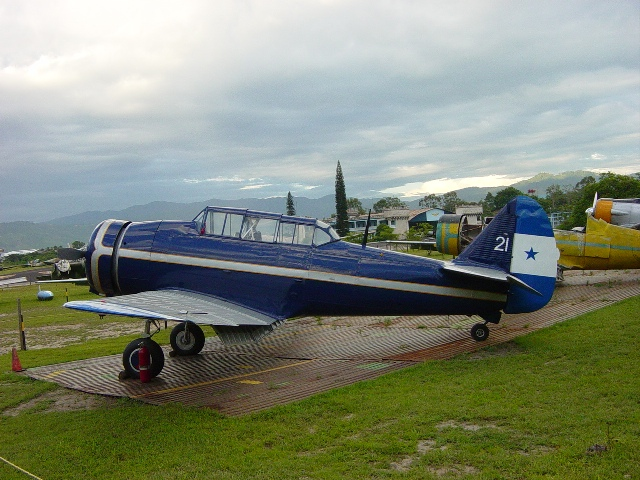
- A former Honduran Air Force North American NA-42 on display at the museum

- Location within Honduras
- Established: September 2002
- Location: Toncontín International Airport, Tegucigalpa, Honduras
- Coordinates: 14°3′12.78″N 87°12′58.73″W
- Type: Aviation museum
- Collection size: 25 aircraft plus other exhibits

The Honduran Aviation Museum, (Museo del Aire de Honduras), is a museum foundation in Honduras, opened in September 2002 for the purpose of storing, preserving, restoring and exhibiting items related to Honduran aviation.

== History ==
The museum originated from the Honduran Air Force (FAH), which had stored and preserved aircraft and exhibits from the 1930s, some of which remained airworthy into the 1980s, such as a North American NA-42, Vought F4U Corsair and a North American AT-6. In 1986 representatives of the National Air and Space Museum of the Smithsonian Institution, gave the Honduran public chats and conferences and realized that the Honduran Institute of Culture Interamericana-IHCI had the potential for creating a museum of national aviation, It is so the initiative gives his first steps inside the command and active personnel of her FAH which interfere to such a degree of founding and organizing the "Museum of the Air of Honduras" the second step was the disposition to donate 12 aircraft in the Officials' Club of the FAH at the end of the 80s what determines the second stage in road surface for the organization of so important project.

Later, in June, 2000 the first meeting with persons deepened formally into the project leads to the conclusion of a " Committee organizes Pro-museum of the Air ", summoned all for the Commander at the time colonel Gerardo E. Carvajal, And with participation of volunteers and other persons been interested in the aeronautical conservation of the historical heritage of the country. The committee presents and signs the document of Record of Constitution of the "Foundation Museum of the Aíre of Honduras" on August 30, 2000, in the facilities of the FAH sedate in the Airport Toncontín in the cardinal city of Tegucigalpa, M.D.C. the creation of the foundation it possesses the legal instruments of: Juridical Legal status with record Not. 102–2002; and, the Decree issued by the sovereign one National Congress of Honduras Down Not. 144–2003. The organized foundation has twenty-two volunteer members, most of whom in 2003 received museum training from the Francisco Morazán National Pedagogical University.

== Aircraft on display ==
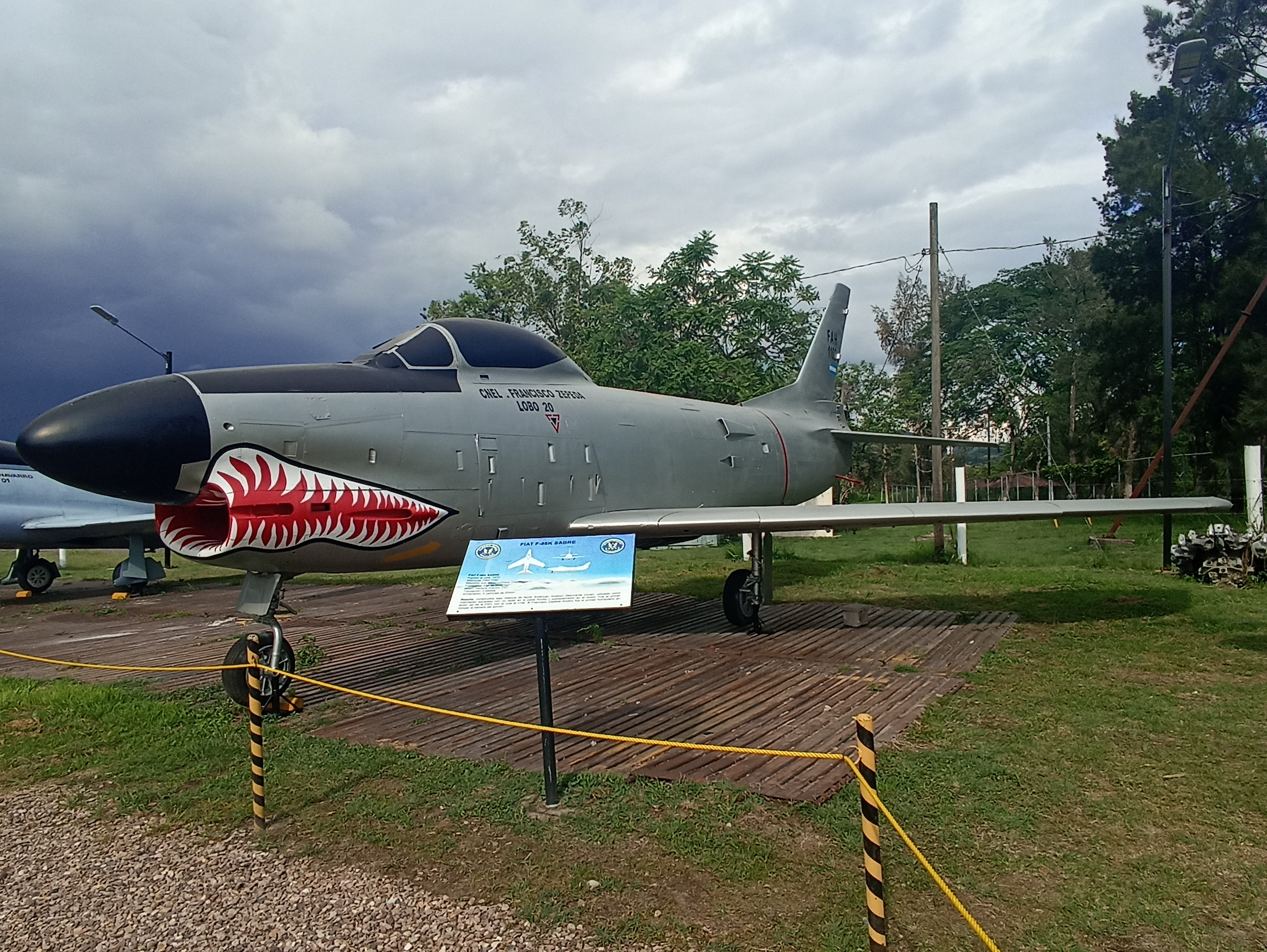
A former Honduran F-86K at the Honduran Aviation Museum

The foundation and museum has twenty-five aircraft which were transferred to the organization through Decree No. 144-2003 issued by the National Congress and through private donations. The aircraft mostly belonged to the Honduran Air Force and the rest were donated by private persons.

- Beechcraft AT-11 FAH-105
- Beechcraft Twin Bonanza
- Bell P-63E Kingcobra FAH-402
- Bell UH-1B Iroquois FAH-934
- Bell 47G-4 FAH-910
- Bristol F.2 Fighter H-9 (Replica)
- Canadair CL-13 Sabre Mk.4 FAH-3006
- Cessna T-41D Mescalero FAH-225
- Cessna U-17A Skywagon FAH-111
- Cessna A-37B Dragonfly FAH-1018
- Cessna 206 HR-IAD
- Cessna 337 Skymaster HR-HCM
- Curtiss C-46F Commando 44-78708
- Dassault Super Mystère B.2 FAH-2009
- Douglas C-47A FAH-306
- Douglas C-47B FAH-315
- Douglas DC-6 BuNo 152688
- Fiat F-86K Sabre FAH-1102
- Hughes TH-55A Osage FAH-917
- Lockheed T-33A FAH-1200
- North American AT-6C Texan FAH-205C
- North American NA-42 FAH-21
- North American T-28B Trojan FAH-230
- Stearman PT-17 FAH-46
- Vought F4U-5N Corsair FAH-609
- Vultee BT-13 FAH-60

== Irreplaceable pieces ==
The NA-42 at the museum is the only remaining aircraft of that type in the world and the oldest surviving aircraft from the T-6 family. The museum's Vought F4U-5N Corsair, serial number FAH-609, is well known for taking part in the last combat between piston engine fighters, during the Football War between El Salvador and Honduras in 1969. During the war it was flown by Fernando Soto Henríquez "The Weak Spot".

== Facilities ==
The area of the museum is of about five hectares of area located in the Air Honduran Force in Toncontín, Tegucigalpa, M.D.C. Hired by a term of hundred years with the State of Honduras and contract authorized by means of the Decree Not. 144-2003 issued by the National Congress. The infrastructure, it possesses a room of exhibitions and an outdoor exposure of the collection of the aircraft, besides appliances and historical pieces, photographs, documents, and some historical videos, the above-mentioned to being catalogued in the future project of Aeronautical File of Honduras, dependence to being created by the F.M.A.H. Office of the administration, a book-keeper, and other one of exhibition, maintenance and restoration of planes and integrated by technical personnel in specialized maintenance of planes. A shop found in Toncontín's international Airport and other one in the building of exhibitions in order to achieve economic self-sufficiency. The Aeronautical Park was opened the public in September 2002.

== Memberships of the museum ==
The Honduran Aviation Museum is part of the Latin American Society of Aviation Historians (LAAHS), the Ibero-American Federation of Air-Space Studies, and the Association of Aeronautical Museums of Latin America.
