= I.Ae. 16 El Gaucho =

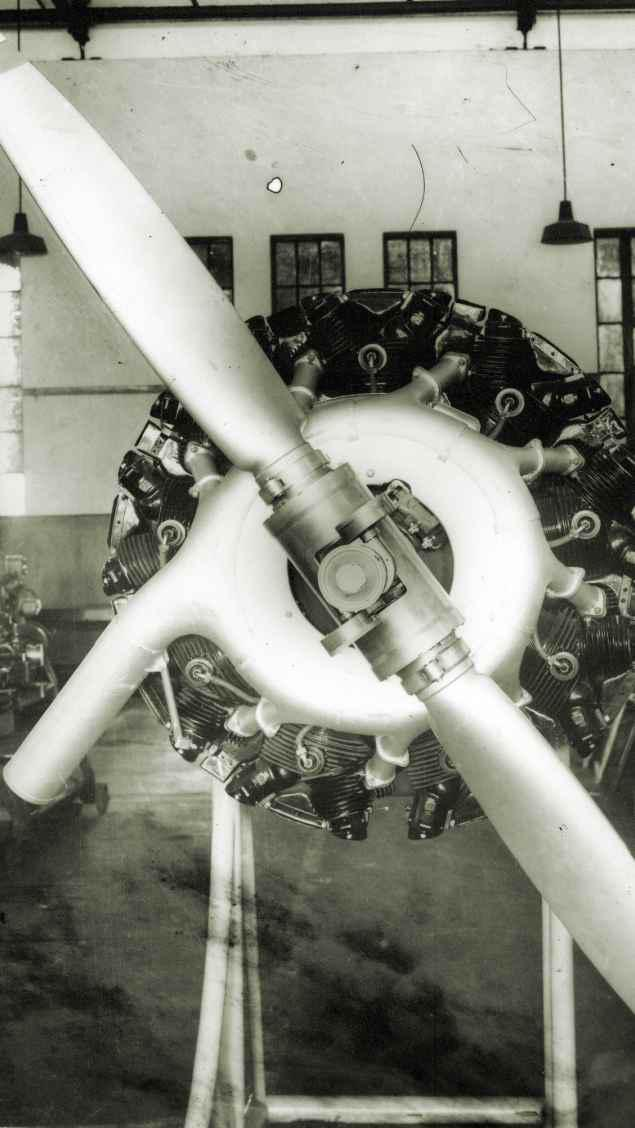
I.Ae. 16 "El Gaucho" engine and I.Ae. 2M-B-30 propeller.

The I.Ae. 16 "El Gaucho" is a nine-cylinder air-cooled radial aircraft engine, with a power of about 450 hp (336 kW). It was designed by the Aeronautic Institute (Instituto Aerotécnico, I.Ae.) of the Argentine Republic in 1943.

== Design and development ==
The goal of I.Ae. 16 was to design an engine in the intermediate power range to equip general purpose aircraft, both civilian and military, that would be built by the Military Aircraft Factory. Due to the difficulty of importing materials because of World War II, it was designed to use only materials that could be produced in Argentina.

It was based on the Wright J-6/R-975 Whirlwind 9 engine with a displacement of 15.9 liters and in the 300 to 390 hp (220 to 290 kW) power range.

Compared to the Wright J-6/R-975 Whirlwind 9 engine the I.Ae. 16 "El Gaucho" was around the same performance wise. However, it gained a poor reputation causing people to replace the engines with the Armstrong Siddeley Cheetah XXV.

The Motor and Automotive Factory developed a version of the Whirlwind using up-to-date technologies that allowed it to provide a power of 450 hp (340 kW).

== Production ==
There were a number of problems caused by its lack of experience, materials, and tools. This created difficulties in creating high quality metals with the required thermodynamic performance. About 300 units were produced.

== Applications ==
- I.Ae. 22 DL Advanced trainer
- DINFIA IA 38 Experimental tailless transport aircraft
