= I.Ae. 22 DL =

I.Ae. D.L. 22 Dele Dele
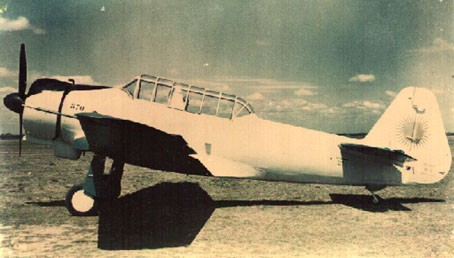
- Side view of an I.Ae. 22 DL

General information
- Type: Advanced trainer
- National origin: Argentina
- Manufacturer: Instituto Aerotécnico
- Status: Retired
- Primary users: Argentine Air Force Argentine Navy
- Number built: 201

History
- First flight: 8 August 1944
- Developed from: I.Ae. 21 DL

The I.Ae. 22 DL was an Argentine advanced training aircraft designed by the Instituto Aerotécnico (AeroTechnical Institute) in 1943. It had a wooden structure which resembled the North American NA-16.

== Development ==
The I.Ae. 22 DL was a development of the I.Ae. D.L. 21, which was itself developed from the North American NA-16, which was also in service with the Argentine military at that time.

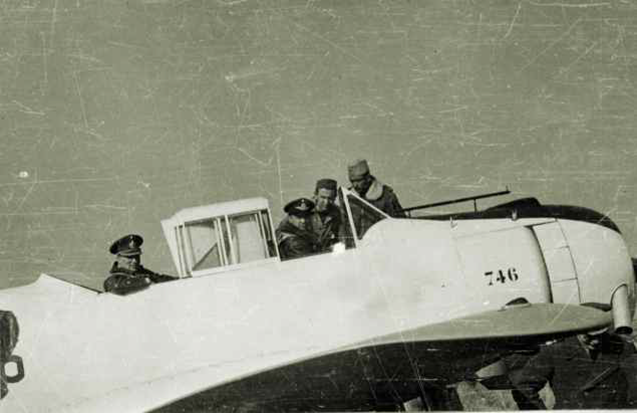
Juan Perón flew over Córdoba in the I.Ae.22 "DL" prototype, 1944.

Argentine experience with the NA-16-4P and deteriorating political relations with the US led to the local development of the I.Ae. D.L. 21, which shared the NA-16 fuselage structure. However it proved too difficult to produce and an entirely new design (the I.Ae. D.L. 22) of similar configuration, but structurally different and optimized to available materials was built instead.

It had a wooden structure and a nine-cylinder 450 horsepower (340 kW) I.Ae. 16 El Gaucho radial engine with a Hamilton Standard 2M-D-30 metallic propeller.

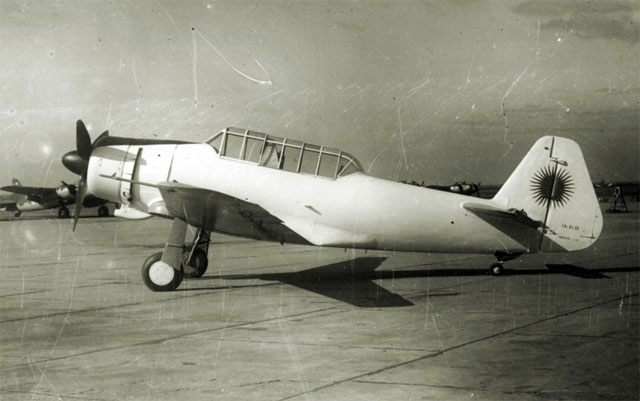
I.Ae.22C DL, with Armstrong Siddeley Cheetah 25 engine and 3-blade Rotol propeller

The prototype flew on 8 August 1944. (Note: Some sources give 14 May 1944 as the day of the first flight.) Approximately 200 aircraft were built. A version with a 475 horsepower (354 kW) Armstrong Siddeley Cheetah 25 radial engine and a Rotol constant speed propeller was designated I.Ae. 22-C.

== Operators ==
Argentina

- Argentine Air Force
- Argentine Naval Aviation

== Surviving aircraft ==
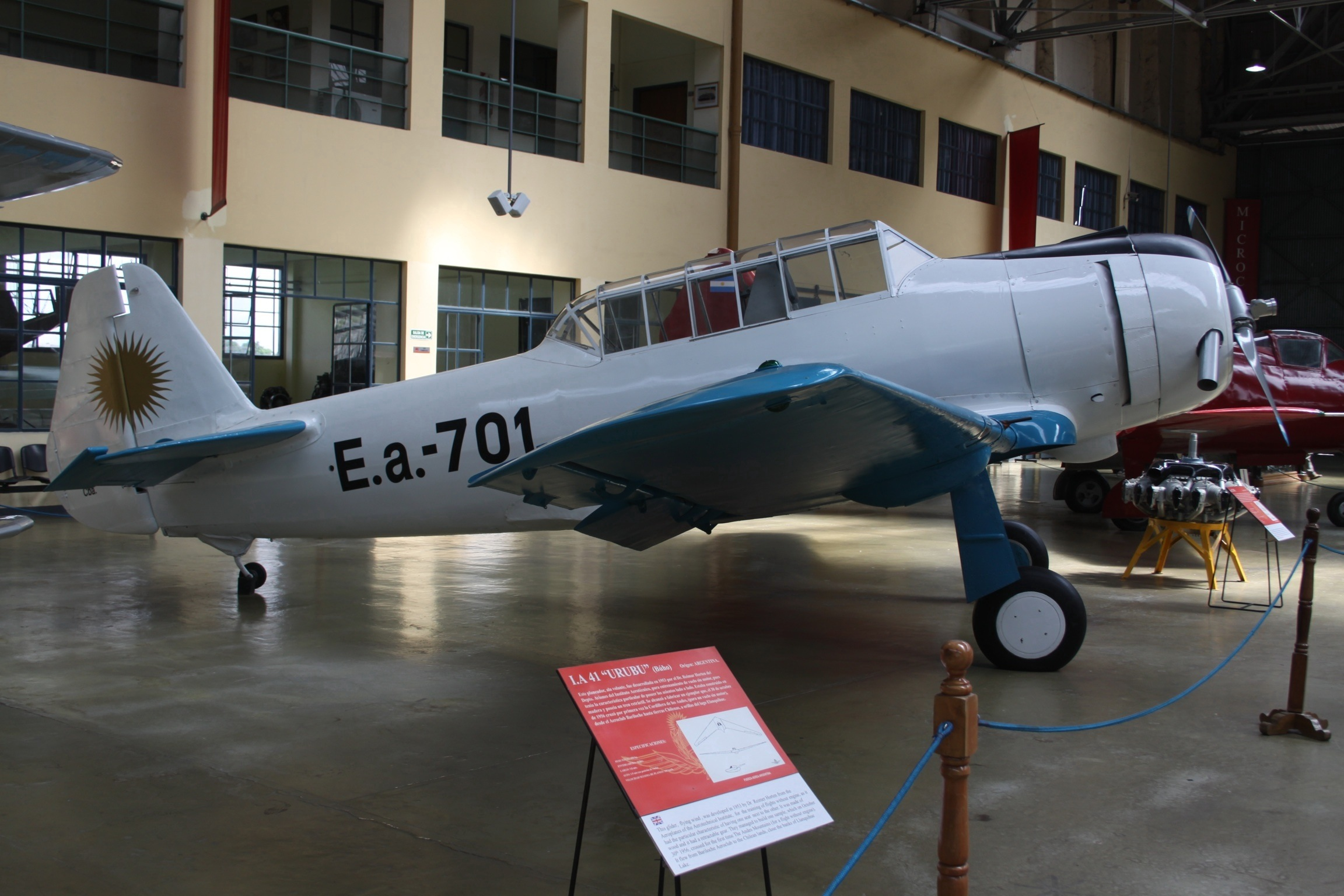
Restored I.Ae.22DL, Museo Nacional de Aeronáutica, Argentina

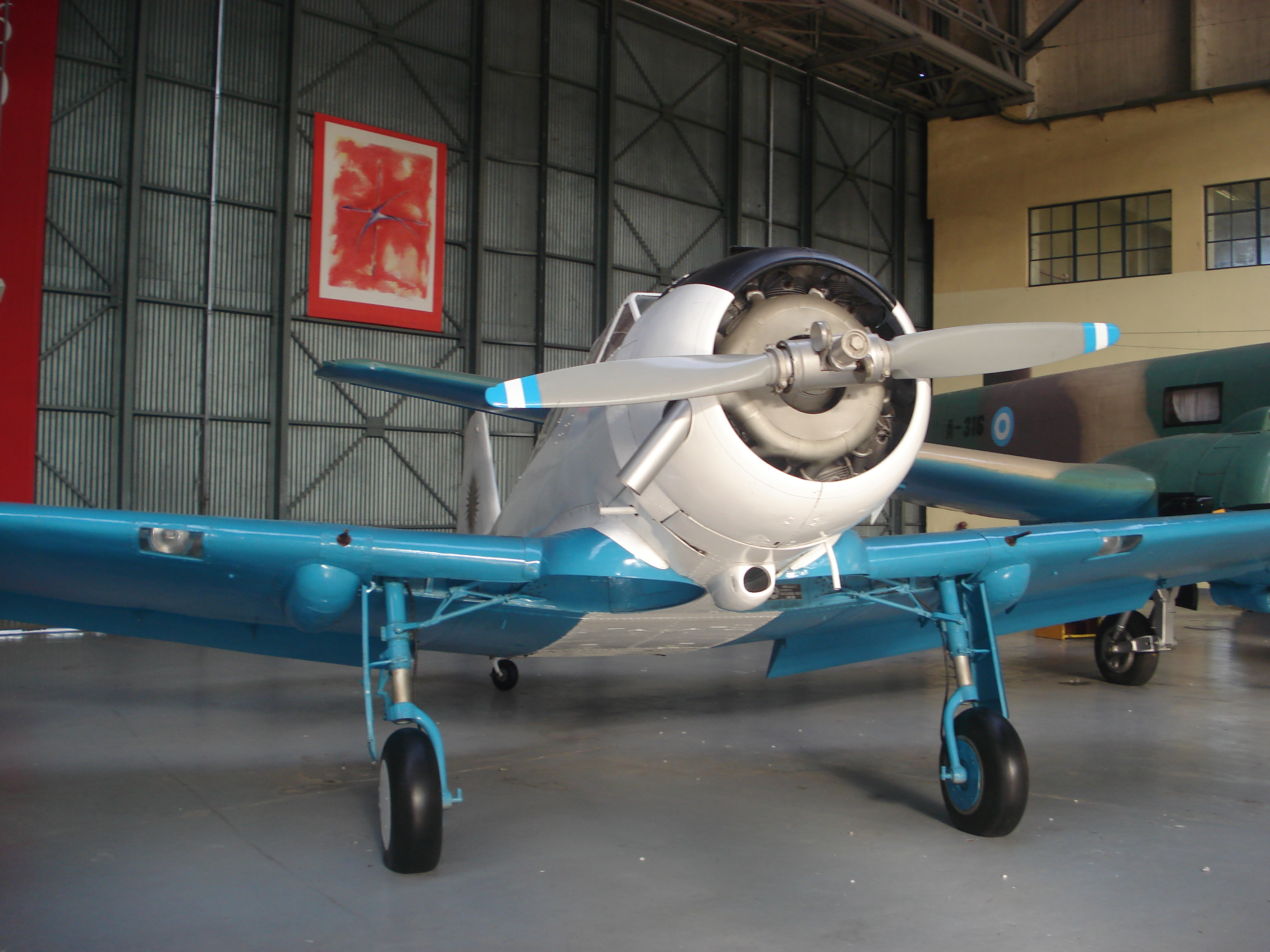
Front view of the I.A.e 22 DL preserved at Museo Nacional de Aeronáutica.

- A restored example, constructor number 728, is on display marked as Ea-701 at the Museo Nacional de Aeronáutica de Argentina.

== Specifications (I.Ae.22 DL) ==
Data from Jane's all the World's Aircraft 1947

General characteristics

- Crew: two
- Length: 9.2 m (30 ft 2 in)
- Wingspan: 12.6 m (41 ft 4 in)
- Height: 2.82 m (9 ft 3 in)
- Wing area: 23.19 m^{2} (249.6 sq ft)
- Empty weight: 1,520 kg (3,351 lb)
- Gross weight: 2,220 kg (4,894 lb)
- Powerplant: 1 × I.Ae. 16 El Gaucho 9-cyl. air-cooled radial piston engine, 340 kW (450 hp)
- Propellers: 2-bladed Hamilton Standard 2M-D-30

Performance

- Maximum speed: 290 km/h (180 mph, 160 kn) at 450 m (1,476 ft)
- Cruise speed: 260 km/h (160 mph, 140 kn)
- Range: 1,100 km (680 mi, 590 nmi)
- Endurance: 4 hours 15 minutes
- Service ceiling: 5,200 m (17,100 ft)
- Wing loading: 96 kg/m^{2} (20 lb/sq ft)
- Power/mass: 0.141 kW/kg (0.086 hp/lb)

Armament

- Guns: 2 x 7,65 mm fixed Madsen machine guns (450 rounds each)
- Rockets: or 6 x 11 kg (24 lb) rockets.
- Bombs: 3 x 50 kg (110 lb) or 9 x 15 kg (33 lb) bombs

== See also ==
Related development

- North American NA-16
- I.Ae. 21 DL

Aircraft of comparable role, configuration, and era

- Fiat G.49
- Kyushu K10W
- Piaggio P.150
- Soko 522

Related lists

- List of aircraft of the Argentine Air Force
- List of aircraft of Argentine Naval Aviation

== Bibliography ==
- Arreguez, Ángel César (2008). Fábrica militar de aviones: crónicas y testimonios (in Spanish). Córdoba, Argentina: Ministerio de Ciencia y Tecnología de la Provincia de Córdoba. ISBN 978-987-24620-0-0.
- Burgos, Antonio C. "Los 75 años de la Fábrica Militar de Aviones"(in Spanish). aeroespacio.com. Retrieved: 15 October 2009.
- "Fabrica Militar de Aviones" (in Spanish). Aerospacio, Buenos Aires, 1977. Article on the 50th anniversary of the "Fabrica Militar de Aviones" listing all the aircraft developed and manufactured there since 1927.
- von Rauch, Georg; Veres, David L. (March 1983). "Argentina's Wooden Warriors". Air Classics. Vol. 19, no. 3. Challenge Publications. pp. 14–21.
