= I.Ae. 21 DL =

Experimental Argentinian training aircraft

FMA 21
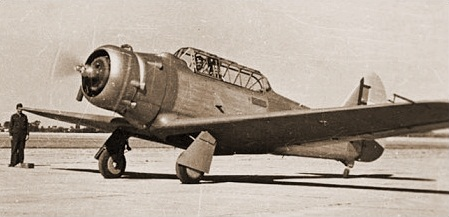
- The I.Ae. 21

General information
- Type: Military trainer aircraft
- National origin: Argentina
- Manufacturer: Fábrica Militar de Aviones
- Status: Retired
- Primary user: Argentine Air Force
- Number built: 1

History
- First flight: 14 May 1943
- In service: 1943-45
- Developed from: North American NA-16
- Developed into: I.Ae. 22 DL

The I.Ae. 21 DL, also known as the FMA I.A.21 or FMA 21, was an experimental training aircraft developed by Argentina during the Second World War. While only one was built due to material constraints, the FMA 21 served as an advanced training aircraft for the Argentine Air Force (FAA) from 1943 to 1945.

The FMA 21 was developed by Argentinian government-owned aircraft manufacturer Fábrica Militar de Aviones (FMA). Due to souring political relations between Argentina and the United States, FMA decided to use their experience with the North American NA-16 in service with the FAA to develop their own domestic fighter, so the FMA 21 was heavily based on the fuselage of the NA-16. It was also featured the first retractable landing gear built in the country.

== Construction ==
The FMA 21's fuselage consisted of welded chrome-molybdenum steel tubes covered in a duraluminium coating. The cockpit had a sliding all-acrylic canopy and was configured for tandem control.

The aircraft was propelled by a Wright R-975-E3 Whirlwind that generated 450 hp at 2250 r.p.m and drove a two-bladed variable-pitch propeller.

== See also ==
Related development

- North American NA-16
- I.Ae. 22 DL

Aircraft of comparable role, configuration, and era

- CAC Wackett
- Curtiss-Wright SNC
- Fleet 60 Fort
- Kyushu K10W
- Miles Master
- VL Pyry
- Vultee BT-13 Valiant

Related lists

- List of aircraft of the Argentine Air Force
- List of aircraft of Argentine Naval Aviation
