= Horten H.VIII =

Part-built WWII flying wing aircraft

H.VIII

General information
- Type: Flying wind tunnel research aircraft
- National origin: Germany
- Manufacturer: Horten
- Designer: Reimar Horten
- Status: Unfinished
- Number built: none

History
- First flight: none

The Horten H.VIII was a flying wing research aircraft designed by Reimar Horten during World War II and only partly built by the end of the war.

== Design ==
The H.VIII was conceived in 1943 as a flying wind tunnel, as Horten himself was denied access to the existing facilities. Following his usual swept and tapered flying wing pattern, a large open-ended test chamber was fitted beneath the centre section. Horten intended to test items such as laminar-flow aerofoils and those from other aircraft types, as well as jet engine intakes, at intermediate speeds of up to 300 kilometres per hour (190 mph).

It was to be powered by six Argus As 10 176 kilowatts (236 hp) engines driving pusher propellers.

Construction was of mixed wood and metal. Horten had difficulties in obtaining timbers of sufficient quality and length, and the site was overrun by the Allies before the airframe could be finished.

== Specifications (H.VIII) ==
Data from Lee (2020)

General characteristics

- Crew: 3
- Capacity: 1 test piece
- Length: 16.5 m (54 ft 2 in) nose to wing-tips
- Wingspan: 40 m (131 ft 3 in)
- Height: 3.85 m (12 ft 8 in)
- Wing area: 146 m^{2} (1,570 sq ft)
- Aspect ratio: 11
- Empty weight: 5,000 kg (11,023 lb)
- Max takeoff weight: 8,000 kg (17,637 lb)
- Powerplant: 6 × Argus As 10 piston engine, 176 kW (236 hp) each

Performance

- Maximum speed: 280 km/h (170 mph, 150 kn)
- Cruise speed: 250 km/h (160 mph, 130 kn)
- Stall speed: 80 km/h (50 mph, 43 kn)
- Never exceed speed: 430 km/h (270 mph, 230 kn)
- Minimum control speed: 80 km/h (50 mph, 43 kn)
- Range: 6,000 km (3,728 mi, 3,240 nmi)
