= North American A-27 =

Attack aircraft model by North American Aviation

A-27
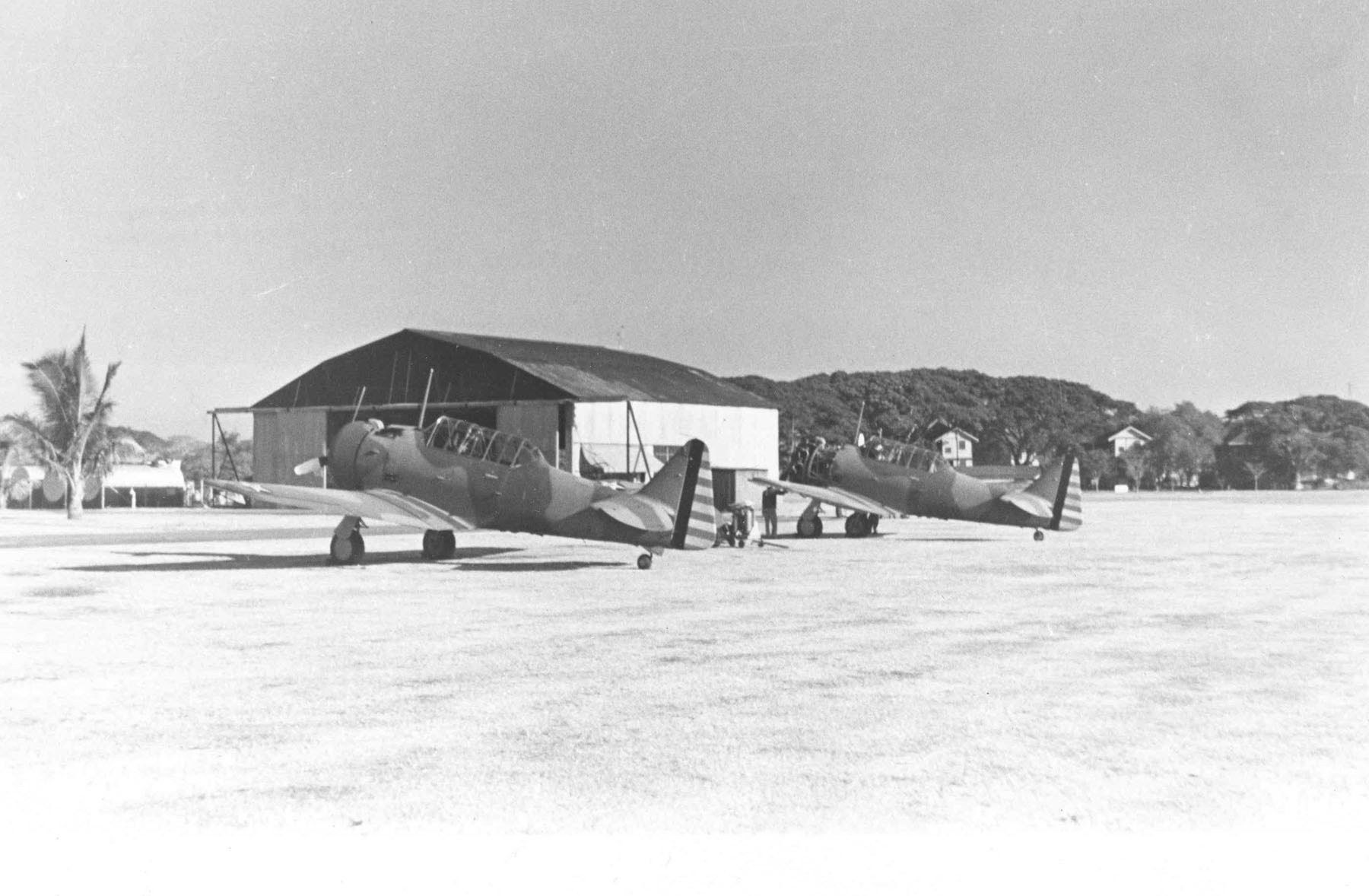
- Two A-27s of the 17th Pursuit Squadron at Nichols Field, Philippines, in 1941.

General information
- Type: Ground attack
- National origin: United States
- Manufacturer: North American Aviation
- Primary user: United States Army Air Corps
- Number built: 10

History
- First flight: June 1940
- Developed from: North American T-6 Texan

The North American Aviation A-27 is an attack version of the North American T-6 Texan. Ten aircraft were ordered by Thailand as NA-69 light attack aircraft.

Instead of being delivered to Thailand, the aircraft were taken over in October 1940 by the United States Army Air Corps (USAAC) to keep them out of Japanese hands and redesignated A-27 under the USAAC aircraft designation system. Assigned to Nichols Field in the Philippines and used as a trainer, all A-27s were destroyed within a month during the Japanese invasion of that country during World War II.

== Operators ==
United States

- United States Army Air Corps
  - 4th Composite Group, Nichols Field, Luzon, Philippines
    - 3rd Pursuit Squadron - 1941
    - 17th Pursuit Squadron - 1941
    - 20th Pursuit Squadron - 1941

Thailand

== Specifications (A-27) ==
Data from Letedla 39–45: North American A-27

General characteristics

- Crew: 2
- Length: 29 ft 0 in (8.85 m)
- Wingspan: 41 ft 10 in (12.75 m)
- Height: 12 ft 4 in (3.75 m)
- Wing area: 258.3 sq ft (24.00 m^{2})
- Empty weight: 4,850 lb (2,200 kg)
- Max takeoff weight: 6,790 lb (3,080 kg)
- Powerplant: 1 × Wright R-1820-F53 Radial, 745 hp (556 kW)

Performance

- Maximum speed: 252 mph (405 km/h, 219 kn)
- Cruise speed: 221 mph (355 km/h, 192 kn)
- Range: 575 mi (925 km, 499 nmi)
- Service ceiling: 25,600 ft (7,800 m)

Armament

- Guns: 2 x nose-mounted 30 caliber M1919 Browning machine guns and 1 x rear-mounted 30 caliber machine gun
- Bombs: 400 lb bombs on underwing racks

== See also ==
Related development

- North American NA-16
- North American P-64
- North American T-6 Texan

Aircraft of comparable role, configuration, and era

- CAC Wirraway

Related lists

- List of military aircraft of the United States

== Bibliography ==
- Balous, Miroslav (2004). "Letedla 39–45: North American A-27". Letectví + Kosmonautika (in Czech). No. 2. pp. 132–133. ISSN 0024-1156.
- Hagedorn, Dan (2009). North American's T-6: A Definitive History of the World's Most Famous Trainer. North Branch, Minnesota: Specialty Press. ISBN 978-1-58007-124-6.
- Johnson, E. R. (2008). American Attack Aircraft Since 1926. Jefferson, North Carolina, US: McFarland & Company, Inc., Publishers. ISBN 978-0-7864-3464-0.
