= North American P-64 =

American fighter aircraft

NA-50, NA-68/P-64
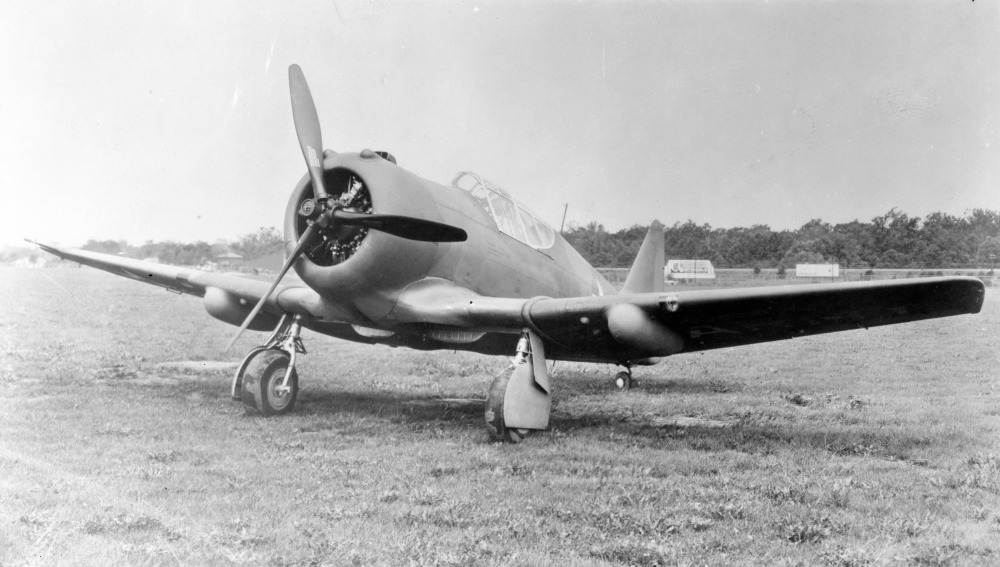
- North American P-64

General information
- Type: Fighter
- Manufacturer: North American Aviation
- Primary users: Peruvian Air Force United States Army Air Forces
- Number built: 13

History
- First flight: May 1939 (NA-50); 1 September 1940 (NA-68)
- Retired: 1950 (Peru)
- Developed from: North American NA-16

The North American P-64 was the designation assigned by the United States Army Air Corps (USAAC) to the North American Aviation NA-68 fighter, an upgraded variant of the NA-50 developed during the late 1930s. It was designed as a low-cost fighter for the export market. Seven NA-50s were purchased by the Peruvian Air Force, which nicknamed it Torito ("Little Bull").

Six NA-68s ordered by the Royal Thai Air Force were seized before export by the US government in 1941, after the Franco-Thai War and growing ties between Thailand and the Empire of Japan. These aircraft were used by the USAAC as unarmed fighter trainers.

The Peruvian NA-50s subsequently saw action during the Ecuadorian–Peruvian War of 1941.

== Design and development ==
=== NA-50 ===
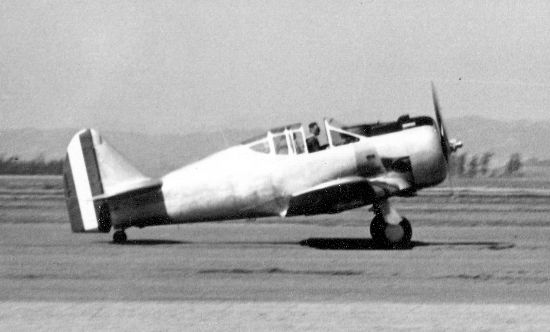
NA-50 "Torito" destined for Peruvian service

The North American Aviation NA-50 was developed as a simple single-seat, low-wing, single-engined fighter for export. The design was developed from the NA-16/BT-9 basic training aircraft of 1935. The NA-16 evolved into a series of aircraft that were some of the most widely used advanced and basic training aircraft produced by any country, and provided the basic design for a single-engined fighter intended for small countries that needed a simple aircraft with modern capabilities and features.

The NA-50 Torito (Spanish slang for "little bull"), built for Peru, was a single-seat fighter design based on the two-seat Basic Combat Demonstrator NA-44. The NA-50 was powered by an 840 hp (626 kW) Wright R-1820-G3 radial air-cooled engine that gave the NA-50 a top speed of 295 mph (475 km/h) at 9,500 ft (2,900 m). It was armed with two .30 in (7.62 mm) M1919 Browning machine guns. The aircraft were manufactured in May 1939, and test-flown at the factory.

=== NA-68 ===
In 1940, the Royal Thai Air Force ordered six aircraft similar to the NA-50 that were designated NA-68. The changes in the NA-68 included a modified landing gear, new outer wings, heavier armament, and redesigned tail surfaces similar to those adopted on later production trainers. North American test pilot Lewis Waite flew the first NA-68 on 1 September 1940.

== Operational history ==
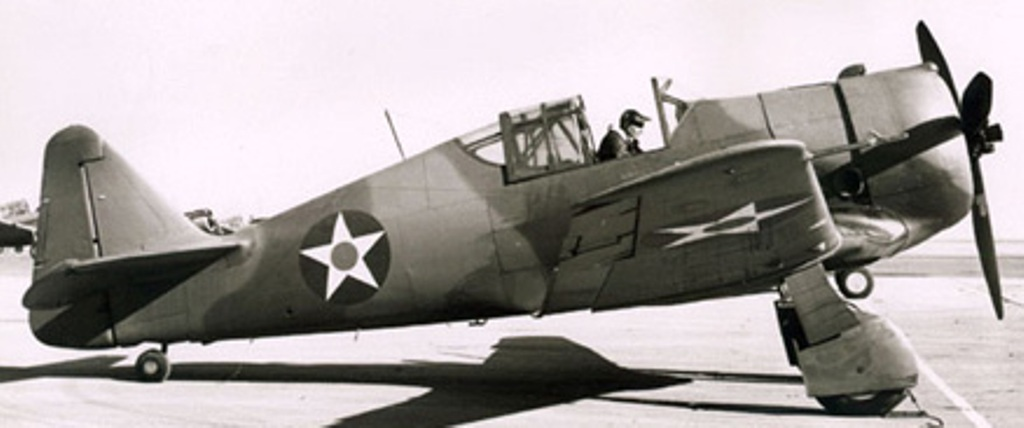
USAAC P-64

Peru purchased seven aircraft for the Peruvian Air Force, with deliveries completed in May 1939. In Peruvian service, these aircraft were fitted with bomb racks under the fuselage for light bombs. The Peruvian NA-50s took part in the Ecuadorian–Peruvian War of July 1941, supporting Army of Peru ground forces.

In 1940, the NA-68s (along with a parallel order for NA-69 two seaters) ordered by the Royal Thai Air Force were en route to Thailand when their export clearance was canceled and were returned to the United States where they were assigned the designation P-64, disarmed, and used for advanced fighter training by the USAAC, primarily at Luke Field in Arizona. They were later re-designated RP-64 ("R" for "Restricted").

== Operators ==
Peru

- Peruvian Air Force

United States

- United States Army Air Corps/United States Army Air Forces

== Surviving aircraft ==
- NA-50 XXI-41-4 (c/n 50-951). The sole surviving NA-50 is currently under restoration at Las Palmas Air Base, Lima, Peru, with it being planned that the aircraft be restored to flying by 2021. The aircraft remained in service until 1961 and was then displayed on a pedestal next to the Mausoleum of Captain José Quiñones Gonzales, (a Peruvian national hero who died flying an NA-50), until 2018, when it was removed for restoration.
- NA-68A 41-19085 (c/n 68-3061). One of the six intercepted Thailand-bound P-64s which survived being used for training and liaison was obtained by the Experimental Aircraft Association in the 1960s, and was used by EAA founder and president Paul Poberezny to perform an aerobatic display as part of the organization's annual fly-in. It was retired from flight after 1988 and placed on display at the EAA Aviation Museum. This aircraft has since been restored to flying condition, with the engine running again in 2013, followed by its first flying appearance at the 2016 EAA AirVenture Oshkosh airshow.

== Specifications (NA-68/P-64) ==
Data from The American Fighter

General characteristics

- Crew: 1
- Length: 27 ft 0 in (8.23 m)
- Wingspan: 37 ft 3 in (11.35 m)
- Height: 9 ft 0 in (2.74 m)
- Wing area: 228 sq ft (21.2 m^{2})
- Empty weight: 4,660 lb (2,114 kg)
- Gross weight: 5,990 lb (2,717 kg)
- Max takeoff weight: 6,800 lb (3,084 kg)
- Fuel capacity: 170 US gal (140 imp gal; 640 L)
- Powerplant: 1 × Wright R-1820-77 nine-cylinder air-cooled radial engine, 870 hp (650 kW)

Performance

- Maximum speed: 270 mph (430 km/h, 230 kn) at 8,700 ft (2,700 m)
- Cruise speed: 235 mph (378 km/h, 204 kn)
- Range: 630 mi (1,010 km, 550 nmi)
- Service ceiling: 27,500 ft (8,400 m)

Armament

- Guns:
  - 2 × .30 in (7.62 mm) machine guns
  - 2 × 20 mm cannons (Located in pods beneath each wing)
- Bombs: 750 lb (340 kg) bombs

== See also ==
Related development

- North American NA-16
- North American A-27
- North American T-6 Texan
- CAC Boomerang – an Australian fighter based on a license-built variant of the NA-16 (CAC Wirraway)

Aircraft of comparable role, configuration, and era

- Brewster F2A Buffalo
- Curtiss P-36 Hawk
- PZL.50 Jastrząb
- Polikarpov I-180
- Republic P-43 Lancer

Related lists

- List of military aircraft of the United States
- List of aircraft of World War II
