= North American NA-16 =

American single-engined trainer aircraft

NA-16/BT-9/NJ-1 Harvard I/NA-57/Sk 14
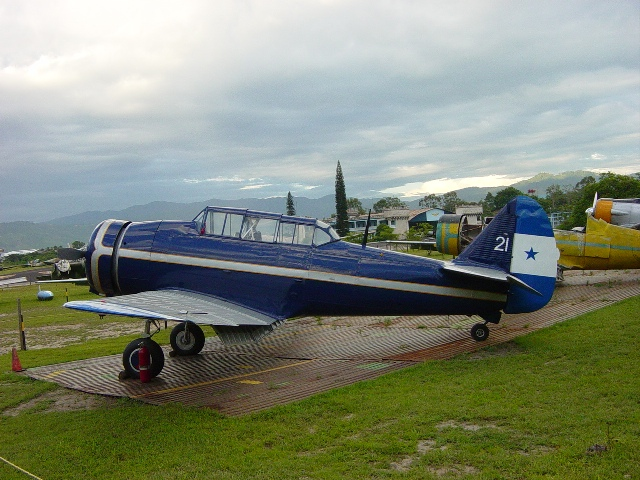
- NA-16-2A/NA-42 "FAH-21" displayed outside at the Honduras Air Museum at Toncontín

General information
- Type: Trainer
- Manufacturer: North American Aviation
- Status: retired
- Primary users: United States Army Air Corps Royal Australian Air Force; Swedish Air Force; French Air Force
- Number built: 1,935

History
- Manufactured: 1935 to 1939
- First flight: 1 April 1935
- Variants: North American BT-9; CAC Wirraway; I.Ae. 21 DL
- Developed into: North American T-6 Texan; North American P-64

The North American Aviation NA-16 is the first trainer aircraft built by North American Aviation, and was the beginning of a line of closely related North American trainer aircraft that would eventually number more than 17,000 examples, notably the T-6 Texan family.

== Design and development ==
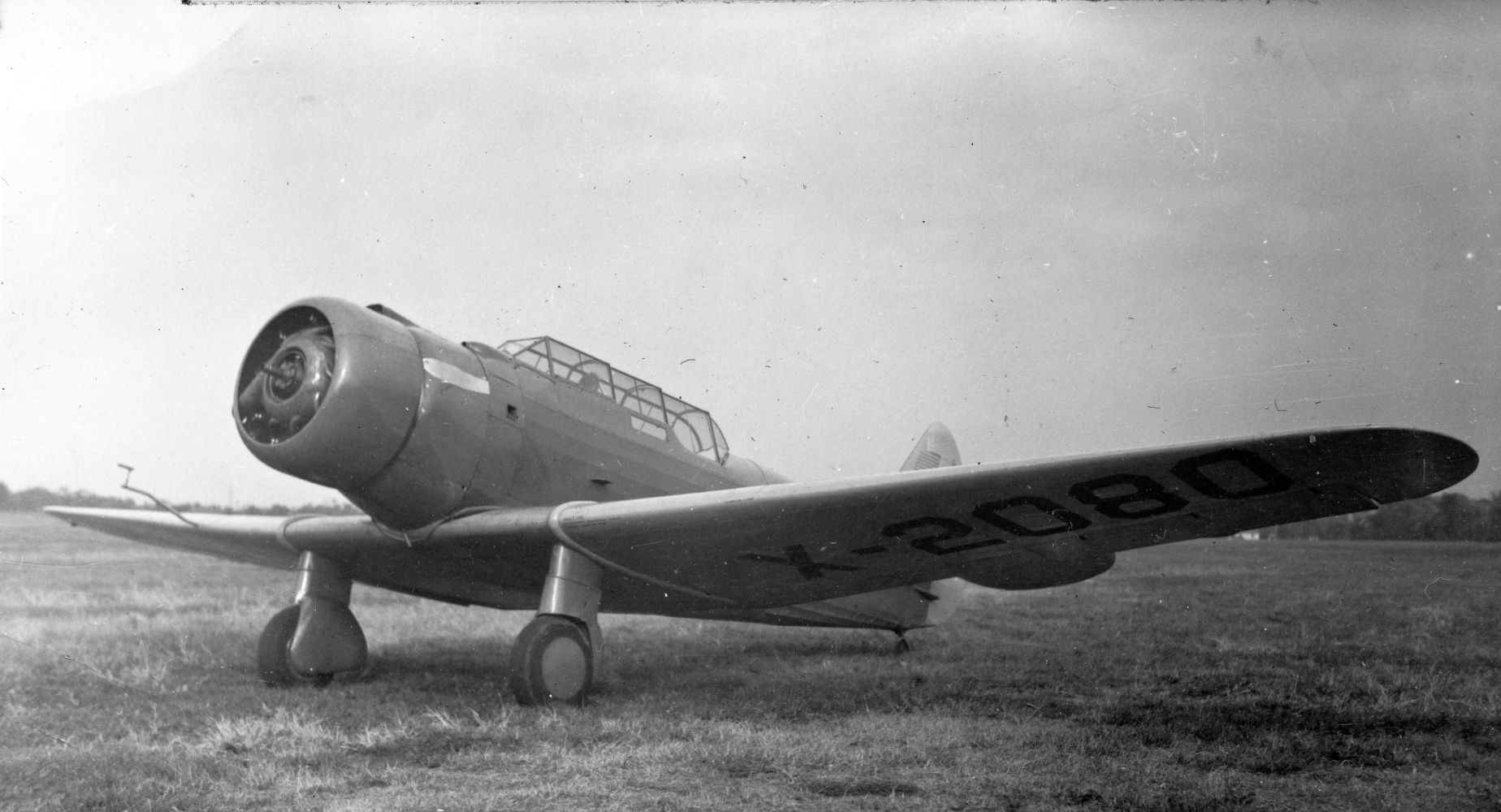
First NA-16 with initial canopy and still in civilian registration

On 10 December 1934, James Howard "Dutch" Kindelberger, John L. "Lee" Atwood, and H.R. Raynor sketched out the specifications for the NA-16. A key characteristic for the advanced trainer was a closed canopy.

The NA-16 is a family of related single-engine, low-wing monoplanes with tandem seating. Variants could have an open cockpit (the prototype and the NA-22) or be under a glass greenhouse that covered both cockpits. On some variants, the rear of the canopy could be opened for a gunner to fire to the rear. A variety of air-cooled radial engines, including the Wright Whirlwind, Pratt & Whitney Wasp and Pratt & Whitney Wasp Junior of varying horsepowers, could be installed depending on customer preferences. The fuselage was built up from steel tubes and normally fabric covered; however, later versions were provided with aluminum monocoque structures.

During the development of the design, a six-inch stretch was made by moving the rudder post aft. Many versions had a fixed landing gear, but later versions could have retractable gear, mounted in a widened wing center section (which could have either integral fuel tanks or not). Most had a straight trailing edge on the outer wing while again, some had the wing trailing edge swept forward slightly in an attempt to fix a problem with stalls and spins. Several different rudders were used, with early examples having a round outline, intermediate examples having a square bottom on the rudder (Harvard I) and late examples using the triangular rudder of the AT-6 series, due to a loss of control at high angles of attack with the early types. Horizontal and vertical tails were initially covered in corrugated aluminum, but later examples were smooth-skinned, and the horizontal stabilizer was increased in chord near its tips on later versions.

The NA-16 flew for the first time on 1 April 1935, by Eddie Allen. An enclosed cockpit version of the NA-16 was submitted to the United States Army Air Corps for performance tests as a basic trainer on 27 May 1935. The Army accepted the trainer for production but with some detail changes, including a larger engine and faired landing gear modifications. The modified NA-16 was redesignated by North American as the NA-18, with production examples entering Air Corps service as the North American BT-9 (NA-19). The U.S. Army Air Corps ordered 42 BT-9s, equipped with the Wright R-975 Whirlwind engine, and 40 BT-9As, which could be armed with .30 cal. Browning M-1 machine guns. In 1936, an order was placed for 117 BT-9Bs, without armament. A total of 67 BT-9Cs (NA-29) were built, using the same R-975-7 engine. Similar aircraft continued to be sold outside the U.S. under the NA-16 designation.

By the time of the U.S. entry into WWII, the NAF had built 1631 N-16 series aircraft. Of that total, 1043 were for foreign countries, while the remainder were for the U.S. Army Air Corps and Navy.

=== Foreign developments ===
Australia

The Commonwealth Aircraft Corporation produced 755 units of a modified version of the NA-16-2K (NA-33) known there as the Wirraway between 1939 and 1946. The units built included 40 CA-1s (Wirraway I), 60 CA-3s, 32 CA-5s, 100 CA-7s, 200 CA-8s, 188 CA-9s, and 135 CA-16s. The CA-16s were called the Wirraway IIIs, while previous models were called Wirraway IIs.

Argentina

Experience with the NA-16-4P and deteriorating political relations with the US led to the local development of the I.Ae. D.L. 21, which shared the NA-16 fuselage structure; however it proved too difficult to produce. As a result of this, an entirely new design (the I.Ae. D.L. 22) was built instead; it had similar configuration, but was structurally different and optimized to available materials.

Japan

The NA-16-4RW and NA-16-4R inspired the development of the Kyushu K10W when the Imperial Japanese Navy instructed Kyushu to develop something similar. The resulting aircraft owed little to the NA-16, however Allied Intelligence saw so few examples that the error was not corrected and some drawings show a modified NA-16.

== Variants ==
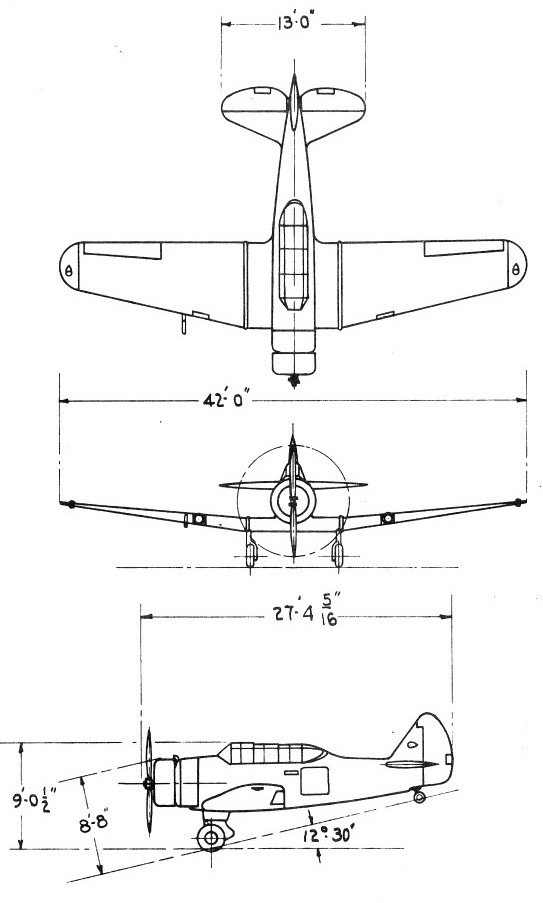
North American BT-9

Listing includes aircraft built specifically under NA-16 designation for export, and similar aircraft built for use by the United States armed forces.

NA-16
One for United States Army Air Corps (USAAC) (trials) developed into NA-18 and BT-9 series.
powered by Wright R-975 Whirlwind

When the North American NA-16 was first conceived, five different roles were intended for the design, designated NA-16-1 thru NA-16-5:

NA-16-1
General purpose two-seat aircraft - which became the Harvard I
NA-16-2K
Two-seat fighter - produced under licence in Australia as the CAC Wirraway.
NA-16-3
Two-seat light attack bomber. The first aircraft in this category was the retractable gear NA-26 which evolved into the NA-36 (BC-1). The fabric-covered fuselage was replaced by an all-metal monocoque to create the NA-44, which provided the basis for a line of light attack bombers whose improvements would result in the AT-6.
NA-16-4
Advanced trainer - became the BT-9 for the USAAC and which provided the bulk of early production. The improvement of the BT-9 with a longer metal skinned fuselage as on the NA-44 would create the NA-64 (Yale) and improved wings would result in the BT-14.
NA-16-5
Single-seat fighter - although this designation was never used, it became the NA-50 for Peru, and later the NA-68, which saw limited USAAF service as the P-64.

BT-9 (NA-19)
42 built for USAAC - Minor changes from NA-18, new canopy
powered by Wright R-975 Whirlwind

BT-9A (NA-19A)
40 built for USAAC - Armed BT-9 with one cowl gun, one rear flexible gun and modified canopy.
powered by Wright R-975 Whirlwind

NA-16-2H (NA-20)
One built for trials, sold to Honduras (FAH)
powered by Wright R-975 Whirlwind

NA-22
One built for USAAC trials but rejected as severely underpowered. Open cockpits as per early NA-16 and Townend ring on engine.
powered by Wright R-760 Whirlwind

BT-9B (NA-23)
117 built for USAAC - Unarmed with fixed rear on canopy.
powered by Wright R-975 Whirlwind

BT-9D (NA-23)
One modified BT-9B for USAAC - BT-14 prototype with new outer wings, Harvard type canopy, lengthened fabric covered fuselage, triangular rudder and detail alterations.
powered by Pratt & Whitney R-985 Wasp Junior

NA-16-3 Basic Combat demonstrator (NA-26)
One armed demonstrator and the first variant with retractable undercarriage, eventually sold to RCAF who modified it with Yale and Harvard parts.
powered by Pratt & Whitney R-1340 Wasp

NA-16-2H (NA-27)
One armed demonstrator sold to Royal Netherlands Air Force - not the same as the previous NA-16-2H.
powered by Pratt & Whitney R-1340 Wasp

NJ-1 (NA-28)
40 built to US Navy specifications, up engined BT-9B as advanced trainer with fixed gear.
powered by Pratt & Whitney R-1340 Wasp

BT-9C (NA-29)
66 built for USAAC - BT-9A with minor changes.
powered by Wright R-975 Whirlwind

Y1BT-10 (NA-29)
One built for USAAC - BT-9 with larger engine, similar to USN NJ-1 but armed and detail differences in engine installation.
powered by Pratt & Whitney R-1340 Wasp

BT-10 (NA-30)
Cancelled production version of Y1BT-10 for USAAC
powered by Pratt & Whitney R-1340 Wasp

NA-16-4M (NA-31)
138 built for Sweden's Flygvapnet as Sk 14/Sk 14A. Sk 14N trialled nosewheel for SAAB 21.
powered by Wright R-975 Whirlwind (Sk 14) or Piaggio P VII C (Sk 14A)

NA-16-1A (NA-32)
One built for Royal Australian Air Force but rejected in favour of NA-16-2K, fixed landing gear, similar to Y1BT-10.
powered by Pratt & Whitney R-1340 Wasp

NA-16-2K (NA-33)
756 for Royal Australian Air Force in Australia with local improvements as CAC Wirraway
powered by Pratt & Whitney R-1340 Wasp

NA-16-4P (NA-34)
29 built for Argentina (Army Aviation) - 1st major export order (previous orders involved licence production).
powered by Wright R-975 Whirlwind

NA-16-4R (NA-37)
One built for Imperial Japanese Navy as a technology demonstrator KXA-1 with fixed u/c and three-blade prop.
powered by Pratt & Whitney R-985 Wasp Junior

NA-16-4 (NA-41)
35 built for China (RoCAF) - Fixed gear, fabric covered fuselage
powered by Wright R-975 Whirlwind

NA-16-2A (NA-42)
Two built for Honduras (FAH)
powered by Pratt & Whitney R-1340 Wasp

NA-16-1G (NA-43)
Intended for Brazil (Army) but order cancelled. Was to have been similar to BT-9C
powered by Wright R-975 Whirlwind

NA-44
Armed company demonstrator sold to Canada. Designation reused for AT-6s sold to Brazil (NA-72) and Chile (NA-74).
powered by Wright R-1820 Cyclone.

NA-16-1GV (NA-45)
Three built for Venezuela (FAV) similar to USAAC NA-36 BC-1 but with round rudder and bomb racks under wing center section.
powered by Pratt & Whitney R-1340 Wasp

NA-16-4 (NA-46)
12 built for Brazilian Navy. Locally designated V1NA.
powered by Wright R-975 Whirlwind

NA-16-4RW (NA-47)
One built for Imperial Japanese Navy as a technology demonstrator KXA-2 similar to NA-16-4R but smaller engine.
powered by Wright R-975 Whirlwind

NA-16-3C (NA-48)
15 built for China (RoCAF) - Retractable undercarriage, fabric covered fuselage
powered by Pratt & Whitney R-1340 Wasp

NA-16-1E (NA-49/NA-61)
430 for Royal Air Force and Royal Canadian Air Force as the Harvard I with new canopy and square rudder. Also used by South Africa and Southern Rhodesia.
powered by Pratt & Whitney R-1340 Wasp

NA-16-4 (NA-56)
50 built for China (RoCAF) - Entirely new design with longer metal fuselage, triangular rudder and later T-6 style wing. Basically a BT-14 with the AT-6s R-1340 engine and canopy.
powered by Pratt & Whitney R-1340 Wasp

NA-57
230 improved NA-23s for France as NAA 57-P-2, most captured and used by Germany, some retained by Vichy France.
powered by Wright R-975 Whirlwind

NA-16-3 (NA-71)
Three built for Venezuela (FAV)
powered by Pratt & Whitney R-1340 Wasp

I.Ae. D.L. 21
An Argentinian version incorporating the NA-16-1 fuselage with locally designed wings. Rejected in favour of the I.Ae. 22 DL, an original design from the Fabrica Militar de Aviones (FMA).

== Operators ==
Argentina

- Army Aviation Service (Note: Some sources list the NA-16 as having been used by the Argentine Air Force however it was with its predecessor, the Army Aviation Service which was dissolved in 1945 when the Air Force was created.)

Australia

- Royal Australian Air Force (RAAF) (samples for licence production)

Brazil

- Brazilian Navy (Marinha do Brasil)

China

- Republic of China Air Force (RoCAF)

France

- French Air Force (Armée de l'Air)
- French Naval Aviation (Aéronavale)

Vichy France

- Vichy French Air Force

Nazi Germany

- Luftwaffe

Honduras

- Honduran Air Force (Fuerza Aérea Hondureña/FAH)

Empire of Japan

- Imperial Japanese Navy Air Service(IJNAS) (2 examples for evaluation only)

Netherlands

- Royal Netherlands Air Force (Koninklijke Luchtmacht/KLu)

South Africa

- South African Air Force (SAAF)

Southern Rhodesia

- Southern Rhodesian Air Force (SRAF)

Sweden

- Swedish Air Force (Flygvapnet)

United Kingdom

- Royal Air Force (RAF)

United States

- United States Army Air Corps (USAAC)/United States Army Air Forces (USAAF)
- United States Navy (USN)

Venezuela

- Venezuelan Air Force (Fuerza Aérea Venezolana/FAV)

== Surviving aircraft ==
- The only intact surviving example of an American built NA-16 is the NA-16-2A/NA-20 "FAH-21" displayed at the Honduran Aviation Museum at Toncontín.
- A Swedish NA-16-4M (locally designated as Sk 14) was built from an ex-RAAF CAC Wirraway (s/n A20-223) with additional parts from an ex-RCAF North American NA-64 Yale and is on display at the Swedish Air Force Museum.
- The CAC Wirraway (originally NA-16-2K) was first modified to British standards and equipment, then later models diverged further from the NA-16 in minor details such as the fitting of dive brakes etc. The sole surviving CA-1 Wirraway is A20-10, the 8th production Wirraway, effectively a licence built NA-16-2K, and held at the Australian National Aviation Museum. Ten Wirraways are on the Australian civil aircraft register. Further examples (in Australia unless noted) are at Temora Aviation Museum, Australian National Aviation Museum, Aviation Heritage Museum, Museum of Victoria, Queensland Air Museum, RAAF Museum (Stored) and the Fantasy of Flight (Florida - stored).

== Specifications (NA-16) ==
General characteristics

- Crew: two
- Length: 27 ft 7 in (8.41 m)
- Wingspan: 42 ft (13 m)
- Airfoil: root: NACA 2215; tip: NACA 2209
- Empty weight: 3,078 lb (1,396 kg)
- Powerplant: 1 × Wright R-975 Whirlwind air cooled radial, 400 hp (300 kW)
- Propellers: 2-bladed Hamilton Standard

Performance

- Maximum speed: 170 mph (270 km/h, 150 kn)
- Range: 700 mi (1,100 km, 610 nmi)

== See also ==
Related development

- North American BT-9
- North American BC-1
- North American A-27
- North American T-6 Texan
- North American P-64
- CAC Wirraway
- I.Ae. 21 DL

Aircraft of comparable role, configuration, and era

- CAC Wackett
- Curtiss-Wright CW-22/SNC
- Fleet Fort
- FMA I.Ae. 22 DL
- Kyushu K10W1
- Miles Martinet
- Miles Master
- VL Pyry
- Vultee BT-13 Valiant

Related lists

- List of military aircraft of the United States
- List of United States Navy aircraft designations (pre-1962)
- List of aircraft of the Royal Air Force
- List of aircraft of Canada's air forces
- List of aircraft of World War II
- North American T-6 Texan variants
