= Alfredo Bowman =

Honduran herbalist (1933–2016)

- Born: Alfredo Darrington Bowman; 26 November 1933; Ilanga, Honduras
- Died: 6 August 2016 (aged 82); Barrio Ingles La Ceiba, Honduras
- Cause of death: Pneumonia
- Occupations: Herbalist, witch doctor
- Spouses: Patsy Bowman; Maha Bowman
- Children: 22

Alfredo Darrington Bowman (26 November 1933 – 6 August 2016), also known as Dr. Sebi (/seɪbiː/), was a Honduran herbalist who practiced in the United States in the late 20th and early 21st centuries. Bowman professed to cure all disease with herbs and a plant-based alkaline diet based on various pseudoscientific claims, and denied that HIV caused AIDS. He set up a treatment center in Honduras, then moved his practice to New York City and Los Angeles. Numerous entertainment and acting celebrities were among his clients, including Michael Jackson, Lisa 'Left Eye' Lopes, and John Travolta.

Although he used the title and name Dr. Sebi, Bowman had not completed any formal medical training. He was considered a quack by licensed doctors, attorneys, and consumer protection agencies in the US. He was arrested and accused by New York state of practicing medicine without a license. After trial, Bowman was acquitted based on the legal definition of "medicine" for his herbs. He was later charged in a civil suit that resulted in him being prohibited from making therapeutic claims for his supplements.

In May 2016, Bowman was arrested in Honduras for money laundering, after being found carrying tens of thousands of dollars in cash with insufficient accounting for its origin. During several weeks' detention in jail, he contracted pneumonia. He died in police custody as he was being transported to a hospital.

== Early life ==
Bowman was born in 1933 in Ilanga, Honduras. His grandfather was originally from Haiti. Bowman was a Honduran of African descent, identified himself as an "African in Honduras", not as an Afro-Honduran. He first learned of herbal healing and related traditional practices from his grandmother.

Bowman became frustrated with Western medical practices in treating his own illnesses such as asthma, diabetes, impotency and visual impairment and visited an herbalist in Mexico named Alfredo Cortez who confirmed to him that he was dying.

== Career ==
Bowman began his own healing practice in Honduras soon after. He developed a treatment that he called the "African Bio-Electric Cell Food Therapy", and claimed that it could cure a wide range of diseases, including cancer and AIDS, as well as a variety of chronic conditions and mental illnesses. He also developed related herbal products. Bowman experimented with urine therapy which caused temporary blindness.

In the 1980s, Bowman established a treatment center near La Ceiba, Honduras, and marketed his herbal products in the US. He named his center the USHA Research Institute, as located in the village of Usha.

According to McGill University, Bowman's diet and food therapy was based on the discredited alkaline diet and showed a fundamental misunderstanding of genetics. His beliefs on the origin of disease denied germ theory and factored in faux-afrocentric claims about the unique genetic characteristics of Africans and their diaspora, which was referred to as "race pseudoscience" in a critical article published by McGill University.

In the early 1980s, AIDS had newly been recognized as a disease as an epidemic started in the United States, with numerous cases in New York and other major cities. Bowman claimed that HIV is not the cause of AIDS and used herbal remedies to treat people.

He gradually earned considerable revenue, more than $3,000 a day, after giving advice and developing a wide range of celebrity clients such as Lisa Lopes, Steven Seagal, John Travolta, Eddie Murphy and Michael Jackson. He relocated to Los Angeles, California, where he cultivated celebrities among his clients.

== Legal issues ==
=== Practicing without a medical license ===
In 1987, the New York State Attorney General charged Bowman with two counts of practicing medicine without a license after he placed ads in local newspapers claiming to be able to cure AIDS. The Attorney General's Office sent undercover agents to his office to gain diagnoses and treatments for purported symptoms of disease. Bowman was acquitted because jurors said the tape recorded by the agents failed to show that Bowman had made a medical diagnosis of their purported conditions.

In an effort to stop Bowman's false claims, the New York Assistant Attorney General for consumer fraud filed a civil suit against Bowman, his Ogun Herbal Research Institute, and other named businesses. It resulted in a consent agreement by which he was prohibited from making therapeutic claims for his products. He was also fined $900. The suit had ruled that the claims were unsubstantiated.

=== Michael Jackson ===
In 2004, Bowman reportedly treated Michael Jackson prior to his being tried on counts of child abuse. Bowman claimed to have helped the singer overcome addiction to painkillers Demerol and morphine with his African Bio-Electric Cell Food Therapy. He worked with Jackson for six months at a retreat in Aspen, Colorado.

After Jackson's brother Randy paid Bowman $10,000, Bowman sued Michael Jackson for related costs, claiming that the singer owed him $380,000, and seeking an additional $600,000 in lost revenue for having deferred other clients and various speaking engagements. Raymone Bain, a publicist of Jackson, denied that her client received any "professional treatment" or that he had any painkiller addiction. The case was dismissed in 2015 for lack of prosecution.

=== Arrest for money laundering ===
On 28 May 2016, Bowman and his associate Pablo Medina Gamboa were arrested on charges of money laundering at the Juan Manuel Gálvez de Roatan Airport, after they were found to be carrying $37,000 in cash and had no explanation for it. They were attempting to transfer from a commercial flight from the United States to a private plane for another destination in Honduras.

Bowman was released pending a court hearing on 6 June 2016, but he was re-arrested by the Public Ministerio on money laundering charges. He was held for several weeks in a Honduran prison, while his family was attempting to obtain his release.

== Personal life and demise ==
Bowman was known to have been married twice. At the time of his death, he had 22 living children.

While in police custody in Honduras for money laundering, Bowman became ill. After police officials realized the severity of his condition, they transported him to a hospital. Bowman died of complications of pneumonia on 6 August 2016, en route to Hospital D'Antoni. The length of his time in custody and the poor condition of the jail may have contributed to his death.

Some of Bowman's followers have questioned the circumstances of his arrest and death. They claim that there was a conspiracy to silence him because his teachings differed from the medical establishment and threatened the pharmaceutical industry. His family members do not subscribe to conspiracy theories about his death. They link his age and the poor conditions in the prison for causing his pneumonia. Another Bowman family member nearly died in the same prison because of the conditions.

== Legacy ==
In 2018, African-American rapper Nipsey Hussle stated he was planning on creating a documentary about Bowman. Hussle was later murdered in 2019 by an acquaintance. Law enforcement have found no link between Hussle's death and Bowman.

Rapper Kendrick Lamar mentions Dr. Sebi in the lyrics to the song "Worldwide Steppers" from his 2022 album Mr. Morale & the Big Steppers.

== See also ==
- Herbal medicine
