= Vaccaro brothers =

Italian-American businessmen

Vaccaro Bros. and Co.
- Industry: Fruit importing and shipping
- Founded: 1860s
- Founders: Stefano Vaccaro; Joseph Vaccaro; Luca Vaccaro; Felix Vaccaro
- Fate: Renamed as Standard Fruit Company
- Successor: Standard Fruit Company
- Key people: Joseph Vaccaro; Luca Vaccaro; Felix Vaccaro
- Products: Fruit, ice

Joseph, Luca, and Felix Vaccaro, known as the Vaccaro brothers, were Italian-American businessmen originally from Sicily.

The brothers were the sons of Stefano Vaccaro, a fruit importer based in New Orleans, Louisiana. Stefano began importing fruit in the 1860s and retired in 1893. His sons took his business over after his retirement. The business was incorporated as Vaccaro Bros. and Co. in 1906. The Vaccaro Bros. company dealt with fruit importing and later providing ice for refrigeration steamships.

The Vaccaro Bros. fruit company became a large player in the Central American fruit trade, especially in the nation of Honduras. It was renamed to Standard Fruit Company in 1924 and again to Standard Fruit and Steamship Company in 1926.

The Vaccaro Bros. company is considered to be the earliest incarnation of Dole Food Company, as Standard Fruit was acquired by Castle & Cooke in 1964, which split to become Dole Food Company in 1995.

== Vaccaro family ==
The Vaccaro Bros. fruit company was primarily run by Joseph, Luca, and Felix Vaccaro, the three oldest of the six children of Stefano Vaccaro (1831-1911) and Maria Vaccaro (née Pumilia, 1834-1890).

Stefano Vaccaro was born on May 11, 1831, in Contessa Entellina, Italy. He was the second child of Giuseppe Vaccaro and Francesca Pizzolato. The Vaccaro family had existed in Contessa Entellina since the arrival of Stephano Vaccaro from Sambuca di Sicilia around 1780. Stefano married Maria Pumilia in September 1853. During the late 1850s, Stefano was a revolutionary involved with Giuseppe Garibaldi, and served in the Second Italian War of Independence. In either 1858 or 1859 he was captured and served as a prisoner of war in Austria. Upon his release in 1860, he immigrated to the United States, settling in New Orleans. His wife Maria died in 1890 and in 1893, he retired to Contessa Entellina, where he died on September 28, 1911, at the age of 80.

Giuseppe "Joseph" Vaccaro (1855-1945) was born on November 2, 1855, in Contessa Entellina, Italy. He was the oldest of the children born to Stefano and Maria Vaccaro. He immigrated with the family to New Orleans in 1860, where he took the name Joseph. He married Antonina Mustacchia in September 1876, and the pair had nine children, though one died in infancy. Joseph died in New Orleans on April 30, 1945, at the age of 89.

Luca Vaccaro (1858-1936) was born on June 5, 1858, in Contessa Entellina, Italy. He was the second oldest of the children born to Stefano and Maria Vaccaro. He immigrated with the family to New Orleans in 1860. He was married twice, first to Margharita Mustacchia, the sister of his brother Joseph's wife Antonina Mustacchia, whom he married in New Orleans in 1878. The couple had two children and divorced around 1890. His second marriage was to an American woman named Marie Louise Tranchand whom he married in 1894 in Manhattan. The couple had seven children together and stayed married until Luca's death in New Orleans on November 29, 1936, at the age of 78.

Felix Philip Vaccaro (1866-1943) was born on February 20, 1866, in Contessa Entellina, Italy. He was the third child born to Stefano and Maria Vaccaro. He grew up in New Orleans. He was married twice, first to Anna Smith, an American woman, whom he married around 1890, however Anna died in 1918. He remarried in 1927 to Louise Marie Legendre, a New Orleans native. He had no children with either spouse and died in New Orleans on October 18, 1943, at the age of 77.

Stefano and Maria also had three more children: Michiele (1869-???), Francesca (1873-1903), and Michele (1856-1958).

== Vaccaro Bros. Company ==
To escape the Second Italian War of Independence, Stefano Vaccaro immigrated to the United States in 1860 and settled in New Orleans. He relocated in 1861 to Louisville, Kentucky, upon the outbreak of the American Civil War. He returned to New Orleans in 1863 and started a business importing coconuts from Honduras. Stefano retired in 1893 and his sons Joseph, Luca, and Felix took over. The brothers expanded the business into oranges, buying numerous orange groves in Honduras. Their produce at this time was shipped on nine mainly Norwegian chartered ships.

In 1899, Joseph's daughter Maria married a Sicilian immigrant named Salvador D'Antoni (1874-1957). The same year, the Vaccaro brothers brought D'Antoni into the company and bought a beachfront property in La Ceiba, Honduras, to build a harbor as they intended to buy a fleet of ships.

In the winter of 1899, severe blizzards destroyed many of the company's Louisianan orange groves, and the company decided to invest in bananas instead. This venture proved greatly profitable for the Vaccaro Bros. With the rising profits they bought their first two ships, the Santo Oteri and the Premier, in 1900.

As the company grew, the Vaccaro Bros. company began buying more land in Honduras. In 1907, Miguel R. Dávila was elected president of Honduras, and sought to ease the growth of Honduras' debt by outsourcing government projects to the Vaccaro Bros. company in exchange for land grants. The Vaccaro Bros. worked with Dávila's government to fund roadways, railways, and shipping wharves. The land grants to the Vaccaro Bros. company upset Samuel Zemurray, owner of the Cuyamel Fruit Company who were also operating in Honduras. As a result, in 1911, Zemurray ordered mercenaries Lee Christmas and Guy Molony to oust Dávila. Dávila was successfully replaced in March 1911 by Francisco Bertrand, who resigned in February 1912 and was replaced with Manuel Bonilla, who favored Cuyamel over the Vaccaro Bros.

The Vaccaro Bros. made up for the loss of profits from Honduras by expanding their business into providing ice for steamships with refrigerators. This allowed the company to expand into greater territory and became the main source of income for the company. The company used some of their newfound profits to provide funding for Honduras' first bank, Banco Atlántida in La Ceiba, which was opened in 1913. By 1915, the company had become so large that Joseph Vaccaro owned a majority of the ice refrigerators in New Orleans for use in their shipping operations, leading to him being given the nickname "the Ice King".

By 1924, The Vaccaro Bros. and Co. was both the largest importer from Honduras and the largest foreign investor in Honduras. It was also the second largest fruit company in the world behind Cuyamel Fruit, which had become United Fruit Company. The company renamed to Standard Fruit Company that year and became public company in 1925, now under the general management of Vicente D'Antoni. In 1925, Standard Fruit operated a fleet of between nine and nineteen ships. In 1926, the company renamed again to Standard Fruit & Steamship Company. The Vaccaro Bros. company was also continuing its philanthropy around this time when it provided a substantial amount of funding to Honduras' first hospital, Hospital Vicente D'Antoni in La Ceiba which was opened in 1924.

=== Connection to Dole Foods Company ===
Standard Fruit continued operations until 1964 when it was purchased by Castle & Cooke, an agricultural and real estate company founded in 1851 by S. N. Castle and A. S. Cooke which had become one of the five largest companies operating in the Territory of Hawaii. James Dole's Hawaiian Pineapple Company was a supplier of Castle & Cooke since 1906, and Castle & Cooke had been selling Dole branded bananas since 1927. David H. Murdock bought the company in 1985 and in 1991 renamed Castle & Cooke to the Dole Food Company. Murdock split the two companies into two separate companies, Dole plc and Castle & Cooke, Inc., in 1995.

The majority of the land and operations that became Dole Food Company was directly from Standard Fruit, leading to the Vaccaro brothers' enterprise being considered the first incarnation of the Dole Food Company.

== See also ==
- Italians in New Orleans
- Banana republic
