= Social conditions in Honduras =

Honduras has experienced a long history of changing social conditions, beginning with the bands of foragers in ancient times, through the development of complex societies in the Pacific coast side of the isthmus, and evolving through the innovations introduced by the Spanish in the colonial period.

Post colonial Honduras continued many of the colonial social structures and institutions, with major additions in the late nineteenth and early twentieth century as major foreign companies pioneered new modes of producing export products and systems of controlling labor. More recent trends in industrialization have also had important effects.

== Summary ==
Honduras faces enormous challenges in the areas of crime and human rights and improving overall economic and living conditions in one of the hemisphere's poorest countries. The United States has a close relationship with Honduras, characterized by significant foreign assistance, an important trade partnership, a military presence in the country, and cooperation on a range of transnational issues.

A U.S.-Central America Free Trade Agreement (CAFTA) with five Central American countries was signed on May 28, 2004, and a combined U.S.-Dominican Republic-Central America Free Trade Agreement (DR-CAFTA) was signed on August 5, 2004. The Honduran Congress approved the agreement on March 3, 2005, by a vote of 124–4. The Bush administration views DR-CAFTA as a means of solidifying democracy in Honduras and promoting safeguards for environmental protection and labor rights in the country.

Critics fear that a CAFTA without strong environmental and labor provisions would do nothing to spur reforms in the country. For additional information, see CRS Report RL31870, The Dominican Republic.-Central America-United States Free Trade Agreement (DRCAFTA); and CRS Report RL32322, Central America and the Dominican Republic in the Context of the Free Trade Agreement (DR-CAFTA) with the United States.

== Social history ==
=== Early history ===
The indigenous people of Honduras developed stratified societies in some regions very early, and much of the earliest period conditions were shaped by its division into unequally represented social groups, in which some economic exploitation took place. Documentation, limited as it was from Maya sites confirms this inequality which is also observed archaeologically.

Early Spanish reports likewise speak of inequities in the society, and the Spanish tended to exacerbate these. The encomienda system while it initially drew heavily on the older systems of taxation and labor employment used by indigenous polities, added new elements. The mining economy, at first drawing on laborers from the encomiendas, increasing used slave labor in the late sixteenth century, and then as the mines were depleted, also turned back to wage labor.

=== Twentieth century ===
In the last years of the nineteenth century, Honduran governments sought to encourage economic growth by creating incentives for foreign concerns to operate in the country. The involvement of such companies as United Fruit, Standard Fruit and others in the northern sections of the country led to concentration of landholdings, the emergence of a class of North American managers living in separate quarters on estates, and the importation of migrant workers from the English-Speaking Caribbean and elsewhere in Central America altered the pattern of small holding farming that had prevailed in the region before. Many of the new workers were housed in barracks, frequently came without families and were subject to strict discipline.

Beginning in the late 1970s, new foreign concerns began the introduction of maquiladoras, larger more modern factories to produce textiles and other goods. They were particularly interested in using the labor of young females, to the point that in much of the industry female workers outnumber male by as much as two-to-one. This imbalance in employment has led increasingly to problems with the often unemployed males, and led to a concomitant growth of gangs and violence. Substance abuse, at first primarily alcohol, and later hard drugs (especially as the international drug trade has made use of Honduras for the transit of drugs) have created their own problems.
