= Cuyamel Fruit Company =

American fruit company (1911-1929)

- House flag
- Formerly: Hubbard-Zemurray Steam Ship Company
- Industry: Agriculture
- Founder: William Streich
- Fate: Purchased by United Fruit Company in 1929

Cuyamel Fruit Company, formerly the Hubbard-Zemurray Steam Ship Company, was an American agricultural corporation operating in Honduras from 1911 until 1929, before being purchased by the United Fruit Company. The company was founded in the 1890s by William Streich to export bananas and sugar from the northwestern Cortés region of Honduras to international markets. It was bought by Samuel Zemurray around 1905, who took the company name for his own operation. Zemurray would later become the president of the United Fruit Company. Both Cuyamel and United Fruit are corporate ancestors of the modern-day firm Chiquita Brands International.

== Early years ==
Cuyamel Fruit Company was founded in the 1890s by William Streich, a speculator who bought land near the Cuyamel River in Honduras. The company soon ran out of money and was purchased around 1905 by the Russian born Samuel Zemurray, who used it as part of the beginning of his growing banana trade operation.

Zemurray started selling bananas in Mobile, Alabama as a teenager before moving to New Orleans, Louisiana. He discovered that United Fruit, the major importer, was discarding bananas that were ripened earlier than others within the rest of a shipment. He found that they could be sold to the public at a discount and made arrangements to act as an intermediary. He set up a network of agents in the Southern region to sell at major rail stops. With the growth of his network, he relocated from Mobile to New Orleans to be closer to the docks. After earning enough profit selling bananas working from New Orleans, Zemurray helped start a steamship line to import bananas from independent growers in the tropics to sell in the United States. This firm was known as the Hubbard-Zemurray Steam Ship Company. Zemurray was able to expand his company by reducing banana spoilage in transit. Though information on this early incarnation of the company is scarce, records show that the Hubbard-Zemurray group was involved in at least one case before the Supreme Court of the United States.

== Growth in Honduras ==
After his achievements in New Orleans, Zemurray headed to Honduras to expand his company into banana production. Honduras, a Central American country close to the Equator, is well-suited for growing bananas. With its new operations in Honduras, Hubbard-Zemurray would eventually become Cuyamel.

== Competition ==
Zemurray and his firm were not without competition. The main player angling for control of the Honduras banana market besides Cuyamel Fruit was a firm called “Vaccaro Brothers and Company.” The organization was started by three American brothers of Sicilian heritage- Joseph, Felix, and Lucca Vaccaro- and their brother-in-law, Salvador D'Antoni. Vaccaro would become the Standard Fruit Company, which in turn would later be purchased by the company now known as Dole Foods.

Both the Vaccaro firm and Cuyamel were relatively minor players in the banana export market, both dwarfed by the United Fruit Company of Boston. Before United Fruit entered Honduras as a direct producer in 1910, the firm participated in the Honduras market by proxy through investments in both Zemurray's and Vaccaro Brothers' companies. Before United developed plantations of its own in the cities of Trujillo and Tela, it owned 60% of Cuyamel and 50% of Vaccaro. Even though the three companies were competitive, they maintained a cartel-like cooperation, with joint efforts in advertising and increasing banana agricultural outputs in Honduras.

== The Honduras "Banana Republic" ==
Regardless of this cooperation, it was the nature of the three companies' competition that led to political discord in Central American states in the early 20th century. Zemurray had played an active role in Honduran politics since he first arrived in the country. In 1910, the administration of President Miguel R. Dávila granted the Vaccaro Brothers' Company land for railroad construction and prohibited competitors from building a competing railroad within 20 kilometers of the Vaccaro line. Zemurray was no fan of the Dávila administration, having provided encouragement and financial aid in a failed 1908 coup attempt against Dávila.

Dávila's concessions to Vaccaro pushed Zemurray over the edge. He found his opportunity in former President Manuel Bonilla. Zemurray supplied weapons and transportation for Bonilla to launch a coup against Dávila. President Dávila fled, and Bonilla once again assumed the presidency of the nation, owing in large part to the direct intervention of Zemurray.

Shortly before Bonilla ascended to the presidency, Zemurray in 1911 transformed his company from Hubbard-Zemurray into Cuyamel Fruit Company. He acquired 5,000 acres of land for agriculture along the Cuyamel River in the northwestern extremity of Honduras, near the Guatemalan border. The firm took its new name either from this river or from the town of Cuyamel nearby. As a repayment for his support, Bonilla also granted Zemurray a concession to build a railroad between the town of Cuyamel, by the coast, and Veracruz, in the interior [6]. The company's main Honduras office was in the coastal city of Puerto Cortés.

The 1908 failed coup and the Bonilla coup would mark a tradition in Honduras and other Central American states of banana companies intervening in government affairs. This practice would last up until the 1970s. The most famous of these interventions is probably the CIA-backed Guatemalan Coup of 1954. However, unlike other countries surrounding it, Honduras was unable to urbanize or diversify its economy beyond the banana industry. The country became the paragon "banana republic" with an economy dominated by oligarchic banana plantations serving as a playground for foreign-owned companies.

== The uneasy peace and the 1920s ==
Historians classify the period between 1911 and 1920 as a time of "relative stability" for Cuyamel and Honduras. There were no more coups in the country through the end of the decade, but Zemurray's Cuyamel Fruit was in fierce competition with Vaccaro and United. What's more, Cuyamel's development of a previously empty strip of land along the Guatemala-Honduras border almost led to an outbreak of war between the two states, but this was halted by United States mediation. This incident of near-war strained relations between pro-Honduras Cuyamel and pro-Guatemala United, and this tension would not fully cool off until the two companies became one in 1929. Despite its challenges, Cuyamel was able to expand into a near-sovereign entity. The American Embassy in Honduras went as far as saying, in 1916, that "the territory controlled by the Cuyamel Fruit Company is a state itself, within another state…it houses its employees, cultivates plantations, operates railroads, stations, steamship lines, potable water systems, power plants, commissaries, [and] clubs." By the 1920s, the land and the railroad grant that Zemurray started with in Honduras had helped him to emerge as even more of an industrial titan than he already was, and thanks to both a friendly relationship with the government of Honduras and strong sales, the company was able to expand its holdings.

Records indicate that the company was incorporated in Delaware, but its board of directors met in New Orleans, Zemurray's adopted city. The firm organized operations under several subsidiaries. The Cuyamel subsidiary known as the "Cortés Company" was the firm's manager of Honduran operations. Other Central American subsidiaries under Cuyamel's control included the "Bluefields Company" in Nicaragua, the "Transport Company" to run the corporate freight rail and steam lines, and the "Sula Sugar Company" to manage the company's sugarcane interests.

Figures from 1924 peg the combined assets of these affiliates at $3.97 billion in modern inflation-adjusted figures. The stock of Cuyamel fell by 20 points that same year. In 1925, the firm issued $5 million in bonds backed by such prestigious firms as Lehman Brothers and Goldman Sachs to finance the company's purchase of land along the Ulúa River in western Honduras. Sales data from 1927 shows that Cuyamel accounted for about 14% of the bananas imported and sold in the United States that year.

== Sale to United Fruit ==
In 1929, after the October crash of international financial markets, Zemurray sold Cuyamel to United Fruit in exchange for stock and retired. Black Tuesday sent Cuyamel shares into a tailspin, forcing the combination of the two companies (Vaccaro, known by 1929 as the Standard Fruit Company, remained independent). For his sale of the Cuyamel Fruit Company, Zemurray received 300,000 shares of United Fruit, with a market valuation of $31 million, which would be about $420 million today. With the sale, United Fruit secured its domination of the United States banana market for the better part of the 20th century.

Zemurray received a seat on the board of directors of United Fruit after he sold his company, but mismanagement in the face of hard economic times sent the business' valuation falling. Zemurray bought up discounted equity in the company until he could take it over as a majority shareholder. With control of the firm, Zemurray came out of retirement and named himself CEO of his once formidable competitor in 1933. He reorganized operations and restored United Fruit's profits and value. Zemurray was CEO until his retirement in 1954.

At the end of his tenure, United Fruit was able to motivate the U.S. federal government to back a coup against Guatemalan President Jacobo Arbenz. This coup led to years of civil war and unrest and is perhaps the most famous incident in United Fruit's history.

== Legacy ==
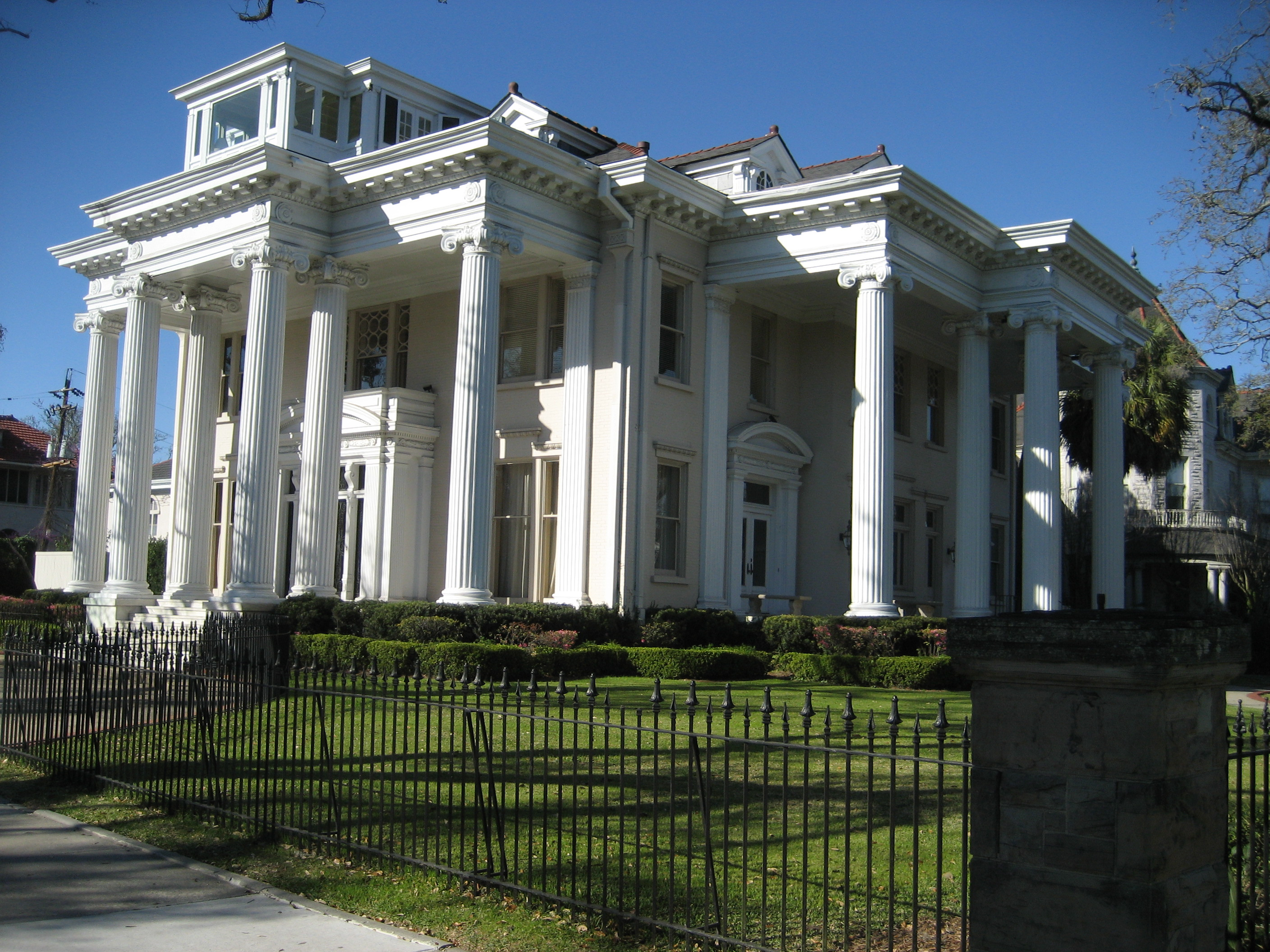
Zemurray's home is today where the president of Tulane University lives.

Zemurray used the proceeds and the influence afforded to him by his ownership of Cuyamel and later United to support a number of philanthropic causes. He was a supporter of progressive political movements in the United States such as Franklin Roosevelt's New Deal. He also supported the left-leaning magazine The Nation. A Jewish businessman from Eastern Europe, he contributed to Jewish nationalist groups. His home is today the residence of the president of Tulane University in New Orleans.

== See also ==
- Samuel Zemurray
- United Fruit Company
- Banana republic
