= Junta (game) =

Board game

- Players: 2–7 (4–7 for full game)
- Setup time: 10–15 minutes
- Playing time: 3–7 hours
- Chance: Medium
- Skills: Dice rolling, Counting, Social skills

Junta is a board game designed by Vincent Tsao, first published in 1978 by Creative Wargames Workshop and published, as of 1985, by West End Games. Players compete as the corrupt power elite families of a fictional parody of a stereotypical banana republic (specifically Republica de los Bananas) trying to get as much money as possible into their Swiss bank accounts before the foreign aid money runs out. Fighting in the republic's capital during recurrent coup attempts encompasses most of the game's equipment, rules and playtime. This game-within-the-game is however actually tangential to the players' main goal.

The length of the game depends on how often coups are declared, but can often exceed six hours.

The game's title is taken from the Spanish term "Junta" that originally referred to the executive bodies that frequently came to power after a military coup in 20th century Latin America (the Spanish version is called Golpe, which means coup d'état). In the game, the term refers to the players who declare "Rebel" at the beginning of the coup phase, and—if the coup is victorious—to the players who declare "pro-Junta" at the end of the coup phase to elect a new president.

== Players ==
The players of Junta represent corrupt and powerful Banana republic families. Although players are often executed or assassinated in the course of gameplay, the only real implication of a player's death is the loss of cash and Junta cards the player is carrying and a temporary inability to participate until the next turn, when another member of the family steps up to assume the responsibilities of the deceased. Each player is given a family token to underscore this permanent identity, although the token has no effect on game play. Cabinet positions, however, which are denoted by cards, are reassigned each turn.

== Game play ==
Each game turn represents a year, which takes place during seven stages represented on the board's "political track". The game ends when the President cannot draw eight bills from the foreign aid money at the beginning of a turn. This event is disguised by the blank bills placed at the bottom of the foreign aid deck and by the "used" bills which are placed under the blanks when spent as part of a card action. A typical game will have 9–11 rounds. The winner is the player who has the most money in their Swiss bank account at the end of the game. Money on one's person is irrelevant.

Each player not in exile has the ability to draw and play "Junta" cards, direct the votes he controls via cabinet positions, influence, and vote cards on the President and the budget votes, carry out the abilities listed on his influence cards and cabinet positions, command his troops during a coup, and manage his money. In all votes, each player commands one vote representing himself and whatever votes he can garner from influence or voting cards. The only exception is the Presidential election after a successful coup in which each rebel player commands one and only one vote.

=== Upkeep phase ===
Junta cards are drawn and El Presidente is elected, if necessary. Each player's vote in the Chamber of Deputies as well as influence and vote cards are used. An errata later clarified that if a player declines a nomination votes may be recast with the exception of vote cards which are discarded. El Presidente retains this position until the event of assassination, a successful coup, or resignation. All three events have the effect of liquidating the President's assets and delivering the cash to the assassin or successor.

=== Cabinet phase ===
El Presidente assigns cabinet positions to the other players. El Presidente cannot hold a cabinet position and must assign each other player at least one position. If fewer than seven players are playing, or if players are in exile, players may hold two positions, but no more than one Generalship. Each cabinet position (note: not each player) holds one vote in the Chamber of Deputies. Cabinet positions are as follows:

Minister of Internal Security
The commander of the secret police, who may deliver a "free" assassination each turn. The Minister also may force a budget to pass if it fails and has the option of assassinating any player returning from "exile."
Generals of the 1st, 2nd, and 3rd armies
Generals control their respective armies in the event of a coup.
Chief of the Air Force
Controls airstrikes and paratroopers in the event of a coup.
Admiral of the Navy
Controls naval bombardment and marines in the event of a coup. The rulebook makes reference to the "ceremonial shelling of the Presidential Palace" at the beginning of a coup.

=== Budget phase ===
El Presidente draws 8 bills from the foreign aid money deck. Bills come in denominations of 1, 2, or 3 million pesos in order of decreasing probability. Thus, the President may draw between 8 and 24 million pesos on a given turn. El Presidente then assigns the budget by declaring how much money each player is intended to receive. Only the President knows the amount drawn, but must reveal how much each other player is intended to be given. The budget is then voted on. If the budget fails the President keeps all the money, unless the Minister forces the budget to pass. Forcing the budget to pass has the effect of distributing the foreign aid money as if the budget had passed, consolidating the police units in the Chamber of Deputies, and making a coup justified that turn.

=== Assassination phase ===
A round of assassinations takes place. First each player chooses his location using the location tiles in a secret yet binding fashion. Locations are as follows:

- Home (causes the player to be killed if a "burglars" assassination card is played against him)
- Mistress (leaves a player vulnerable to a "character assassination" card)
- Nightclub
- Headquarters (allows the player to start a coup without an excuse)
- Bank (allows the player to access his Swiss bank account, should he survive to the banking phase)

Then each player declares their assassinations. The Minister of Internal Security gets to use the secret police for one assassination and any player may order one with an assassination card. To declare an assassination, a player must name the player who is the target and the location at which the assassination will be attempted. Once all assassinations are declared, they are resolved in order. An assassination is successful if a player's location is guessed correctly, although some assassination cards require a successful dice roll as well and some cards may be used to thwart an assassination.

If multiple assassination attempts are declared against a single player, they are resolved in the order they were declared (a player cannot be killed more than once). An assassinated player discards their hand, turns over their cash to the assassin, and is inactive for the rest of the turn. Assassinations are transitive: if A assassinates B and B assassinates C, A gets both B and C's money. If players kill each other — A assassinates B and B assassinates A – then both players' money is discarded to the bottom of the foreign aid deck (under the blanks). The same holds true for larger mutual assassinations (A assassinates B, B assassinates C, C assassinates A). If all players die during the assassination phase, then the game ends with no winner.

Assassination attempts by the Minister's secret police may not take place at the Bank two turns in a row. After an assassination attempt has taken place at the Bank, an indicator on the board is changed to indicate that the "Bank is Safe" from the secret police for a turn. The "Bank is Safe" indicator does not affect assassin cards.

If the President has been assassinated, a new President is elected immediately after the last assassination has been resolved. Assassinated players may not take any action until the beginning of the next turn.

=== Banking phase ===
A player who chose the Bank as his location and who escaped assassination may deposit or withdraw money from their Swiss bank account unless the budget failed. If the budget failed but was forced through by the Minister of Internal Security, the bank is closed for lunch until after the coup phase. If the budget failed altogether, leaving the President with the entire foreign aid, no banking may take place at all this turn.

=== Coup phase ===
The majority of the Junta board is used only during a coup.

Coups are a tactical game within the game that may result in the replacement of the President and unfortunate players being sent to the firing squad. Which side a player supports is often unclear during a coup. A scheming player can benefit by concealing their true objectives to gain a favourable position to negotiate from. Others may find it easier simply being a turncoat.

==== Starting a coup ====
To start a coup there must exist a coup excuse, which is kept track of by an indicator on the board. Coup excuses are as follows:

- The budget failed.
- The Minister of Internal Security seized the Chamber of Deputies.
- Any player was assassinated.
- Any player plays a card providing a coup excuse.

Also, any player who chose "Headquarters" as their location in the Location phase may start a coup without an excuse to do so.

If allowed, any player may start a coup, thus becoming First Rebel, by playing a card to place units on the board, moving any unit or bombarding the presidential palace. If no player does this, no coup takes place. The risk a player takes in becoming the First Rebel is that the player might become the only rebel, and suffer reprisals in the wake of an unsuccessful coup.

==== Rebel phase ====
The first phase of a coup is called the rebel phase. After the First Rebel has initiated the coup, all players in turn are given a chance to act. Any player who chooses to move or fire during the rebel phase becomes a rebel. Players who refrain from acting in the rebel phase remain loyalists.

==== Coup phases ====
Following the rebel phase comes six coup phases. The players battle for control of five buildings, shown in red on the map, vital for the post-coup resolution. They are:

- The Presidential Palace
- The Radio Station (WZAP)
- The Chamber of Deputies
- The Treasury
- The Railway Station

Although there officially are the two sides of rebels and loyalists, in-faction fighting may take place as players change sides or seize opportunities of gaining a stronger position. Should a loyalist attack a Palace Guard unit, that player turns into a rebel. A rebel, however, cannot become a loyalist.

The combat rules are fairly complex. Units first move, and then volleys can be fired between opposing units that are in the same area. The side that loses the most units from combat must retreat to an unoccupied adjacent area.

==== Coup victory ====
After the end of the final coup phase, the players negotiate and must declare themselves either Pro-President or Pro-Junta. A rebel may choose to be Pro-President, and a loyalist may see reasons to become Pro-Junta. The side controlling three or more of the vital buildings is victorious.

If the President prevails, any one rebel may be sent to the firing squad. In the case of a Junta victory, the rebels elect a new President. A Pro-Junta loyalist takes no part in the election. The First Rebel breaks a tied vote. The new President may then send any player, regardless of whether they were rebel or loyalist, to be executed. An executed player discards their political cards and hands over their pocket money to the President.

=== Exile ===
A player may go into exile during the Location phase by placing a location marker on one of the embassies on the map, to indicate the country to which the player fled. It is also possible to flee the republic during a coup, provided that the player controls an embassy with their forces.

A player in exile is safe from executions and assassinations, but is very limited in all but the social aspects of the game. A player may return from exile at any time, but normally the Minister of Internal Security may have the returning player executed by the secret police at will. It is only safe to return from exile when the President is dead, before a new one has been elected, during a coup provided that a friendly player controls the relevant embassy, or if the Minister's position is frozen (see below).

=== Brother-in-law ===
A dead or exiled player may not use any of their family's cabinet positions. The President may control one such position through their brother-in-law. Any other positions of dead or exiled players are considered frozen.

== Reception ==
Aaron Allston reviewed Junta in The Space Gamer No. 33. Allston commented that "Overall, Junta is highly recommended to all gamers who enjoy backstabbing."

In the December 1993 edition of Dragon (Issue 200), Allen Varney gave Junta a thumbs up: "Do you like casual corruption, hilarious doubletalk, and soldiers who can’t shoot straight? We got them all. Muy bien, I think!"

In Issue 25 of Phoenix (May–June 1980), Roger Musson found the map and counters "quite attractive", but thought the cards were too thin and likely to wear. Nonetheless, he found Junta "a very enjoyable game, well worth playing, and likely to appeal to a very wide range of players."

Junta was chosen for inclusion in the 2007 book Hobby Games: The 100 Best. Darren Watts commented, "Junta isn't one of the 100 greatest hobby games because of its rules and mechanics — they're good, each of them, but not brilliant. It's a great hobby game because it creates a mood and captures a theme brilliantly, and integrates every single design element to that cause. With its wonderful sense of comical menace, political instability, and institutionalized corruption, Junta is a hoot and a half to play."

== Other reviews ==
- Casus Belli No. 32 (Apr 1986)
- Games #17
- 1980 Games 100 in Games
- 1981 Games 100 in Games
- 1982 Games 100 in Games
- Jeux & Stratégie #43
- Game News #6 (Aug., 1985)
