= Banana republic =

Term for a politically unstable country

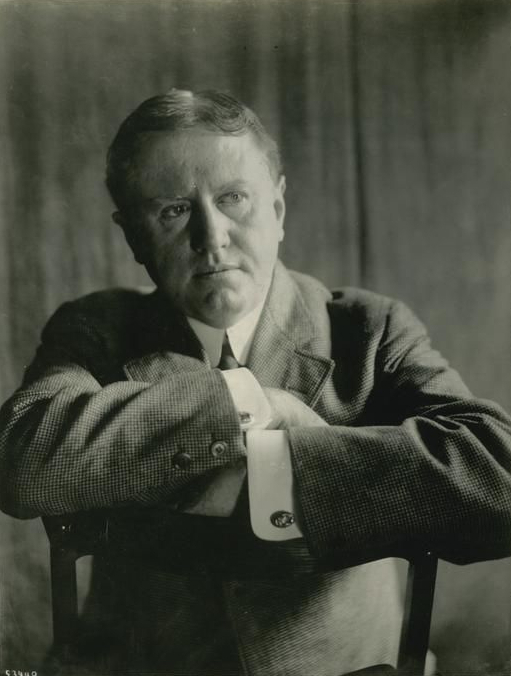
The phrase banana republic was coined in 1904 by American writer O. Henry.

In political science, the term banana republic describes a politically and economically unstable country with an economy dependent upon the export of natural resources.

A banana republic is a country with an economy of state capitalism, where the country is operated as a private commercial enterprise for the exclusive profit of the ruling class. Typically, a banana republic has a society of extremely stratified social classes, usually a large impoverished working class and a ruling class plutocracy, composed of business, political, and military elites. The ruling class controls the primary sector of the economy by exploiting labor. Such exploitation is enabled by collusion between the state and favored economic monopolies, in which the profit, derived from the private exploitation of public lands, is private property. At the same time, the debts incurred are the responsibility of the public treasury. Therefore, the term banana republic is a pejorative descriptor for a servile oligarchy that abets and supports, for kickbacks, the exploitation of large-scale plantation agriculture, especially banana cultivation.

Such an imbalanced economy remains limited by the uneven economic development of towns and countries and usually reduces the value of the national currency, rendering the country ineligible for international development credit.

== Etymology ==
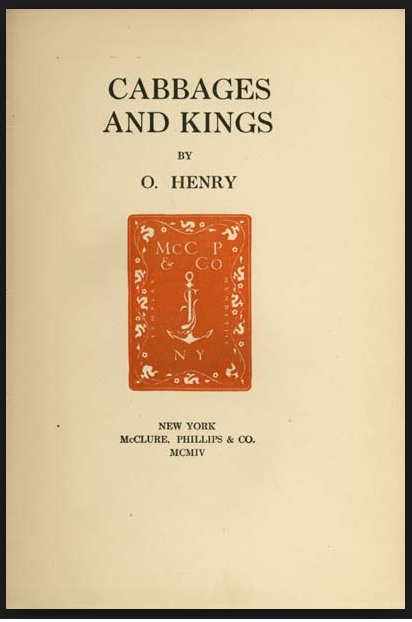
Cover of Cabbages and Kings (1904 edition)

In the 20th century, American writer O. Henry (William Sydney Porter, 1862–1910) coined the term banana republic to describe the fictional Republic of Anchuria in the book Cabbages and Kings (1904), a collection of thematically related short stories inspired by his experiences in Honduras, whose economy was heavily dependent on the export of bananas. He lived there for six months until January 1897, hiding in a hotel while he was wanted in the United States for embezzlement from a bank.

In the early 20th century, the United Fruit Company, a multinational corporation, was instrumental in the creation of the banana republic phenomenon. Together with other American corporations, such as the Cuyamel Fruit Company, and leveraging the power of the U.S. government, the corporations created the political, economic, and social circumstances that led to a coup of the locally elected democratic government that established banana republics in Central American countries such as Honduras and Guatemala. No official apology has ever been done by any banana company or the U.S. with only the C.I.A.-backed dictator of Guatemala apologizing in 2011.

== Origin ==
The history of the banana republic began with the introduction of the banana fruit to the United States in 1870, by Lorenzo Dow Baker, captain of the schooner Telegraph, who bought bananas in Jamaica and sold them in Boston at a 1,000% profit. The banana proved popular with Americans, as a nutritious tropical fruit that was less expensive than locally grown fruit in the U.S., such as apples; in 1913, 25 cents (equivalent to $8.14 in 2025) bought a dozen bananas, but only two apples. In 1873, to produce food for their railroad workers, American railroad tycoons Henry Meiggs and his nephew, Minor C. Keith, established banana plantations along the railroads they built in Costa Rica; recognising the profitability of exporting bananas, they began exporting the fruit to the Southeastern United States.

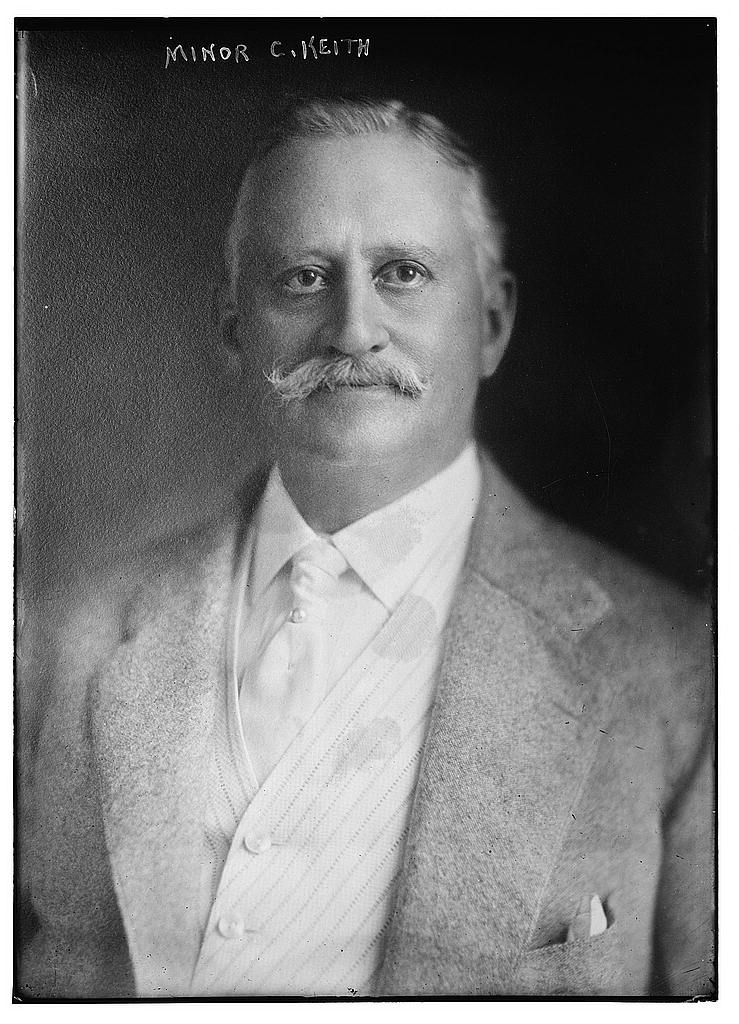
Minor C. Keith, American banana planter and businessman

In the mid-1870s, to manage the new industrial-agriculture business enterprise in the countries of Central America, Keith founded the Tropical Trading and Transport Company: one-half of what would later become the United Fruit Company (UFC), later Chiquita Brands International, created in 1899 by merger with the Boston Fruit Company, owned by Andrew Preston. By the 1930s, the international political and economic tensions created by the United Fruit Company enabled the corporation to control 80–90% of the banana business in the U.S.

By the late 19th century, the American multinational corporation United Fruit Company dominated the cultivation, harvesting, and exportation of bananas. They furthermore controlled the road, rail, and port infrastructure of Honduras, exercising their influence as elites in Honduras. In the northern coastal areas near the Caribbean Sea, the Honduran government ceded to the banana companies 500 hectares per kilometre (2,000 acre/mi) of laid railroad along, despite there being neither passenger nor freight railroad service through Tegucigalpa, the capital city. Among the Honduran people, the United Fruit Company was known as El Pulpo ("The Octopus" in English). This name stems from the UFC's influence pervading Honduran society, controlling their country's transport infrastructure, and manipulating Honduran national politics with anti-labour violence.

In 1924, despite the UFC monopoly, the Vaccaro brothers established the Standard Fruit Company (later the Dole Food Company) to export Honduran bananas to the U.S. port of New Orleans. The fruit-exporting corporations kept U.S. prices low by legalistic manipulation of Central American national land use laws to cheaply buy large tracts of prime agricultural land for corporate banana plantations in the republics of the Caribbean Basin, the Central American isthmus, and tropical South America; the American fruit companies then employed the dispossessed Central and South American and Caribbean populations as low-wage employees.

By the 1930s, the United Fruit Company owned 1,400,000 hectares (3.5 million acres) of land in Central America and the Caribbean and was the single largest landowner in Guatemala. Such holdings gave it great power over the governments of small countries, one of the factors confirming the suitability of the phrase "banana republic".

=== Honduras ===
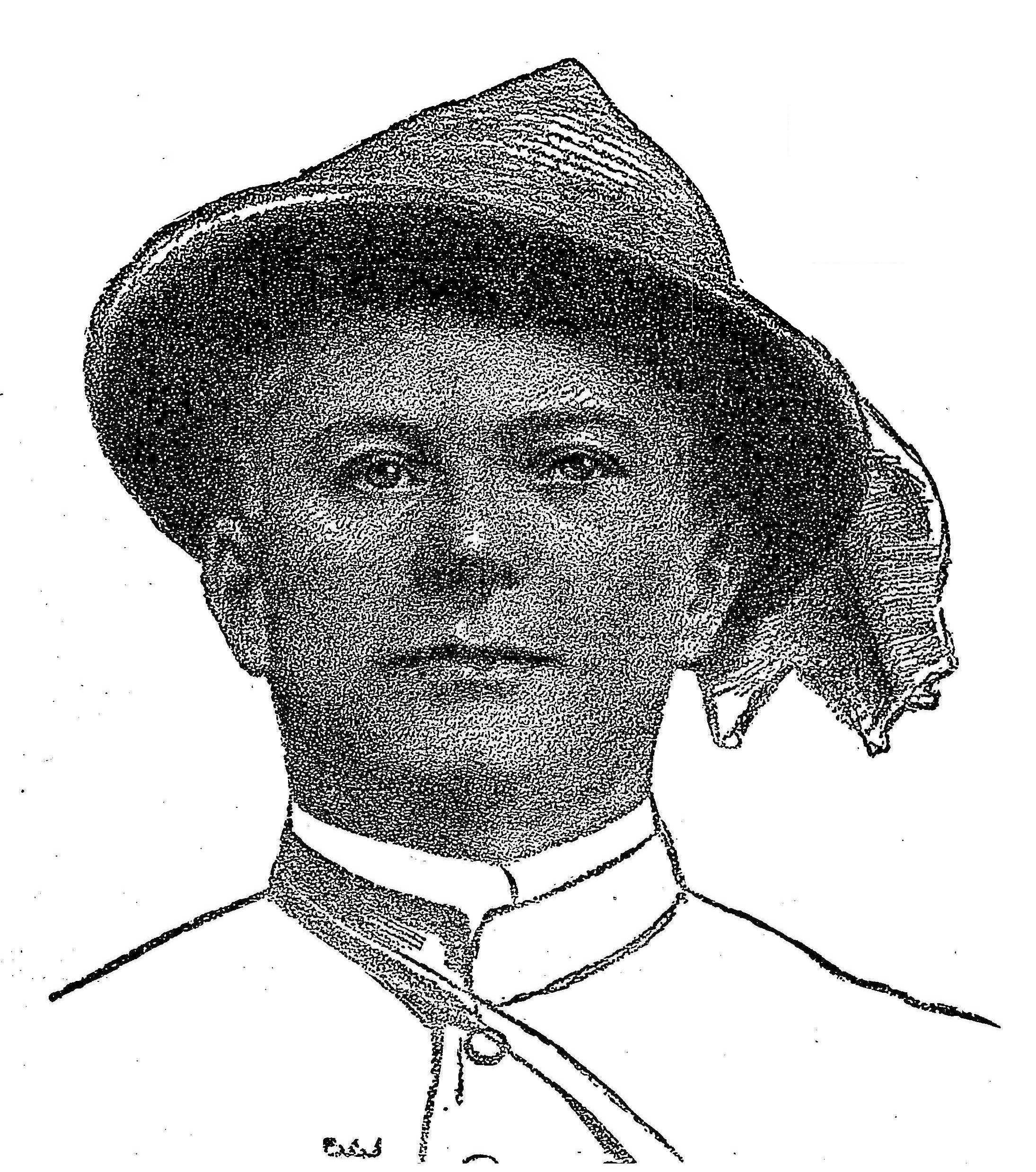
In 1912, for the Cuyamel Fruit Company, American mercenary "general" Lee Christmas overthrew the civil government of Honduras to install a military government friendly to foreign businesses.

In the early 20th century, Moldovan-American businessman Sam Zemurray (founder of the Cuyamel Fruit Company) was instrumental in establishing the "banana republic" stereotype. He entered the banana-export business by buying overripe bananas from the United Fruit Company to sell in New Orleans. In 1910, Zemurray bought 6,075 hectares (15,000 acres) in the Caribbean coast of Honduras for use by the Cuyamel Fruit Company. In 1911, Zemurray conspired with Manuel Bonilla, an ex-president of Honduras (1904–1907), and American mercenary Lee Christmas, to overthrow the civil government of Honduras and install a military government friendly to foreign businesses.

The mercenary army of the Cuyamel Fruit Company, led by Christmas, effected a coup d'état against President Miguel R. Dávila (1907–1911) and installed Bonilla (1912–1913). The United States ignored the deposition of the elected government of Honduras by a private army, justified by the U.S. State Department's misrepresenting Dávila as too politically liberal and a poor businessman whose management had indebted Honduras to Great Britain. This was a geopolitically unacceptable circumstance in light of the Monroe Doctrine. The coup d'état was a consequence of the Dávila government's having slighted the Cuyamel Fruit Company by colluding with the rival United Fruit Company to award them a monopoly contract for the Honduran banana in exchange for the UFC's brokering of U.S. government loans to Honduras.

The political instability consequent to the coup d'état stalled the Honduran economy, and the unpayable external debt (c. US$4 billion) of Honduras was excluded from access to international investment capital. That financial deficit perpetuated Honduran economic stagnation and perpetuated the image of Honduras as a banana republic. The inherited foreign debt functionally undermined the Honduran government, which allowed foreign corporations to manage the country and become sole employers of the Honduran people. The American fruit companies controlled the economic infrastructure (road, rail, and port, telegraph and telephone) they had built in Honduras.

The U.S. dollar went on to become the legal-tender currency of Honduras; Christmas became commander of the Honduran Army, and later was appointed U.S. Consul to Honduras. 23 years later, after corporate interest among the American businessmen, Zemurray assumed control of the rival United Fruit Company in 1933.

=== Guatemala ===
Guatemala contains the regional socio-economic legacy of a 'banana republic': inequitably distributed agricultural land and natural wealth, uneven economic development, and an economy dependent upon a few export crops—usually bananas, coffee, and sugarcane. The inequitable land distribution is an important cause of national poverty, as well as the accompanying sociopolitical discontent and insurrection. Almost 90% of the country's farms are too small to yield adequate subsistence harvests to the farmers. 2% of the country's farms occupy 65% of the arable land as the property of the local oligarchy.

During the 1950s, the United Fruit Company sought to convince the governments of U.S. presidents Harry S. Truman (1945–1953) and Dwight D. Eisenhower (1953–1961) that the popular, elected government of President Jacobo Árbenz of Guatemala was secretly pro-Soviet for having expropriated unused "fruit company lands" to landless peasants. In the Cold War (1945–1991) context of the proactive anti-communist politics exemplified by U.S. senator Joseph McCarthy in the years 1947–1957, geo-political concerns about the security of the Western Hemisphere facilitated Eisenhower's ordering and authorising Operation Success. The U.S. Central Intelligence Agency deposed Árbenz' democratically elected government by means of a coup d'état in 1954, and installed the pro-business government of Colonel Carlos Castillo in its place. Castillo was assassinated by a presidential guard three years later.

A mixed history of elected presidents and puppet-master military juntas were the governments of Guatemala in the course of the 36-year Guatemalan Civil War (1960–1996). However, in 1986, at the 26-year mark, the Guatemalan people promulgated a new political constitution, and elected Vinicio Cerezo (1986–1991) president; then Jorge Serrano Elías (1991–1993).

=== Ecuador ===
In the early 20th century, Ecuador was primarily a cocoa exporting country; however, due to diseases and competition from other exporters, the country sought an alternative crop that could serve as a significant export. Ecuador became a major producer of bananas due to its comparative advantage in fertile lowlands, low labor costs, and skilled workers. Additionally, Ecuador has many environmental advantages, such as a lack of natural disasters and no excess humidity that may allow diseases to fester. The minimal disease prevalence has decreased pesticide costs in Ecuador compared to other banana republic countries. The world's major importer of bananas is the European Union. Ecuador produces its bananas during the European's highest demand season for bananas, which is December through May, further contributing to Ecuador's advantage in the banana market.

Ecuador is the world's largest exporter of bananas, representing over a third of international banana sales, and banana export revenues were a quarter of Ecuador's total value of merchandise exports. Ecuador is considered a banana republic country due to its dependence on the banana and multinational corporations for the functionality of its economy. Still, it differs in a few characteristics of the typical banana republic country. Instead of the major banana corporations that contain large plantations throughout the country, such as Dole, Chiquita, or Del Monte, Ecuador's banana production mainly comes from over five thousand small-holder farmers. Corporations originally established plantations in Ecuador, but issues with switching from the Gros Michel variety to the Cavendish variety, lack of knowledge about this new variety, and an overvalued exchange rate caused the corporations to give production back to independent farmers around the 1960s. Corporations now directly contract smallholder farmers in Ecuador instead of owning their plantations. However, corporations still influence prices paid to producers, pesticide use, and other growing decisions.

There are a variety of actors that participate in the production of bananas in Ecuador. There are groups that provide financial and economic services to fund the independent farmers. Some organizations include the Ecuadorian Central Bank and Banking for Rural and Urban Productive Development. A different set of actors supplies research for producers so they can combat diseases and produce bananas more efficiently. Some examples are the Agrocalidad and phytosanitary regulatory agency, as well as research groups from universities in Ecuador. Lastly, there is a group of actors that are manufacturers, importers, or suppliers of agrochemicals and machinery. Banana exporting countries rely heavily on cartons that transport bananas, supplied by companies such as Industria Cartonera Ecutoriana and Cartonera Pichincha.

== Banana market ==
=== Market structure ===
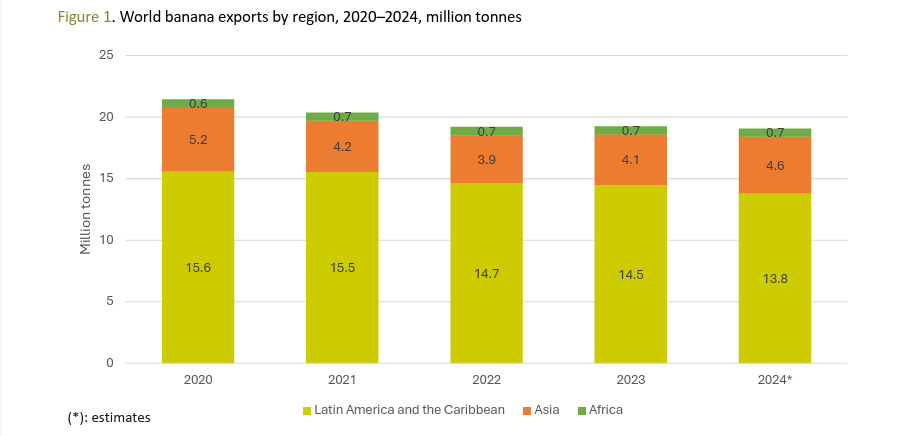
Global banana exports by region

The banana market structure is oligopolistic due to five major corporations having major control over the market. World trade is dominated by Chiquita Brands, Dole Food Company, Del Monte Fresh Produce, Noboa, and Fyffes, who collectively control over three quarters of the banana market. These companies own large plantations or contract independent farmers, have their own distribution systems, and elaborate marketing strategies to contribute to large economies of scale and marketing power. The corporations have immense power due to the large role the banana industry plays in the global economy. The industry produces large amounts of export revenue, and employs thousands of people across production, distribution networks, marketing, and employees in retail stores. Furthermore, four out of the five top banana exporting countries in 2009, which are Ecuador, Colombia, Philippines, Costa Rica, and Guatemala, are considered banana republic countries, with Central and South America and Caribbean accounting for over 83% of world banana exports.

=== Consumer preferences ===
Banana republic countries depend on exports, so consumer preferences play a hefty factor in how bananas are produced. Banana exporting countries face significant losses due to unmarketable bananas. There are certifications bananas can receive to be more appealing for consumers, such as the Fair Trade, Organic, and Rainforest Alliance certifications that market sustainability, fair labor conditions, or different growing methods.

External features taken into consideration include being overripe, having insect damage, being short in size, or containing scarring on the peel. Internal features that cause bananas to be rejected include taste, texture, sweetness, and shelf life. The cavendish variety accomplishes being the preferable banana due to its marketability and is the most common banana on the market. The largest importers of bananas are the United States, Japan, and the European Union. The EU imports the majority of bananas, but also contains regulations on the features of the product. The European Union requires bananas to be free of bruises, unripe and green, with the stalk intact, and the banana itself cannot have abnormal curvature.

== Modern era ==
=== Pesticides ===
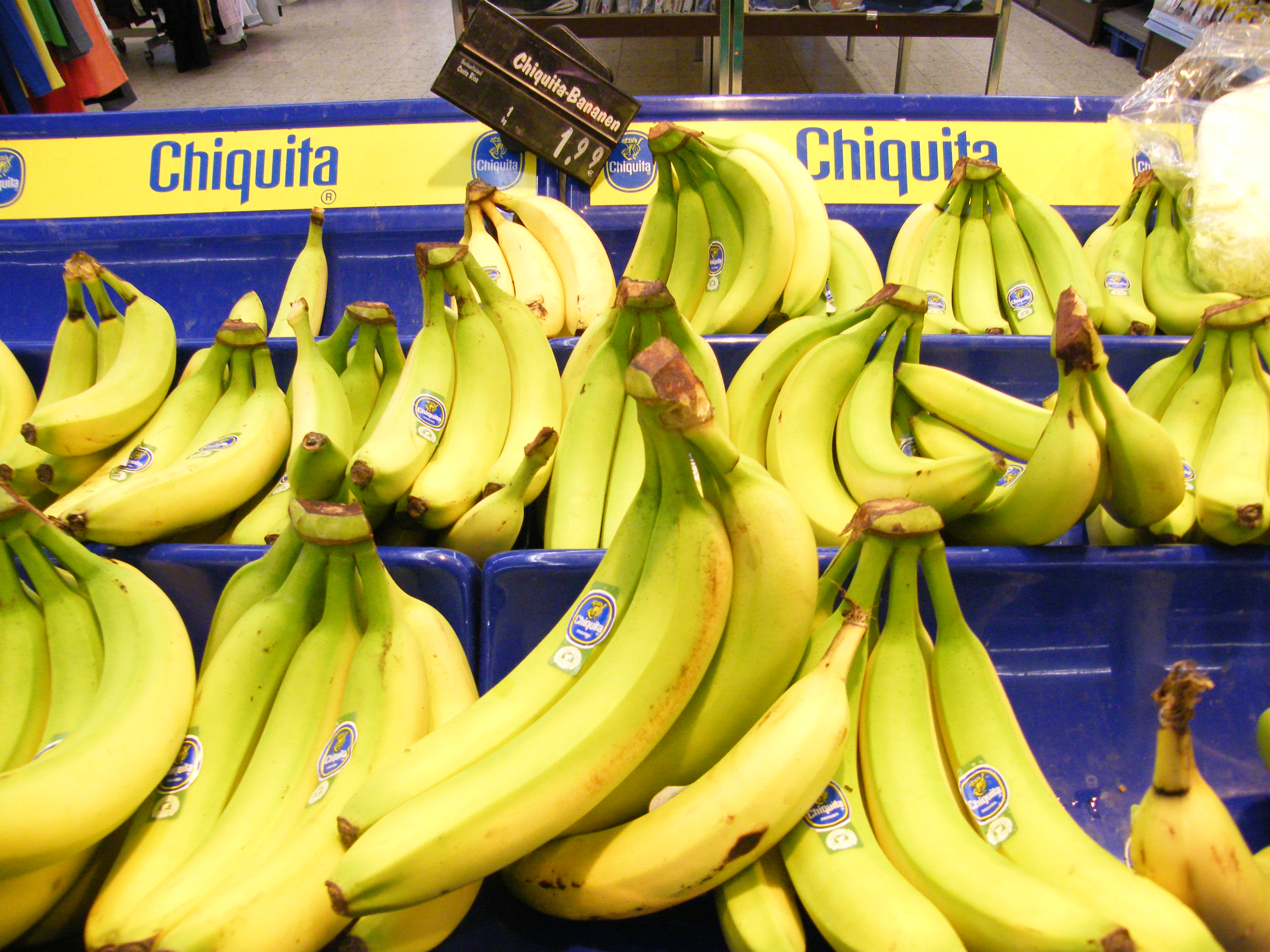
Chiquita bananas

Chiquita Brands International and the Dole Food Company have shifted their focus of maintaining the environments on their plantations and making agriculture more efficient by breeding and growing more resilient versions of foods, such as Cavendish bananas. Both companies have been working to employ better farming practices, especially regarding the use of pesticides, as both companies have received heavy criticism for the amount and effects of the pesticides they have used on their products. Although the pesticides do not generally represent a safety concern for consumers abroad, they can be harmful to residents and the ecosystems in which they are used. Many banana farmers from Central and South America were exposed to dibromochloropropane (DBCP) from the 1960s to 1980s, which can lead to birth defects, elevated risk of cancer, central nervous system damage, and most commonly, infertility.

=== Labour conditions and treatment of workers ===
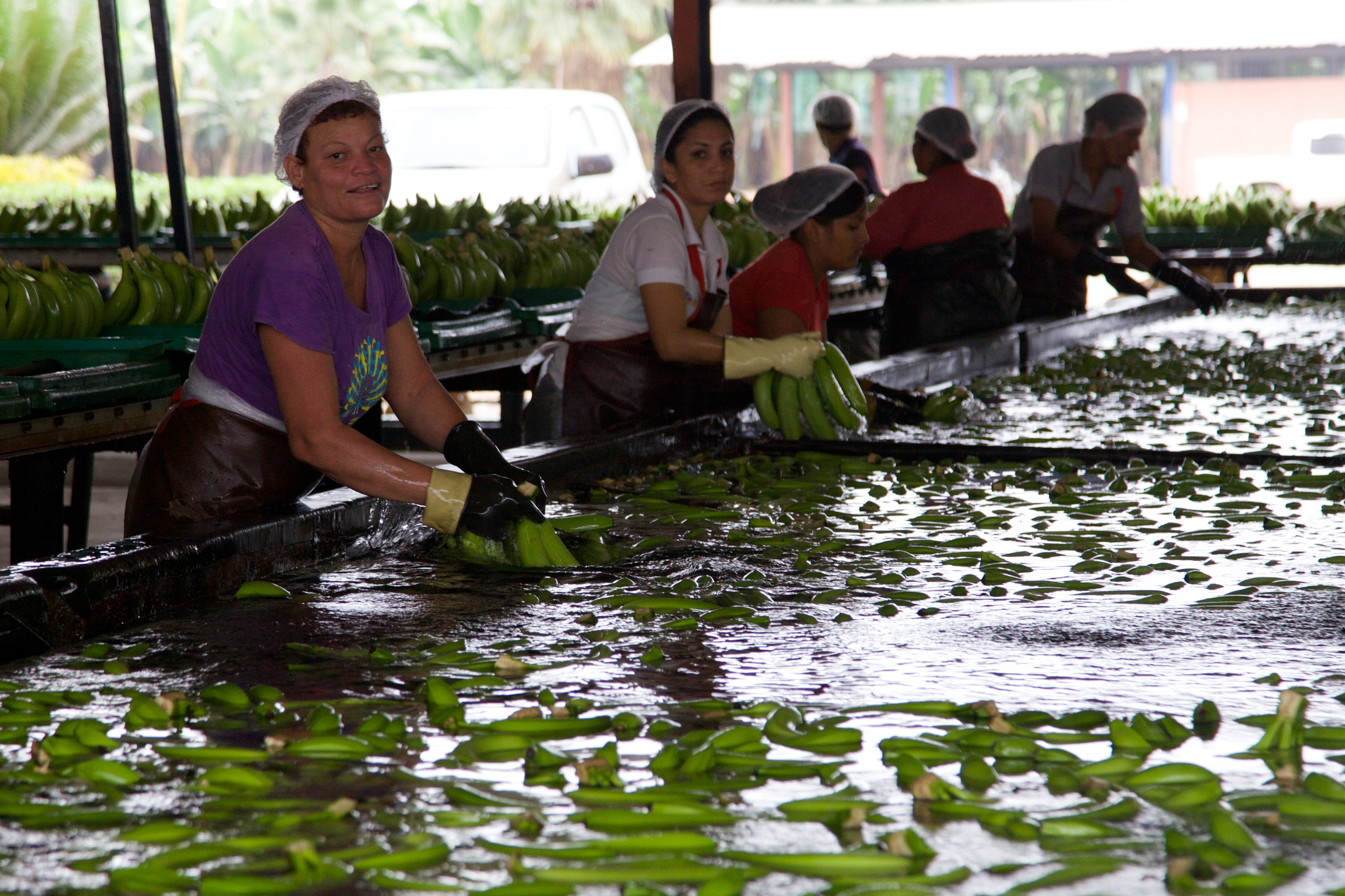
Women cleaning Cavendish bananas for packaging at a plantation in Ecuador (from which most of America's bananas are imported)

Both the Dole Food Company and Chiquita Brands International have argued that their labourers and farmers are being treated much better in the 21st century than they were during the height of the banana republics. While workers do have better conditions than they did during the 20th century, these large corporations allegedly still suppress labour union movements through intimidation and harassment. Working conditions on banana plantations are dangerous, with very low wages and long hours in difficult conditions. The workers are not cared for and are often replaced as they have very little policy about job security in the case of sickness or injury. The plantation workers are also exposed to toxic pesticides on a daily basis, causing harm. Unionists who pressure these corporations for better working conditions are commonly targeted and forced to leave their positions. The workers also receive no benefits, and as the plantations are in countries with lax safety regulations, there are minimal health policies.

=== Women banana workers ===
During the 1970s and 1980s, men migrated to cities for work, leaving women available to work for multinational companies on plantations. Women represent about a fifth of the workforce in the banana industry, and are known as Bananeras, or women workers on banana plantations. Men generally work in the fields while women have jobs that pertain to selecting, washing, and packaging the bananas. Due to a gendered division of labor, women often work more than one job for income. Jobs on banana plantations that pay more are often more physically difficult and are reserved for men. However, there is little difference in the money paid to men and women for the same tasks completed. Women primarily package bananas, where pay is measured by the amount of boxes that are filled with bananas at the end of each day. The roles of packagers depend on the scale of production and ability of the producer to export bananas, so many women are contracted once or twice a week to work.

Women are often excluded from benefiting from agricultural cooperatives because a majority are not landowners and lack power in the decision-making process. There is no trade union to educate women about legal working rights, according to the Coordinating Body of Latin American Banana and Agro-Industrial Unions (COLSIBA). However, gender quotas are being implemented in agricultural programs to advance gender equality and allow women to be beneficiaries of land.

There have been criticisms of women working in direct contact with pesticides, fungicides, herbicides, and insecticides through the application of chemicals and washing bags that contain insecticides. Pregnant and breastfeeding women are particularly affected, as pregnant women will work with chemicals until the later stages of pregnancy and will return to work after the birth. Exposure to pesticides, as well as smoke from tobacco, waste burning, and cooking fuel increase the risks of asthma, rhinitis, and allergic skin conditions. Women banana workers often face the challenge of being a caretaker and bananera, as there is limited access to childcare, limited education and training, and a difficulty of working more than one job. Women are often at risk of sexual assault and domestic violence due to issues in management of Occupational Health, Safety, and Environment.

=== Challenges to the banana republic ===
==== European Union Banana Dispute ====
The European Banana Dispute began as the EU attempted to create a single market, or the General Agreement on Tariffs and Trade (GATT). However, the EU struggled to commit to the initiative while also honoring the Lomé Convention, the "Banana Protocol" in the Treaty of Rome, and honoring the Accession Treaties. The prior treaties were to ensure that economies of former colonies, or African, Caribbean, and Pacific (ACP) countries, would have support. Because of prior obligations to former colonies, the banana market was becoming exempt from GATT. A quota of 2 million bananas from the Americas were allowed in the EU with a 30% tariff while ACP countries received duty-free importation.

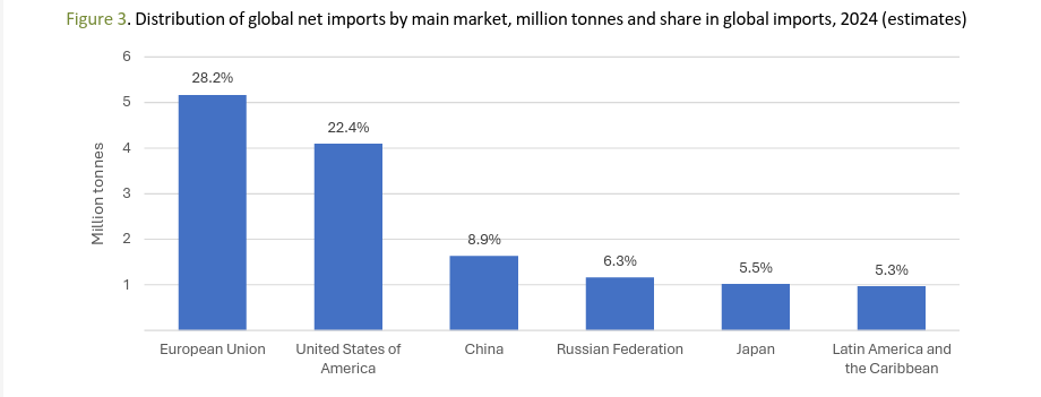
Percentage of global banana imports by region

Five American countries were contracted with the GATT, and argued the preferential tariffs were discriminatory. Three banana republic countries, Ecuador, Guatemala, and Honduras, plus the United States and Mexico challenged the regulations in the World Trade Organization (WTO). American banana exporting countries asked for the EU banana market to have no preferences whatsoever. The WTO arbitration panel ruled that $192 million was owed to the United States for lost banana sales.

The EU Common Market Organization for Bananas was a collection of efforts to regulate the banana market. The EU was aiming to assure that former colonies would get higher prices for their bananas considering their higher production costs, honor the Lomé Convention, and ensure consumers had an adequate supply of bananas from underdeveloped Americas. An agreement was reached in April 2001 between the United States and EU. The EU implemented a system of importation based on historical licensing, with underdeveloped American countries and ACP countries having their own categories of licenses, designated tariffs, and quotas. Chiquita Brands and Dole Food Company together share 44% of the licenses.

==== Prevalent diseases ====
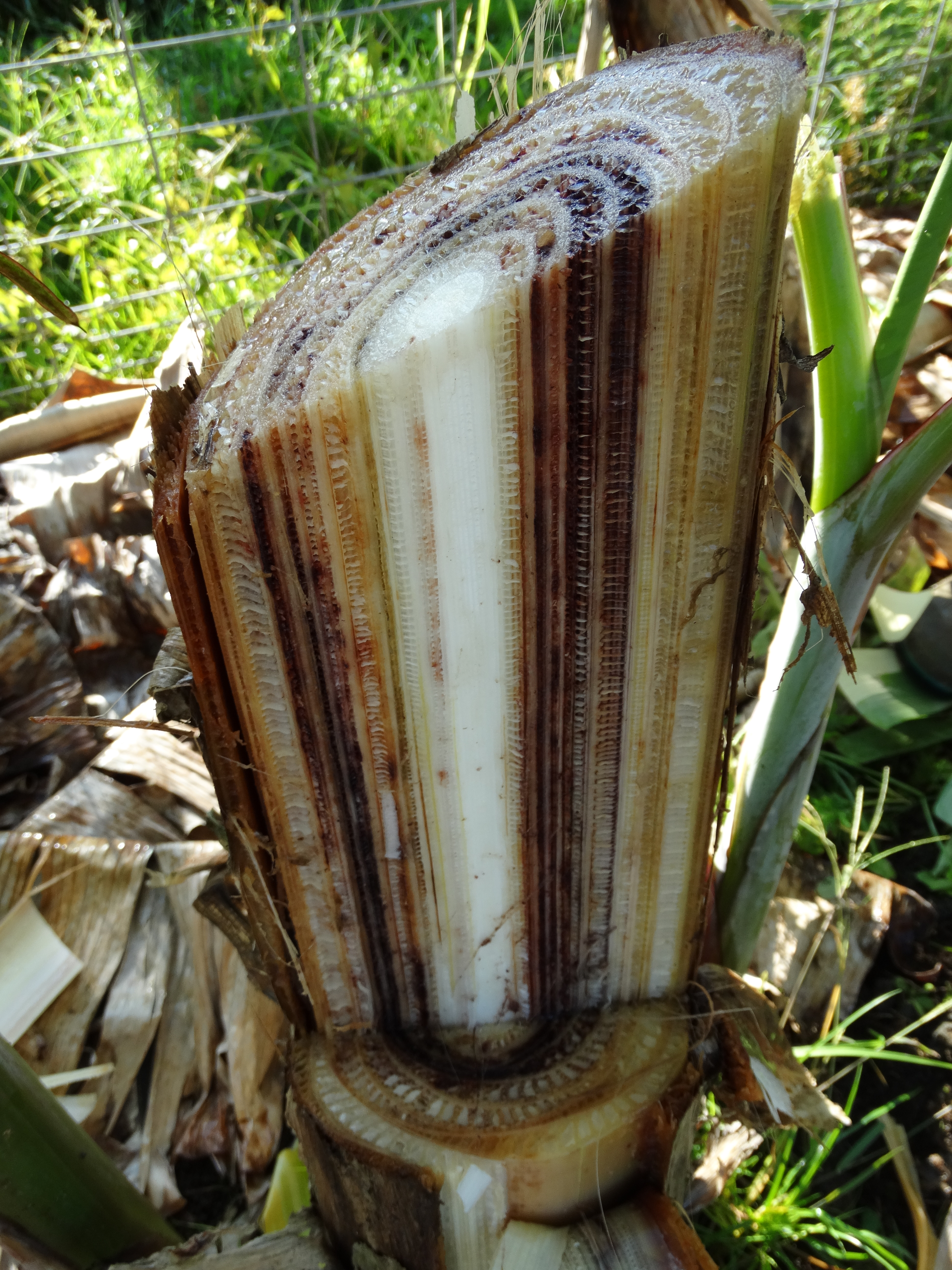
Banana stalk infected with Fusarium Wilt

Diseases such as the Panama Disease (fusarium wilt), black sigatoka leaf spot, black leaf streak disease, banana bunchy top disease, Cardano, and Moko disease create challenges for banana republic countries as they generate massive losses for banana farms. Diseases in banana production produce more production costs than any other biotic factor. Fusarium wilt can survive for over thirty years in the soil, threatening a rapid spread of disease as infected soil can be found on tires, shoes, tools, run-off water, and irrigation systems.

The most popular banana on the commercial market is the Cavendish banana, a type of banana with no genetic variation to other bananas of its variety. The cavendish is not seeded, and propagates by producing vegetative suckers that can be removed from the parents and planted separately. New sprouts are clones of the parent plant, unless they have a genetic mutation, making them more susceptible to disease. The most popular banana before the Cavendish, the Gros Michel variety, was wiped out by Panama disease due to a lack of genetic evolution to become more resistant to the disease.

The primary solution used are pesticides and agrochemicals. However, many pesticides have various negative effects on health, the environment, and economy. Pesticides and other chemicals to ward off disease also account for almost a third of production costs on banana farms. Others have proposed genetic engineering, but it is a controversial topic. Other solutions include removal of affected leaves, but this can affect the period when bananas are harvested for export, known as the green period. Management systems can also be improved so communication is clear between farmers and different levels of government about the spread of diseases.

== In art ==
=== Poetry ===
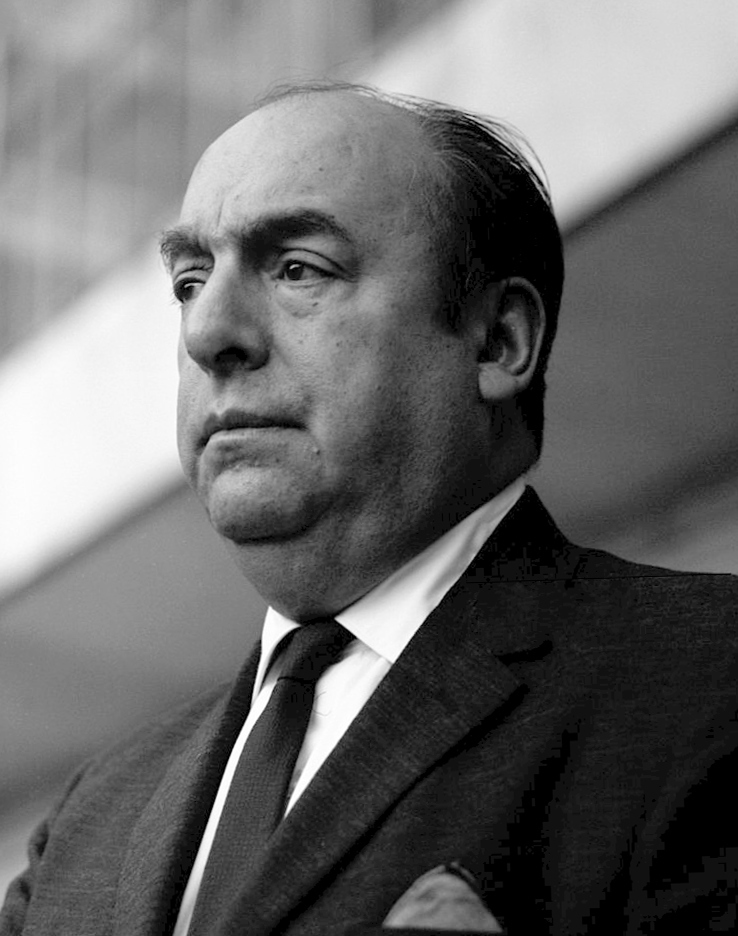
In his poem "La United Fruit Co.", Pablo Neruda denounced the corporate subjugation of underdeveloped Americas.

In his book Canto General (General Song, 1950), Chilean poet Pablo Neruda (1904–73) denounced foreign corporate political dominance of Central and South American countries with the four-stanza poem "La United Fruit Co."; the second-stanza reading in part:

... The Fruit Company, Inc.
Reserved for itself the most succulent,
The central coast of my own land,
The delicate waist of the Americas.

It rechristened its territories
As the "Banana Republics",
And over the sleeping dead,
Over the restless heroes
Who brought about the greatness,
The liberty and the flags,
It established a comic opera ...

=== Novels ===
The novel One Hundred Years of Solitude (1967), by Gabriel García Márquez, depicts the imperialistic capitalism of foreign fruit companies as voracious socio-economic exploitation of natural resources of the fictional South American town of Macondo and its people. Domestically, the corrupt national government of Macondo abets the business policies and labour practices of the foreign corporations, which brutally oppress the workers. In the novel, a specific scene depicts the real-life 1928 Banana Massacre, related to the death of workers who struck against poor conditions in banana plantations in Colombia.

== Modern interpretations ==
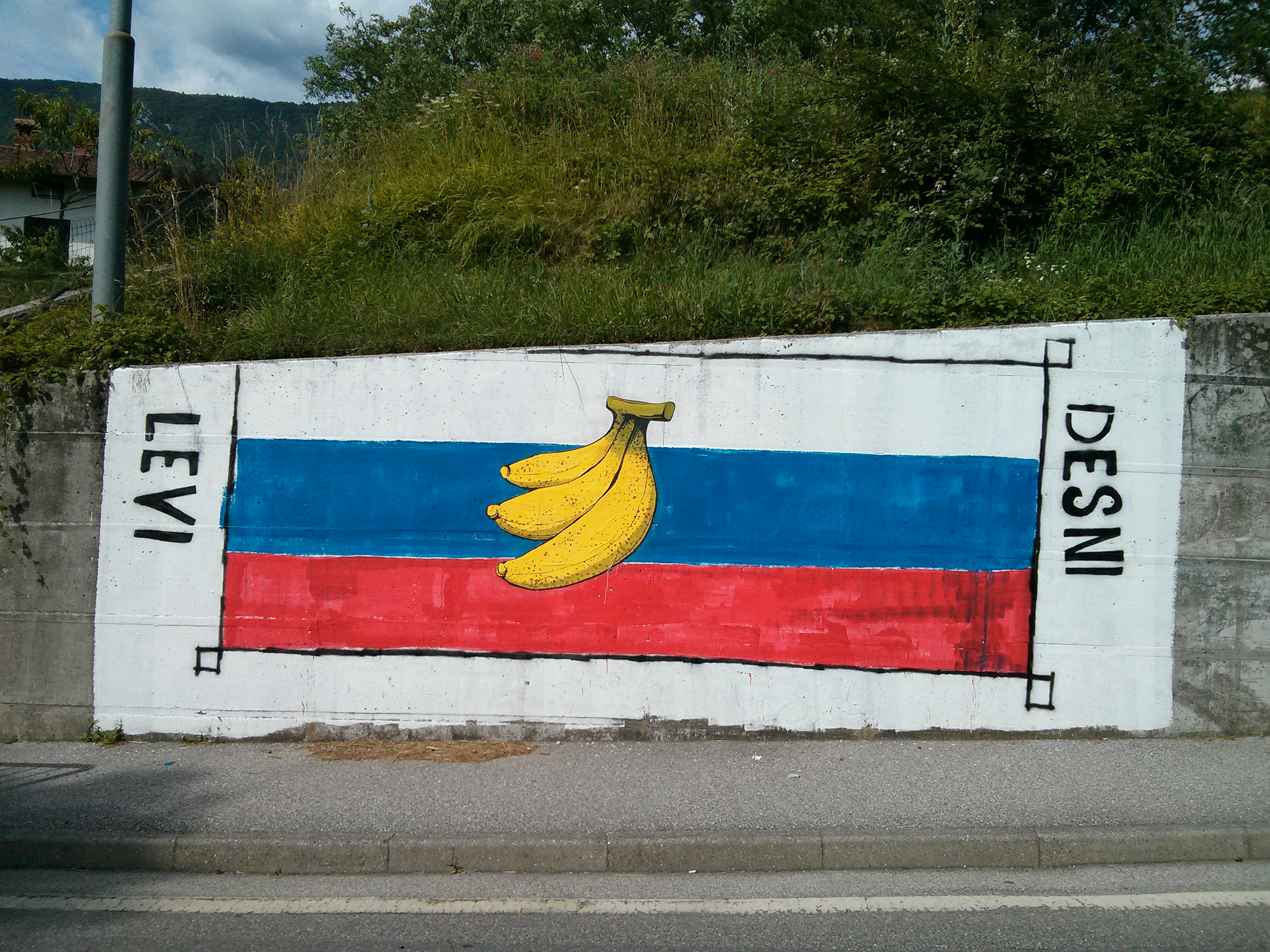
Graffiti implying "banana republic of Slovenia"

=== United States ===
The Kingdom of Hawaii, now the U.S. state of Hawaii, was once an independent country under political pressure from American sugar plantation owners, who in 1887 forced King Kalākaua to write a new constitution that benefited American businessmen at the expense of the working class. This constitution is known as the "Bayonet Constitution" due to its threat of force. In the case of Hawaii, the U.S. was also interested in the strategic military significance of the islands, leasing Pearl Harbor and later acquiring Hawaii as a territory.

=== Post-colonial states ===
Countries that obtained independence from colonial powers in the 20th century have, at times, tended to share traits of banana republics due to the influence of large private corporations in politics; examples include the Maldives (resort companies) and the Philippines (the tobacco industry, the U.S. government, and corporations).

On 14 May 1986, then Australian Treasurer Paul Keating stated that Australia might become a banana republic. This has received both commentary and criticism and is seen as part of a turning point in Australia's political and economic history.

=== Pakistan ===
In March 2023, PTI Chairman and former prime minister of Pakistan Imran Khan said his country had "become a banana republic".

== See also ==
- Failed state
- Junta, a tabletop simulation game of a banana republic
- Resource curse
