= Zemurray Gardens Lodge Complex =

- U.S. National Register of Historic Places
- Location within Louisiana
- Nearest city: Loranger
- Coordinates: 30°37′30″N 90°19′53″W
- Area: 22.879 acres (9.259 ha)
- Built: c.1925
- Architectural style: Bungalow/craftsman
- NRHP reference No.: 83003637
- Added to NRHP: 1983-10-03

The Zemurray Gardens Lodge Complex, in Tangipahoa Parish, Louisiana near Loranger, Louisiana, was built around 1925. It was listed on the National Register of Historic Places in 1983.

== History ==
The earliest record held in Tangipahoa Parish describes an act of sale in the year 1822 as "the section of land on which Nathan Joiner now lives and was originally settled by Thomas Joiner." The Joiner family are believed to have first settled the property sometime in the 1790s. Further records from the Tangipahoa parish courthouse show that a man named Alfred Hennen purchased the Zemurray property sometime in 1828, in two different land sales, one 640-acre piece was purchased from William Cooper and another 640-acre plot from Moses Moore. The Hennen family built a large home on the property and is believed to be the source of the present structure.

The following is an excerpt from the National Register of Historic Places nomination:

The land now occupied by Zemurray Gardens was one of the earliest settled areas in what is now Tangipahoa Parish and was described in an 1822 act of sale as "the section of land on which Nathan Joiner now lives and was originally settled by Thomas Joiner." The Joiners are believed to have first settled it in the 1790s. In 1828 Alfred Hennen, a distinguished Louisianian purchased 1280 acres, an area later increased by him and by subsequent owners, In 1829 Hennen built a house here, believed to be the basis of the present structure. Alfred Hennen was one of the founders of the First Presbyterian Church in New Orleans-and was active in the establishment of a Presbyterian Church and school at Pine Grove near his plantation. He took part in the development of the railroad through St, Tammany Parish, He also developed the cultivation of rice on his St, Tammany property and by 1860 was the third largest rice producer in Louisiana and the owner of 117 slaves in the parish. Hennen was a prominent member of the legal profession in Louisiana, beginning his practice in 1807 when he first settled there.

— Robert B, DeBlieux, State Historic Preservation Officer, "National Register of Historic Places Inventory - Nomination Form" 1983

The land title changed during the following years through various heirs and relatives. In one of the transactions the land was called "Hennen Retreat". In March 1888, the property of Ann Morris Hennen was auctioned to John Albert Morris of Westchester County, New York. The property was then donated to a man named Dave Morris and was renamed "Morris Retreat". Then in the year 1918, the property was sold to the Lake Superior Piling Corporation and was renamed "Holtonwood". Charles and William Holton, the new owners of the company renovated and greatly improved the property.

== Samuel Zemurray ==
Sometime in October 1928, Samuel Zemurray from New Orleans, the president of the United Fruit Company at that time, purchased the property. Howard Schilling, a local parish farmer, was employed to manage the project. His wife Sarah Zemurray, an admirer of flowers instructed Schilling to plant many rows of azaleas and camellias along the forest trails. Samuel Zemurray saw the beauty created and decided to expand the project. Over the subsequent years, the gardens increased in beauty with a majestic scenery. In the mid-1900s, the Zemurray family hired a notable architect from New Orleans named Moise Goldstein and interior designer George Gallup to improve the property. Each spring, hundreds of tourists and people from the surrounding areas would travel to the garden.

== Joiner Cemetery ==
The National Register nomination describes it as a narrow wooded driveway that leads from the highway to the garden entrance. Near the entrance to the garden is a small cemetery barely visible with a towering white monument. The inscription on the monument reads, "Nathan Joiner and Wife, First Settlers In the Home Place".

It is located about 12 miles (19 km) northeast of Hammond on Zemurray Garden Drive.
