= Health in Honduras =

The fertility rate was approximately 3.7 per woman in Honduras in 2009. The under-five mortality rate is at 40 per 1,000 live births. The health expenditure was US$197 per person in 2004. There are about 57 physicians per 100,000 people.

Life expectancy at birth was 78 for females in 2016 and for males 73.

The Human Rights Measurement Initiative finds that Honduras is fulfilling 92.2% of what it should be fulfilling for the right to health based on its level of income. When looking at the right to health with respect to children, Honduras achieves 98.6% of what is expected based on its current income. In regards to the right to health amongst the adult population, the country achieves only 91.3% of what is expected based on the nation's level of income. Honduras falls into the <<fair>> category when evaluating the right to reproductive health because the nation is fulfilling 86.8% of what the nation is expected to achieve based on the resources (income) it has available.

== Social Determinants of Health ==
In 2010, 64% of households had waste collection services. The majority of municipalities have garbage dumps that pollute the soil, air, and water. The country's high levels of income inequality are reflected in a Gini coefficient of 0.54 for 2013. In 2012, one out of five Hondurans lived on less than US$1.90 a day. In 2013, 65% of households were living below the poverty line and 43% were living in extreme poverty. The economically active population was 44.0% in 2014, and 5.3% of the active population was unemployed. The 88% of the population who were over the age of 15 had an average of 7.5 years of schooling, although coverage of secondary education was less than 30%. In 2015, 91.2% of the population had access to clean drinking water, while 82.6% had access to basic sanitation. People over 60 tend to suffer from poorer social and health conditions as well as loss of functional abilities that prevent further action to good health and well-being . Approximately 46.6% do not have any formal schooling, and 79.7% lack social security coverage. Some 44.5% of the population aged 60–69 live in extreme poverty, a figure that increases to 51.2% among people aged 70–79.

=== Health Situations ===
In 2007–2012, the infant mortality rate was 24 deaths per 1,000 live births. The leading causes of death were perinatal disorders, congenital malformations, pneumonia, diarrhea, and child malnutrition. The under-5 mortality rate was 29 deaths per 1,000 live births. In 2011–2012, the prevalence of chronic malnutrition was 23% in children under 5, with higher rates in the children of mothers without schooling and from poor households. Some 34% of the population over 20 is overweight and 21% is obese, while 18.7% of adolescents aged 13–15 are overweight and 5.4% are obese. The prevalence of disability in the population was 4.4% in people over 10 years of age in 2012. In 2013–2014, 6.4% of disabilities were severe. In 2013, the reported maternal mortality ratio was 86 deaths per 100,000 live births. Institutional delivery coverage was 83%. In 2013, 19% of deaths were caused by perinatal disorders, 18% by circulatory system diseases, and 10% by respiratory system diseases. Immunization coverage in the population under 1 year in 2015 was 100% for BCG, 99% for poliomyelitis, 100% for rotavirus, 99% for the pentavalent vaccine, and 99% for pneumococcus. In the population aged 12–23 months, measles immunization coverage was 98%. Dengue is endemic in Honduras, and the largest outbreak in the past 10 years occurred in 2010. Chikungunya virus was introduced in 2014, causing an epidemic that peaked at 1,057 cases per 100,000 population in 2015. Zika virus was introduced into the country at the end of that year. Malaria transmission has fallen sharply in Honduras over the past decade. However, 921 cases were reported in 2015, a 56% increase over the previous year. A total of 2,060 cases of leishmaniasis were reported in 2015. In 2014, there were 48 reported cases of Chagas disease transmitted by trypanosoma cruzi in children under 15 and 58 cases in the population aged 15 and over. In 2015, the prevalence of human immunodeficiency virus (HIV) was 0.4% in the population aged 15–49, transmitted mainly by heterosexual contact. The reported tuberculosis rate was 32 cases per 100,000 population. The prevalence of diabetes mellitus in the adult population is 7.4%, and the prevalence of hypertension is 22.6%.

=== Challenges ===
The Government has identified the following health challenges: (i) restructuring the MoH to strengthen its steering role and implement the separation of functions; (ii) implementing the Results-based Management Monitoring and Evaluation System, thereby strengthening the Integrated Health Information System; (iii) developing public policies that promote healthy habits and lifestyles; (iv) implementing the International Health Regulations; (v) monitoring compliance with the Framework Convention on Tobacco Control; (vi) retrofitting infrastructure to achieve optimal operation of the health services network; (vii) conducting research on indigenous and Afro-descendant populations to learn about evidence-based interventions; (viii) hiring relevant, high quality human talent in the necessary numbers, especially to strengthen the first level of care and ensure the continuity of the model; and (ix) strengthening activities to ensure quality care and patient safety in health facilities.

== Healthcare ==
Expenditure on health was 8.7% of GDP in 2014. Only 2.9% of the population is covered by private health insurance.

The health system consists of a public and a private sector. The former includes the Ministry of Health and the Honduras Social Security Institute . The Ministry serves the entire population in its own facilities staffed by its own physicians and nurses, but it is estimated that only 50%-60% of Hondurans regularly use these services. The Institute covers 40% of employed economically active individuals and their dependents, using its own and contracted facilities. The private sector serves some 10%-15% of the population: those who can afford to pay or are covered by private insurance. An estimated 17% of Hondurans do not have regular access to health services. Total per capita health expenditure was US$212 in 2014, representing 8.72% of GDP. Public spending amounted to 4.4% of GDP whilst out-of-pocket spending made up 50% of total health expenditure. The National Health Model, approved in 2013, emphasizes primary health care. The Directorate-General of Human Resources Development, also created that year, is responsible for health worker development. In 2013, the country had 10.0 physicians, 3.8 nurses, and 0.3 dentists per 1,000 population. In 2015, health services management was decentralized in 82 municipalities across 15 departments in the country, covering a population of 1,337,874. The National Health Model has guided the implementation of 500 primary health care teams serving rural and remote areas of the country. The teams, each consisting of a physician, a nurse, and a health promoter, give priority to communities living in extreme poverty, environmentally vulnerable conditions, and situations of violence. By mid-2015, a total of 367 teams were already working in the field and serving 1.4 million people, promoting qualitative improvements in their attitudes and habits. In 2014, the MoH created the Information Management Unit, which is responsible for ensuring that information is accurate, timely, and appropriate for health planning, organization, direction, control, and evaluation.

=== Achievements and Perspectives ===
Prior to 2015, there was no law that legally defined the national health care model or mechanisms for regulating it. That year, the National Congress approved the Framework Law on Social Protection, which establishes a new modality for social protection. The law envisages a unified universal public health insurance system with coordinated benefits and services provided by the contributory and subsidized systems. The new model encourages a diversity of participating sectors and entities, with clear separation of the system's functions. This will require a new and improved organizational structure for social security that strengthens its steering role, the creation of a health oversight agency, and designation of the IHSS as the insurer of the national health system. More effective application of the model also requires further improvement of public health service management and greater human resource development. Efforts are being made to promote and strengthen multisectoral partnerships and the generation of evidence for the Health in All Policies approach, especially in relation to noncommunicable diseases and injuries due to external causes. Further development of national capacity and competencies for measuring equity and inequalities in health is also necessary, as is effective implementation of the human rights and gender/ethnic equality approaches.

The Honduran Social Security Institute which runs the national public health system was established in 1959. People generally had to travel to Tegucigalpa to access services. In the 1970s a medical center in San Pedro Sula was opened. Services were not available until 1992 in El Progreso. The Ministry of Health in Honduras provides care to almost 90% of the population, but there is still little provision for the rural population, and there is a serious shortage of doctors. The ratio of doctor to population in 1984 was one to 1,510. In 2015, there were 10,995 registered doctors. From 2013 there was a new focus on providing more coverage to rural and poor areas and emphasized preventative care and maintenance as a way to improve public health and this has produced some improvement.

=== Facilities ===
There are now 7 national hospitals, located in Tegucigalpa and San Pedro Sula, 6 regional hospitals, 16 area hospitals, 436 Rural Health Centers (CESAMO), 1,078 Health Centers with Physician and Dentistry (CESAR), 74 maternal and child clinics, 3 peripheral emergency clinics (CLIPER) and 15 dental school centers (CEO).

==== Public hospitals ====
The Public hospitals include:

- Maria Hospital for Paediatric Specialties in Tegucigalpa was opened in 2014.
- Hospital Escuela is the main teaching hospital for the Universidad Nacional Autónoma de Honduras School of Medicine in Tegucigalpa. It has 1025 beds. It has a specialist plastic surgery department.
- Hospital Mario Catarino Rivas in San Pedro Sula opened in 1989. It has 377 beds.
- Hospital Atlántida Integrado in La Ceiba was funded by a donation from South Korea.
- Hospital de Area Roatán
- Hospital Militar Luis Alonso Discua in Comayagüela opened in 1992. It offers services to members of the armed forces and their families.

==== Private hospitals ====
The Private hospitals include:

- Hospital Viera in Tegucigalpa, opened in 1935
- Hospital La Policlínica Tegucigalpa
- Hospital Centro Medico Tegucigalpa
- Hospital Honduras Medical Center Tegucigalpa
- Hospital Del Valle San Pedro Sula
- Hospital Centro Médico Sampedrano San Pedro Sula
- Hospital Vicente D'Antoni, in La Ceiba
- Wood Medical Center Roatán

== See also ==
- Lists of hospitals in North America
