= Loranger, Louisiana =

Unincorporated community in Louisiana

- Unincorporated community
- Location within Louisiana Location within the United States
- Coordinates: 30°38′09″N 90°23′53″W
- Country: United States
- State: Louisiana
- Parish: Tangipahoa
- Elevation: 112 ft (34 m)

Population (2019)
  - Total: 7,232
  - Density: 85/sq mi (33/km^{2})
- Time zone: UTC-6 (Central (CST))
  - Summer (DST): UTC-5 (CDT)
- Postal code: 70446
- Area code: 985
- GNIS feature ID: 555164
- FIPS code: 22-45635

Loranger (pronounced La-RAHN-jer) is an unincorporated community in Tangipahoa Parish, Louisiana, United States. Loranger is located north of Hammond, Louisiana, at the junction of LA 40 and LA 1062.

The Loranger Elementary School, Loranger Middle School, and Loranger High School each serve a wide geographic range of families living in and around the very rural Loranger area. The Loranger School District is bordered by the school districts of Folsom, Amite, Independence, and Hammond.

== Historic places ==
The Loranger Methodist Church was built in 1915 and was lit by kerosene lanterns with a stable behind the church to accommodate horses. During the Great Depression the basement was used to teach the villagers how to preserve food.

The Zemurray Gardens Lodge Complex is a 171-acre garden full of azalea, camellia and dogwood trees. It was listed on the National Register of Historic Places on October 3, 1983.

== Notable persons ==
- Rusty Chambers, former professional football player - led the Miami Dolphins in tackles in 1978 and 1979.
- Wade Miley, Major League Baseball player.
- Lindsey Pelas, an American actress, social media influencer, entrepreneur, and model.
