= Cuyamel River =

- Native name: Rio Cuyamel (Spanish)

Location
- Country: Honduras

Physical characteristics
- Mouth: Gulf of Honduras in the Atlantic Ocean
  - location: Puerto Barrios
  - elevation: 0 m (0 ft)

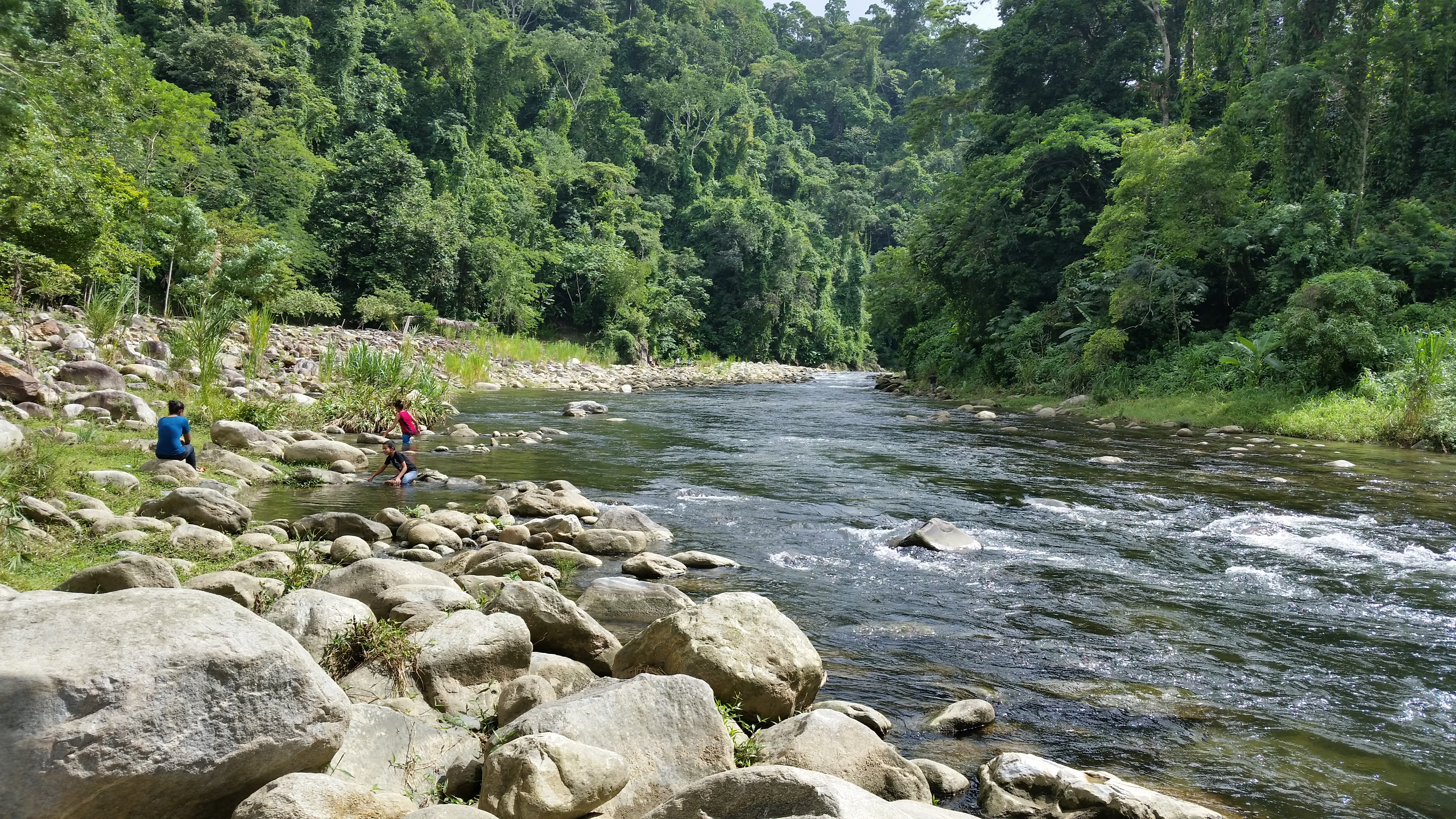
Cuyamel River

The Cuyamel River flows past the city of Cuyamel, Honduras and into an off branch of the Motagua River that marks the boundary between Honduras and Guatemala. American businessman Sam Zemurray purchased his first banana plantation along this river and named his company Cuyamel Fruit Company after it. A proposed dam on the river was approved by the Honduran National Congress in 2014, but has run into local opposition and has not yet been built.
