= Raymone Bain =

American businesswoman

Raymone K. Bain is a public relations and public affairs executive. She has worked in corporate, entertainment, politics, government, and sports environments, representing celebrities and sports figures such as Michael Jackson, Mike Tyson, Muhammad Ali, Serena Williams, Janet Jackson, Kenneth "Babyface" Edmonds, and Boyz II Men. She was former spokesperson, personal general manager to Michael Jackson, and President/COO of the Michael Jackson Company.

== Career ==
Bain began her career representing boxer Héctor Camacho in a dispute with Don King. She was one of the first women to own a sports management firm, The Bain Group, eventually representing Marvelous Marvin Hagler, Muhammad Ali, Thomas Hearns, and Mike Tyson. She became Marion Barry's spokesperson in 1991, then press secretary during his 1994 mayoral campaign in Washington D.C. and afterwards during his term as mayor. She has also represented Serena Williams, Janet Jackson, Babyface, and Boyz II Men, as well as comedians Steve Harvey, Bernie Mac, and Cedric "The Entertainer," D.L. Hughley.

Bain was the media liaison of Michael Jackson during his 2005 trial. She was sacked, then reinstated mid trial. In 2006, Jackson named Bain as his personal general manager and president/COO of the Michael Jackson Company. He subsequently appointed her to the board of directors of Sony/ATV Music Publishing; as his music licensing agent for MIJAC, MIRAN and Sony/ATV Music; as trustee of MJ Publishing Trust; and made her a 10% owner of The Michael Jackson Company, as well as appointing her to the company's board of directors. In October 2006, Michael Jackson was quoted saying that he trusted Bain implicitly. In 2009, Bain sued the Michael Jackson company for $44 million in a breach of contract suit. It was later rejected, despite appeal.

As a result of failing to pay income taxes from 2006 through to 2008, in June 2011 Bain pleaded guilty to one count of failure to file federal income tax returns and one count of failure to file District of Columbia income tax returns. She was given five years probation and a court order to repay over $200,000 in restitution.

== Political work ==
Bain worked as a volunteer in the Jimmy Carter 1976 presidential campaign while majoring in Political Science at Spelman College and worked at the White House as special assistant in the Office of Management and Budget after graduation at the age of 21. She graduated in law from Georgetown University Law Center in Washington, D.C., in December, 1983. She later lobbied to make Martin Luther King's birthday a national holiday. Bain worked in the Bill Clinton 1992 and Bill Clinton 1996 presidential campaigns, securing and supervising celebrity surrogate speakers, and was a member of the 1992 Clinton Presidential Inaugural Committee.

From 2007 to 2008 she was a member of the National Finance Committee for Hillary Rodham-Clinton for President, and later a fundraiser for the National Obama For America Presidential Campaign. She has worked with the International AIDS Trust, and is a founding board member of the Recreation Wish List Committee, founded by the wife of Marion Barry, Cora Masters Barry. She is currently on the Board of Directors of the Marion Barry, Jr. Legacy Committee. Bain is spokesperson for Cora Masters Barry.
