= Sam Zemurray =

American businessman (1877–1961)

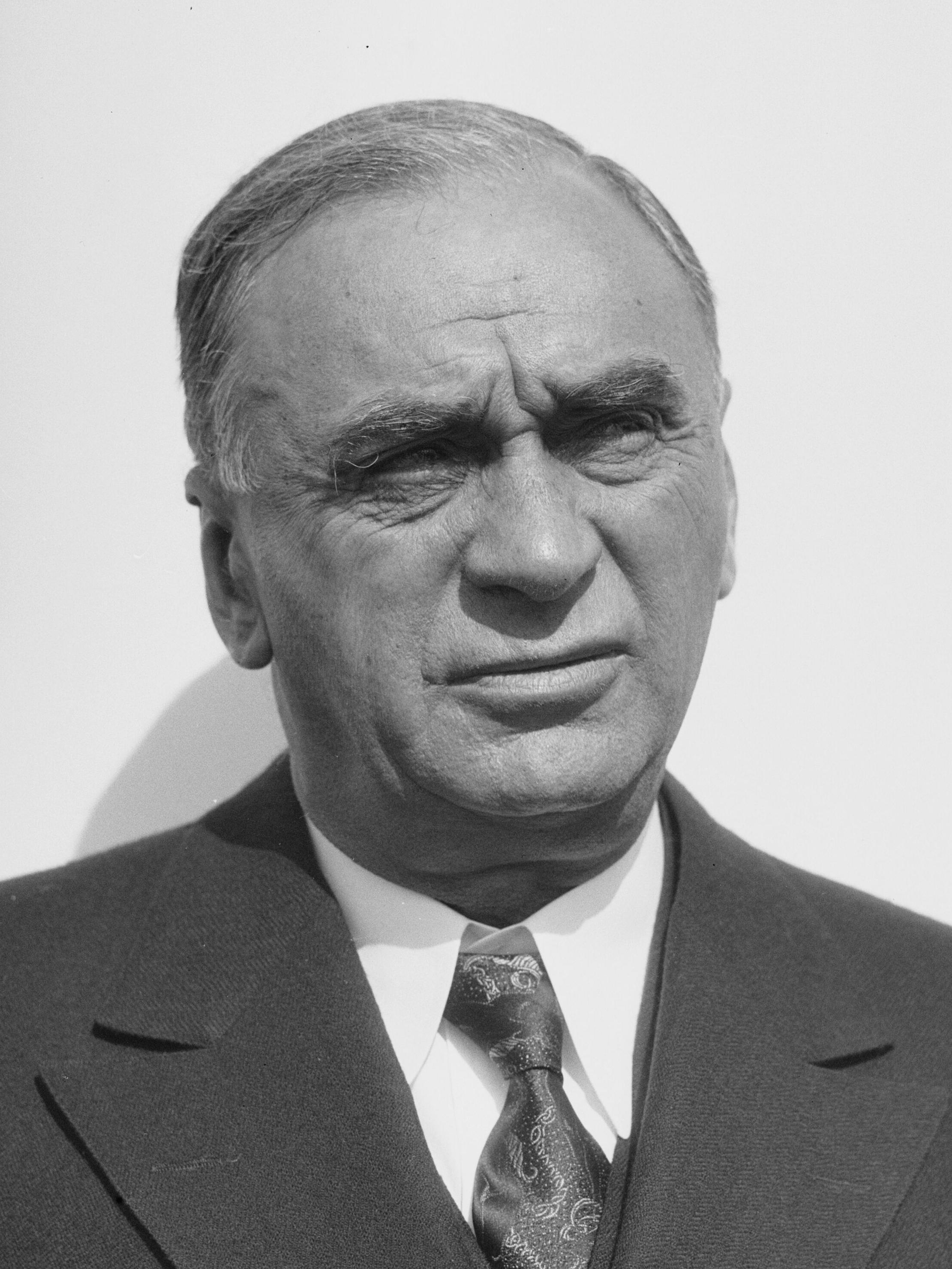
- Zemurray in 1934
- Born: Schmiel Zmurri; January 18, 1877; Kishinev, Bessarabia Governorate, Russian Empire
- Died: November 30, 1961 (aged 84); New Orleans, Louisiana, U.S.
- Burial place: Metairie Cemetery
- Occupation: Produce magnate
- Known for: Leading the United Fruit Company
- Spouse: Sarah Weinberger (m. 1908)
- Children: 2, including Doris

Samuel Zemurray (born Schmiel Zmurri; January 18, 1877 – November 30, 1961), nicknamed "Sam the Banana Man", was an American businessman who made his fortune in the banana trade. He founded the Cuyamel Fruit Company and later became president of the United Fruit Company, the world's most influential fruit company at the time. Both companies were powerful and had influential roles in the politics of Central American countries.

== Early life ==
Zemurray's birth name was Schmiel Zmurri (Yiddish: שמואל זמורי, Russian: Шмил Давидович Змура, Shmil Davidovich Zmura). He was born to a poor Jewish family in Kishinev, Bessarabia, Russian Empire (present-day Chişinău, Moldova). His grandfather, Mendel Hersh of Shargorod, was a Klezmer musician and bandleader. Zemurray grew up on a wheat farm. After his father died, he emigrated to America with his aunt in 1891 at age 14. After landing in New York, he settled in Selma, Alabama, where his uncle owned a general store. Zemurray worked many odd jobs during his youth, being a carpenter's assistant, delivery boy, traveling merchant, and housecleaner. Eventually, he saved enough money to bring his siblings from Europe to the United States.

== Career ==
=== Career beginnings ===
Zemurray encountered bananas for the first time in Selma in 1893. At the time, bananas were considered a new and exotic delicacy in the United States, and the industry was growing quickly. Zemurray went to the port of Mobile, Alabama, in 1895 to enter the banana trade. Because bananas ripen quickly, the banana trade relied on the ability to quickly bring the produce to market. In Mobile, Zemurray specialized in buying cheap bananas in danger of being overripe and quickly transporting and selling them in the surrounding region by rail. Starting with only $150, he had saved $100,000 by age 21. His success earned him the nickname "Sam the Banana Man".

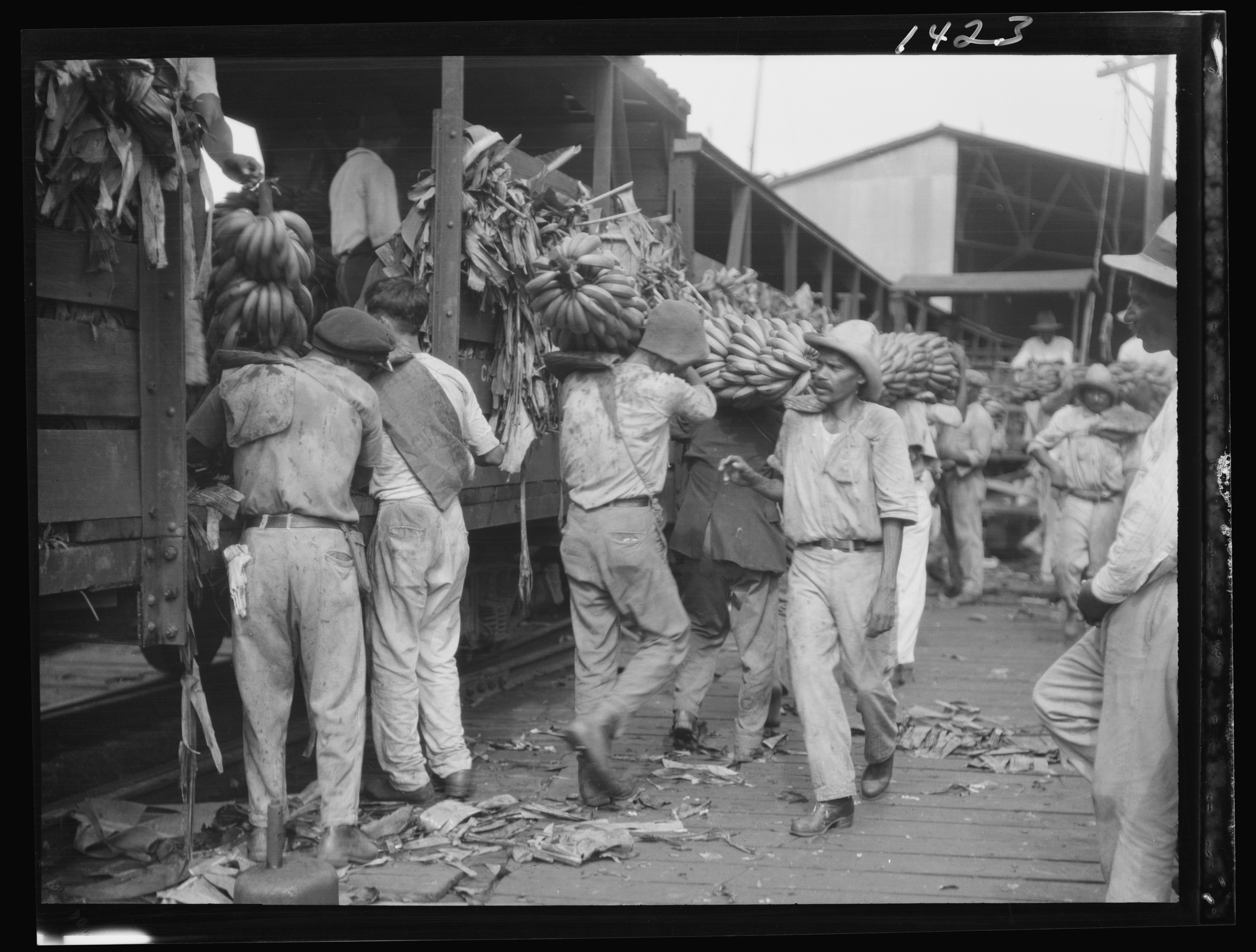
Workers unload bananas in New Orleans in the 1920s

In 1903, Zemurray signed a contract with United Fruit, the dominant company in the banana trade. Along with his partner, Ashbell Hubbard, the newly-formed Hubbard-Zemurray Company would buy and distribute United Fruit's ripest bananas. United Fruit itself bought a portion of Hubbard-Zemurray. In 1905, Zemurray moved to New Orleans and the company acquired Thatcher Brothers Steamship Company. They also acquired the Cuyamel Fruit Company and started using that name for the company. At this time, the company imported bananas from Central American farmers, but did not grow bananas of their own.

In 1910, Zemurray bought 5,000 acres (20 km^{2}) of land along the Cuyamel River in Honduras, near the town of Omoa. He then continued to borrow money and buy more lowland forest land in Honduras, well-suited for growing bananas. He developed this land by adding plantations, railroads, and bridges. The work was done largely by Jamaican workers, but Zemurray also liked to participate in the physical labor of the fields. At this point, Hubbard believed that Cuyamel Fruit Company's debts had grown too large, and Zemurray bought his share of the business.

=== Honduran coup ===
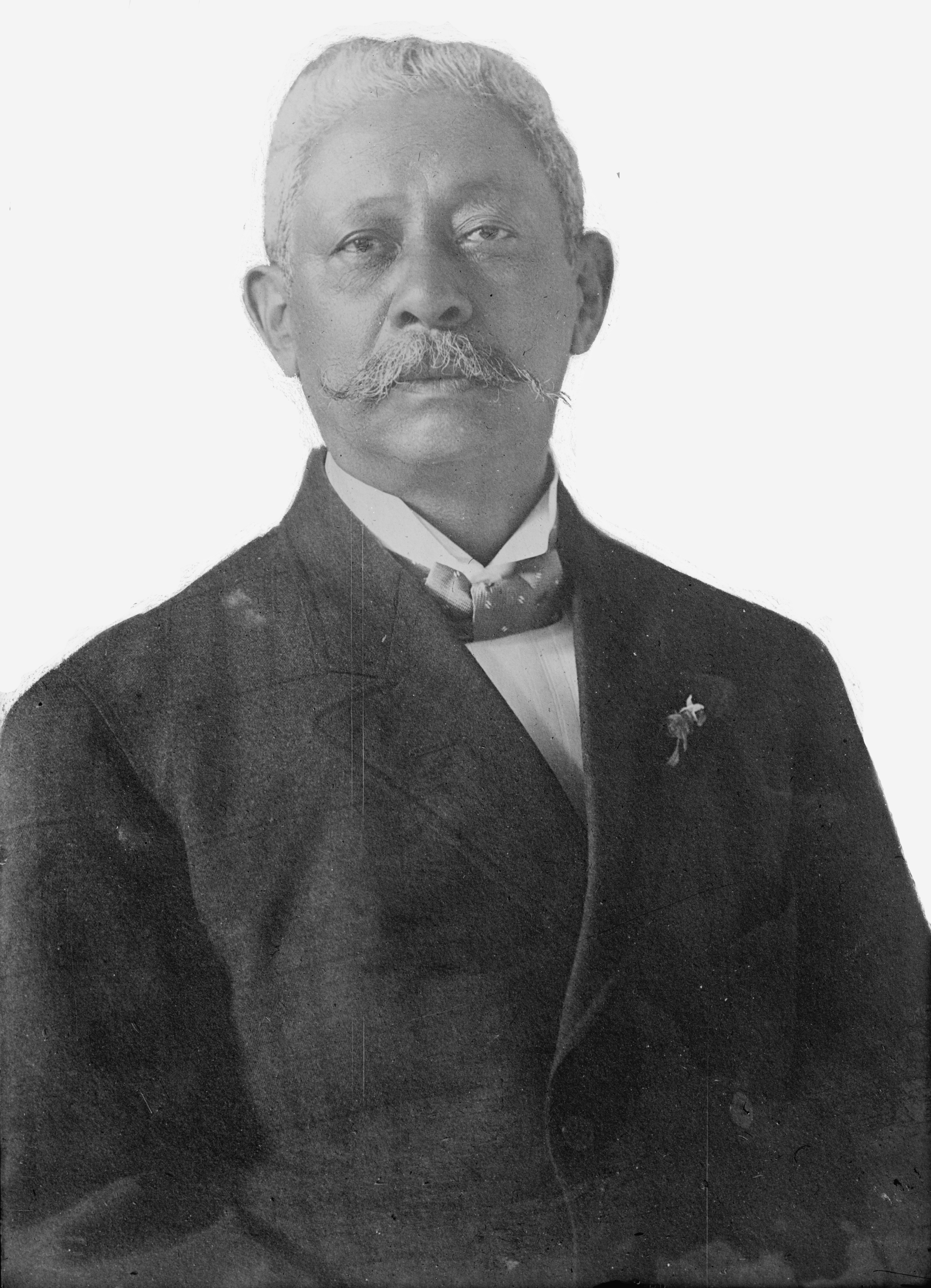
Zemurray's coup installed Manuel Bonilla as president of Honduras

Zemurray had increased the efficiency of his business through bribery and special deals with the Honduran government. But in 1910, the government of Honduras was working to reschedule their sovereign debt owed to the United Kingdom. United States Secretary of State Philander C. Knox facilitated the negotiations, which would place agents of bankers J.P. Morgan and Company in the country's customs offices to collect the taxes needed to repay the debt. Zemurray feared that the enforcement of these taxes would ruin his business, and he lobbied Knox to make the deal more favorable to him.

Knox made no concessions for Zemurray, and told him not to meddle in Honduran affairs. In spite of this instruction, Zemurray devised a plan to overthrow Honduran president Miguel Dávila in order to prevent the deal. He recruited mercenary Lee Christmas, who in turn recruited a force of about 100 other mercenaries in New Orleans, including famed Jewish soldier Sam Dreben. They sailed to Honduras in a former United States Navy vessel, the USS Hornet, where they began a war to install exiled Honduran former president Manuel Bonilla, who had been living in New Orleans. Gaining rebel soldiers from the local population, the coup was successful, and Bonilla was inaugurated on February 1, 1912. He then rewarded Zemurray with very favorable tax and land concessions for Cuyamel Fruit Company.

=== Sale of Cuyamel and first retirement ===
In 1913, Zemurray bought back the portion of his company owned by United Fruit, a transaction that was made possible by increasing anti-trust pressure on United Fruit from the United States government. Fully in control of the company, he expanded by buying 20 ships by 1915 that were outfitted with refrigerated holds. Cuyamel Fruit began to cultivate crops beyond bananas: coconuts, pineapples, palm oil, cattle, lumber, and sugarcane.

During the 1910s and 1920s, Zemurray continuously conflicted with United Fruit. Their competition over land in Central America included pranks, sabotage, legal challenges, and approached outright violence. In 1928, a Cuyamel Fruit boat was discovered with a cache of weapons aboard. In 1929, the United States Department of State facilitated discussions between Zemurray and United Fruit to merge their companies and end the conflict, which was endangering American interests abroad. A deal was completed in 1929, in which Zemurray sold Cuyamel to United Fruit for $31.5 million in stock, making him one of the richest people in the United States. Though Zemurray had prided himself on independence, he sold his company because of increasing pressure from the Department of State and because of the financial insecurity brought on by the Great Depression in 1929.

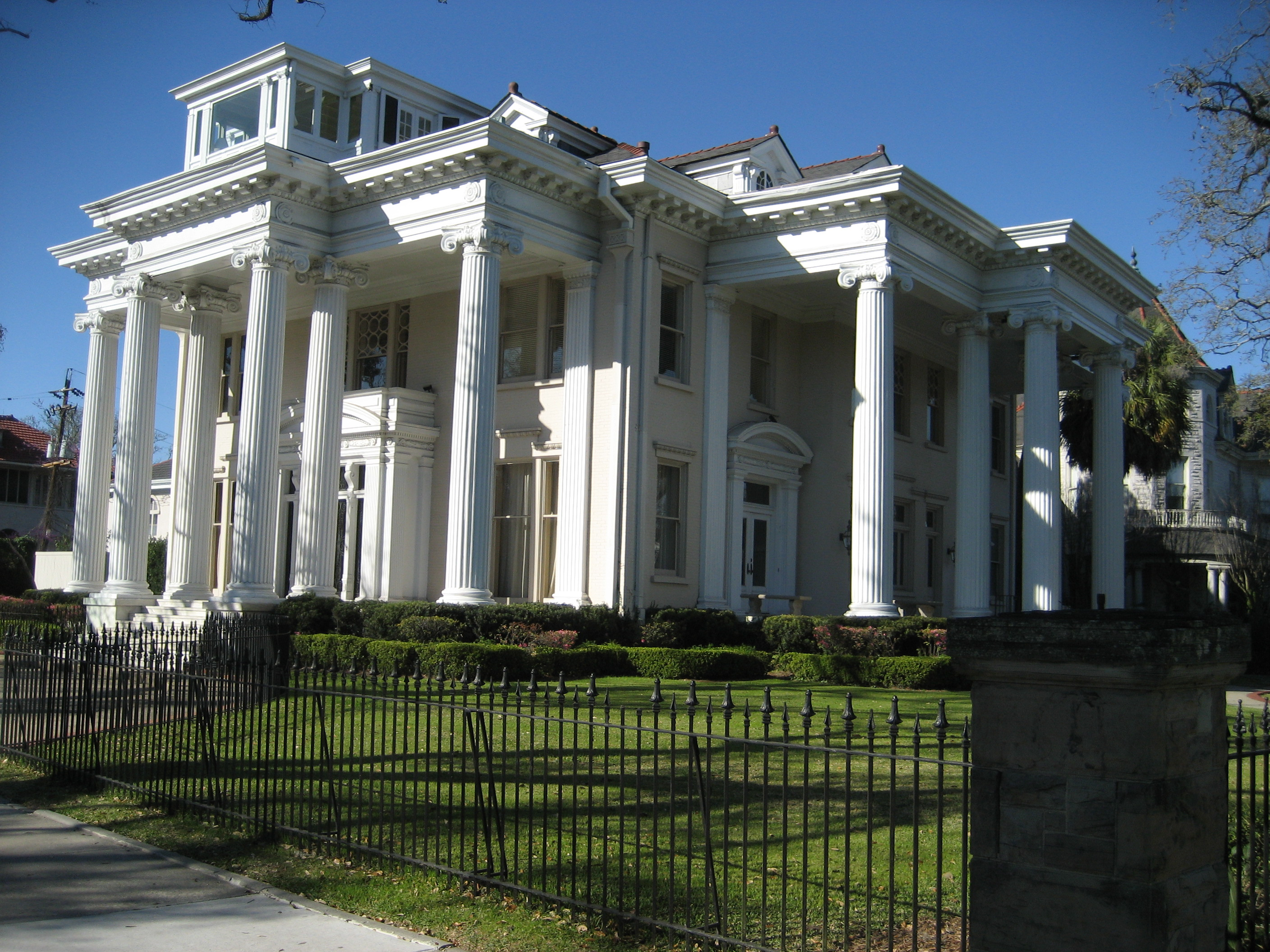
Formerly Zemurray's home, this mansion on St. Charles Avenue in New Orleans is now the residence for presidents of Tulane University

As part of the deal with United Fruit, Zemurray agreed to retire from the banana business entirely, to make sure he would not start a new fruit company and continue to compete with United Fruit. During this two year period, Zemurray remodeled his ornate Beaux Arts mansion in New Orleans at 2 Audubon Place. He also acquired in 1928 Houltonwood, a 25,000-acre plantation located near Hammond, Louisiana, which became a favorite retreat of Zemurray for the rest of his life. United Fruit suffered financially because of mismanagement and the Great Depression, so much so that its stock declined in value by 90% after it acquired Cuyamel. This encouraged Zemurray to return to the banana business by buying a controlling share of United Fruit and voting out the board of directors. Zemurray reorganized the company, decentralized decision-making and made the company profitable once more.

=== Leading United Fruit Company ===
After the sale of Cuyamel, United Fruit's business declined because of the impact of the Great Depression. In Zemurray's view, the company could be managed better to handle the economic downturn. Though he sent a letter and attended a board meeting, United Fruit's management was not interested in his ideas. Zemurray then visited individual United Fruit shareholders and collected their proxies, which would enable him to gain control of the company. He then attended a United Fruit board meeting, in which he produced the proxies, dramatically saying, "You've been fucking up this business long enough. I'm going to straighten it out."

Now as president of United Fruit Company, Zemurray succeeded in improving business. He considered his hands-on approach of visiting banana plantations to be the key to his success. He gained a detailed understanding of operations, resulting in mass terminations of weak employees, improved efficiency in the use of ships, and new financial approaches.

Partially as a result of banana diseases Sigatoka and Panama disease, Zemurray presided over very large acquisitions of land in Central America. Because the diseases were not curable, United Fruit would simply move to a new area of land after previous ones became infected. In this way, United Fruit came to own the majority of private land in countries like Honduras, even though much of it was left uncultivated.

=== Guatemalan coup ===
In 1953, the U.S. State Department and United Fruit embarked on a major public relations campaign to convince the American people and the rest of the U.S. government that Colonel Jacobo Arbenz intended to make Guatemala a Soviet "satellite". Zemurray authorized Edward Bernays to launch a propaganda campaign against Col. Arbenz's democratically elected government, which intended to expropriate some of the unused land owned by the United Fruit Co. and redistribute it to the local peasants. In 1954, the campaign succeeded and the U.S. Central Intelligence Agency helped orchestrate a coup that replaced Arbenz with a military junta led by Col. Carlos Castillo Armas.

Zemurray retired as president of United Fruit in late 1951.

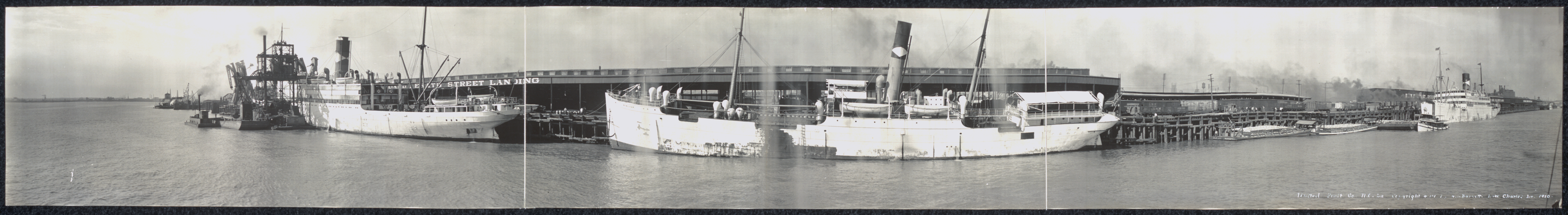
United Fruit ships in New Orleans, circa 1910

== Innovations ==
Zemurray and his company developed several innovations in banana farming, which contributed toward Cuyamel Fruit Company's increased efficiency over United Fruit.

- Selective pruning: removing the smallest and weakest banana plants.
- Drainage: adding spillways and canals to drain excess water away from plants.
- Silting: some fields were allowed to be flooded, which helped fertilize them with silt.
- Staking: banana plants were attached to a bamboo shoot, helping prevent them from blowing over in the wind.
- Overhead irrigation: sprinklers were added to banana fields so that plants received water year-round.

== Philanthropy ==
Zemurray, who accumulated a fortune of about $30 million, became a major philanthropist and gave to Tulane University, Radcliffe College, The Nation magazine, and to clinics and hospitals in New Orleans.

In 1924 he bought the Mesoamerican research library of the scholar William Gates and endowed a Department of Middle American Research at Tulane with $300,000, also paying for an expedition to Central America. In 1947, at the urging of his daughter, the archaeologist Doris Zemurray Stone, he gave Harvard University $250,000 to endow the Samuel Zemurray, Jr. and Doris Zemurray Stone Radcliffe Professorship, named also for his son, who was killed in the Second World War. The gift produced the first woman to hold a full professorship in Harvard's Faculty of Arts and Sciences. After his death, his family gave his New Orleans mansion at 2 Audubon Place to Tulane in 1965, and it became the university president's residence. He also founded the tuition-free Zamorano Pan-American Agricultural School in Honduras.

Zemurray supported the Zionist movement, which he came to through his acquaintance, beginning in 1922, with Chaim Weizmann. He was a director of the Palestine Economic Corporation, organized in 1925 under Bernard Flexner. In 1926 the corporation agreed to advance about $750,000 to Pinhas Rutenberg's Palestine Electric Corporation to help finish the hydroelectric power station on the Jordan River at Naharayim, along with transmission lines connecting Tel Aviv, Haifa, and Tiberias. According to his biographer Rich Cohen, Zemurray also gave $500,000 to the Jewish Agency in the 1920s, and in 1947 used his commercial influence among Latin American governments to help win votes for the United Nations partition of Palestine.

Zemurray supported President Franklin D. Roosevelt's New Deal policies, helping to draft the Agricultural Adjustment Administration industry codes, and contributed financially to left-wing causes such as The Nation.

== Personal life ==
Zemurray married Sarah Weinberger in May 1908. Weinberger was the daughter of Jake Weinberger, an early figure in the banana trade and employee of Zemurray's. Weinberger published a cookbook titled One Hundred Unusual Dinners and How to Prepare Them. Their daughter, archaeologist Doris Zemurray Stone, was born in 1909. Their son, Samuel Jr., was born in 1913; a World War II pilot, the younger Zemurray was killed in action in 1943 when his plane crashed in an Algerian desert, leaving behind a widow and two children. In 1945, Zemurray and Coryell McKinney donated 25 acres (10 ha) of land in Hammond, Louisiana, for a memorial park to honor Samuel Jr. and his flight crew. The site is now part of the city's Zemurray Park.

Zemurray was a member of Temple Sinai in New Orleans.

== See also ==
- James Dole, pineapple businessman
- Zemurray Gardens Lodge Complex
- Banana republic

== Bibliography ==
- Noam N. Tepper. The secret tour of Reuven Zaslani - The 1st head of the Mossad. Tel Aviv, TA: Ahi-Assaf-BP, 2024.
- Peter Chapman. Bananas: How the United Fruit Company Shaped the World. New York, NY: Canongate, 2008.
- The Associated Press. "Samuel Zemurray, 84, Is Dead; Headed United Fruit Company". The New York Times, December 2, 1961.
- Thomas P. McCann. On the Inside. Beverly, Massachusetts: Quinlan Press, 1987.
- Chaim Weizmann (1949). Trial and Error: The Autobiography of Chaim Weizmann. Jewish Publication Society of America.
- Maggie Heyn Richardson, "Banana Man", Imagine Louisiana magazine, Summer 2007.
- Stephen Kinzer. Overthrow. New York, NY: Times Books, 2006.
- Rich Cohen. The Fish That Ate the Whale. New York, NY: Farrar Straus Giroux, 2012.
- Dan Koeppel. Banana: The Fate of the Fruit That Changed the World, Hudson Street Press.
