= Lee Christmas =

American mercenary (1863–1924)

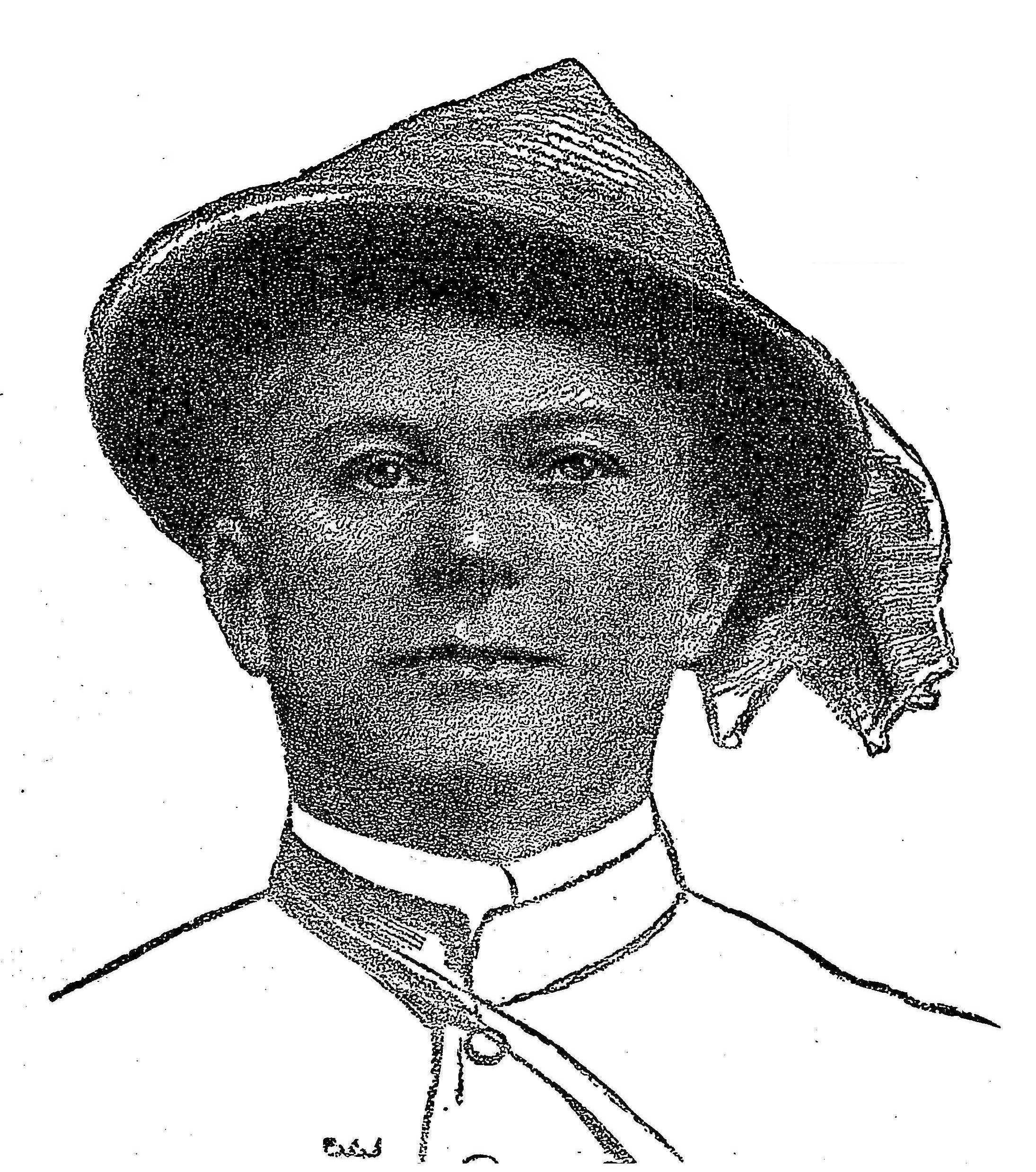
- Born: Leon Winfield Christmas; February 2, 1863; Livingston Parish, Louisiana, C.S
- Died: January 21, 1924 (aged 60); New Orleans, Louisiana, U.S
- Occupation: Mercenary
- Known for: Battle of La Ceiba
- Spouse: Ida Culotta (m. 1914)

Leon Winfield Christmas, usually called Lee Christmas (February 2, 1863 – January 21, 1924) was an American mercenary in Central America.

== Early life and career ==
Lee Christmas was born on February 2, 1863, on a plantation on the Amite River in Livingston Parish, Louisiana. As a young man, he worked as a pilot on tugboats on Lake Pontchartrain and later became a railroad brakeman living in McComb, Mississippi, for the Illinois Central System in 1879. He helped to build the Louisville, New Orleans and Texas Railroad, and returned to passenger service as a baggage master before the line was completed. He then became a fireman and was promoted to engineer by age 22.

Christmas ran locomotives between Memphis and New Orleans until 1897, when he fell asleep at the controls after 54 hours on duty and caused a collision with an oncoming train. He was fired by Illinois Central and found odd jobs for the next three years, until he demanded an investigation of his collision. Because he had been on duty for 54 hours, he was exonerated, but then was unable to be re-hired as an engineer because he could not pass a new test for color-blindness.

== Central America ==
In November 1894, Christmas moved to Puerto Cortes, Honduras. Again employed as a railroad engineer, his train was captured by rebels at Laguna Trestle on April 14, 1897, and Christmas joined their cause. He exhibited dashing bravery in his first battle on that day, and was congratulated by the revolution's leader, Manuel Bonilla. He earned the nickname "the Incredible Yanqui", and Bonilla immediately made him an officer.

Christmas defected to the government forces in 1899 and was appointed a colonel and chief of police of Tegucigalpa by President Terencio Sierra, in May 1902. Defecting again in 1903, Christmas accepted a position as aide to rebel Bonilla. When Bonilla became president of Honduras, he appointed Christmas a general. Perhaps to assert his toughness or to intimidate the natives, Christmas had been known to chew on glass.

Bonilla's abortive invasion of Nicaragua in 1907 led to his overthrow by General Miguel Dávila. Christmas was wounded in the fighting and exiled to Guatemala.

=== Battle of La Ceiba ===
In 1910, banana magnate Samuel Zemurray of Cuyamel Fruit Company desired to change regimes in Honduras, because Dávila's government was planning financial deals that would increase Zemurray's business costs. Zemurray hired Christmas to organize a military coup that would install Bonilla back in power, against the wishes of the United States government. Christmas hired about 100 mercenaries in New Orleans, including famed Jewish soldier Sam Dreben. Zemurray supplied the weapons and transportation. Their first attempt at revolution in 1910 was a failure.

The group attempted revolution a second time the following year, with a reorganized force using US Army surplus Colt Model 1895 machine guns and transported on a former United States Navy vessel. Gaining soldiers from the local population, Bonilla's rebels captured Trujillo and Iriona, and cemented their victory at the Battle of La Ceiba on January 25, 1911. Christmas used his machine guns for fire support of the infantry with interlocking fields of fire, inflicting some six hundred casualties on the government forces.

This is believed to be the first time automatic weapons were so used, and La Ceiba was studied by military professionals in Europe and the Americas. This tactical use of machine guns would become standard practice in the First World War. Bonilla resumed the presidency of Honduras, with Christmas as his military commander.

== Later career ==
After Bonilla's death in 1913, Christmas lost his influence and worked odd jobs. He attempted to volunteer for World War I, but was rejected because he was over 50 years old. He eventually acquired patents as an inventor, developing a rattrap that needed no bait, and a railroad safety device to prevent accidents when engineers fell asleep.

Christmas lived in New Orleans, Guatemala, and Nicaragua, attempting various investments and business schemas.

While in Central America, Christmas began to suffer from tropical sprue, and returned to the United States in hopes of receiving treatment. He died in New Orleans some months later, on January 21, 1924, aged 60, of acute anemia brought about by the disease.

Christmas was widely written about in his lifetime, and is believed to be the inspiration for Richard Harding Davis' novels Captain Macklin and Soldiers of Fortune.

The University of Tennessee has papers donated by Mrs. Marion Samson of Abilene, Texas in 1958. They include correspondence to and from Christmas, and an invitation to his wedding to Ida Culotta at Puerto Cortés, Honduras, in 1914.
