= Hospital Vicente D'Antoni =

Geography
- Location: Avenida Morazan, La Ceiba, Honduras
- Coordinates: 15.774764°N 86.789621°W

History
- Opened: February 4, 1924

Links
- Website: www.hospitalvicentedantoni.com
- Lists: Hospitals in Honduras

Hospital Vicente D'Antoni is a hospital in La Ceiba, Honduras established on February 4, 1924 in a formal ceremony conducted by the nation's President. It is one of the best hospitals in the republic and was greatly assisted for a number of years by the arrival of two nurses from New England from Sisters of Mercy, who opened up a nursing school at the hospital.

== History ==
Hospital Vincente D'Antoni was built on February 4, 1924 named in memory after Sr. Vincent D'Antoni, a general manager of the Vaccaro Bros. Co., which provided funds for its construction that totaled $200,000. It was originally built to treat charity patients.
