= Standard Fruit Company =

American fruit company

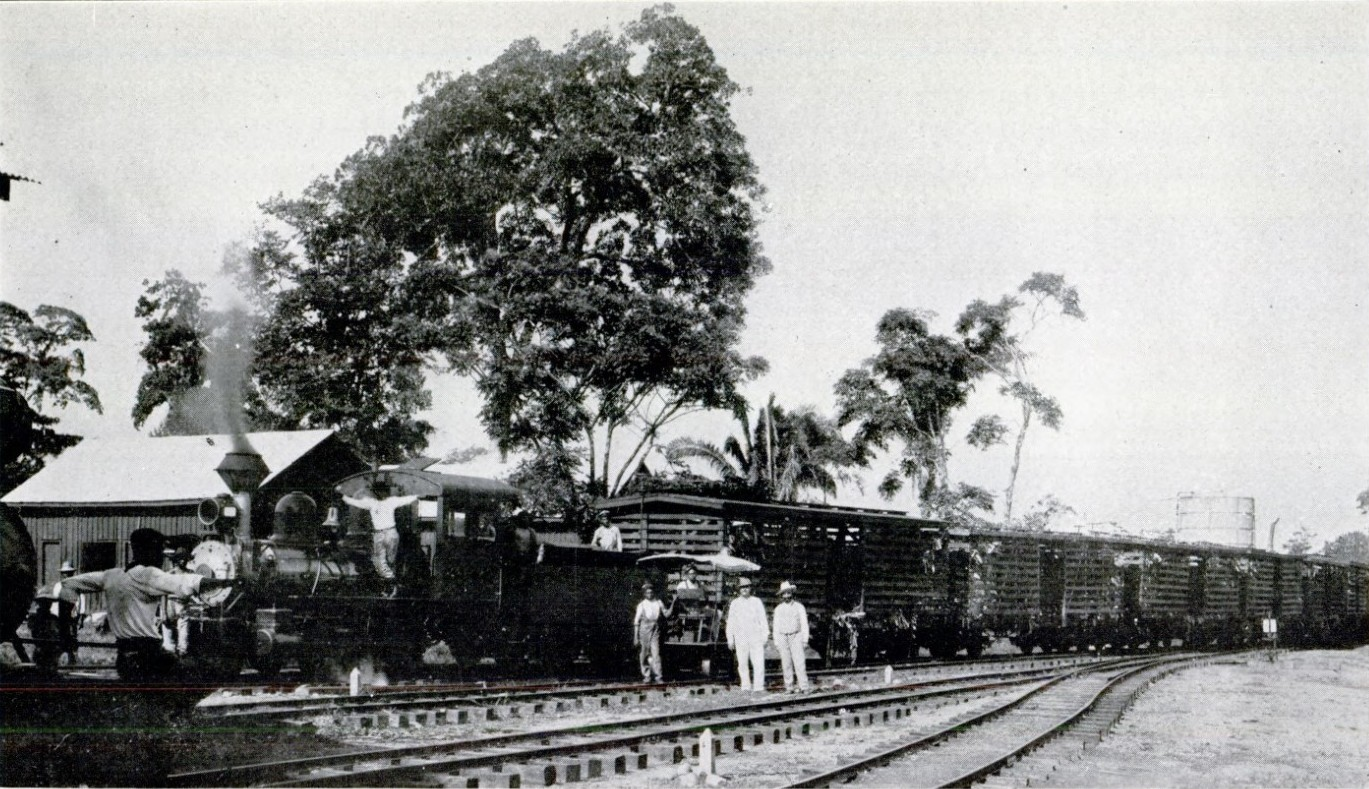
- Industry: Fruit
- Founded: 1924; 102 years ago, in the United States
- Founder: Vaccaro brothers
- Defunct: 1991
- Fate: Acquired by Castle & Cooke in 1968
- Successor: Dole Food Company

The Standard Fruit Company (now Dole plc) was established in the United States in 1924 by the Vaccaro brothers. Its forerunner was started in 1899, when Sicilian Arberesh immigrants Joseph, Luca and Felix Vaccaro, together with Salvador D'Antoni, began importing bananas to New Orleans from La Ceiba, Honduras. By 1915, the business had grown so large that it bought most of the ice factories in New Orleans in order to refrigerate its banana ships, leading to its president, Joseph Vaccaro, becoming known as the "Ice King".

Along with the United Fruit Company, Standard Fruit played a significant role in the governments of Honduras and other Central American countries, which became known as "banana republics" due to the high degree of control which the fruit companies held over the nations.

In 1926, the company changed its name from Standard Fruit Company to Standard Fruit & Steamship Company. Between 1964 and 1968, the company was acquired by the Castle & Cooke Corporation, which also acquired James Dole's Hawaiian Pineapple Company (HAPCO) around the same time. In 1991, Castle & Cooke was renamed Dole Food Company. Castle & Cooke Inc, a real estate company, was spun off in 1995 and, following a 2000 management buyout, is now privately held.

== 1954 Honduras strike ==
In 1954, there was a general strike in Honduras against the Standard Fruit company among others. A detailed timeline can be seen below:

HONDURAS:

May 5. The workers of the United Fruit Company go on strike demanding higher wages and are followed by the Standard Fruit workers. This strike paralyzes all banana operations and peaks with 25,000 striking workers (around 15% of all the country's labor force)

May 7: United Fruit manager J. F. Aycock declares that the company would not negotiate as long as the workers are on strike. That day, the strike expands to La Ceiba, Standard Fruit center of operations. Contrary to United Fruit, Standard offers to negotiate with striking workers.

May 9. The American ambassador in Honduras says that the country's strike had been inspired by Guatemalan communists. In addition, U.S. Secretary of State John Foster Dulles suggests that Guatemala Arbenz's government might be behind the Honduran strike.

By the second week of May 11,000 Standard Fruit Company employees join the strike. Simultaneously, laborers in others sector of the economy go on strike too, including miners, brewers, and textile workers.

May 16: The strikers present their "pliego de peticiones" to manager Aycock in La Lima. They quote the Universal Declarations of the Rights of Man and demand an increase in wages. At the same time, the workers of Coca-Cola in La Ceiba and Puerto Cortes strike.

Shortly after the protests began, the Honduran President Manuel Galvez expels two Guatemalan consuls charging them of instigation.

May 18: Standard Fruit opens negotiations with the workers under governmental arbitration. The company agrees to increase wages and improve working conditions, making this the first time in Honduran history that a private corporation negotiates a collective agreement. The workers committed themselves to go back to work on May 21.

May 21: After the Standard Fruit workers go back to work, the United Fruit workers harden their position. The number of strikers increased to 100,000 persons.
