= Presidential Palace of Honduras =

The Presidential Palace of Honduras is the official residence of the president of the Republic of Honduras. Currently the president resides in the Palacio José Cecilio del Valle.

== History ==
=== 19th century ===
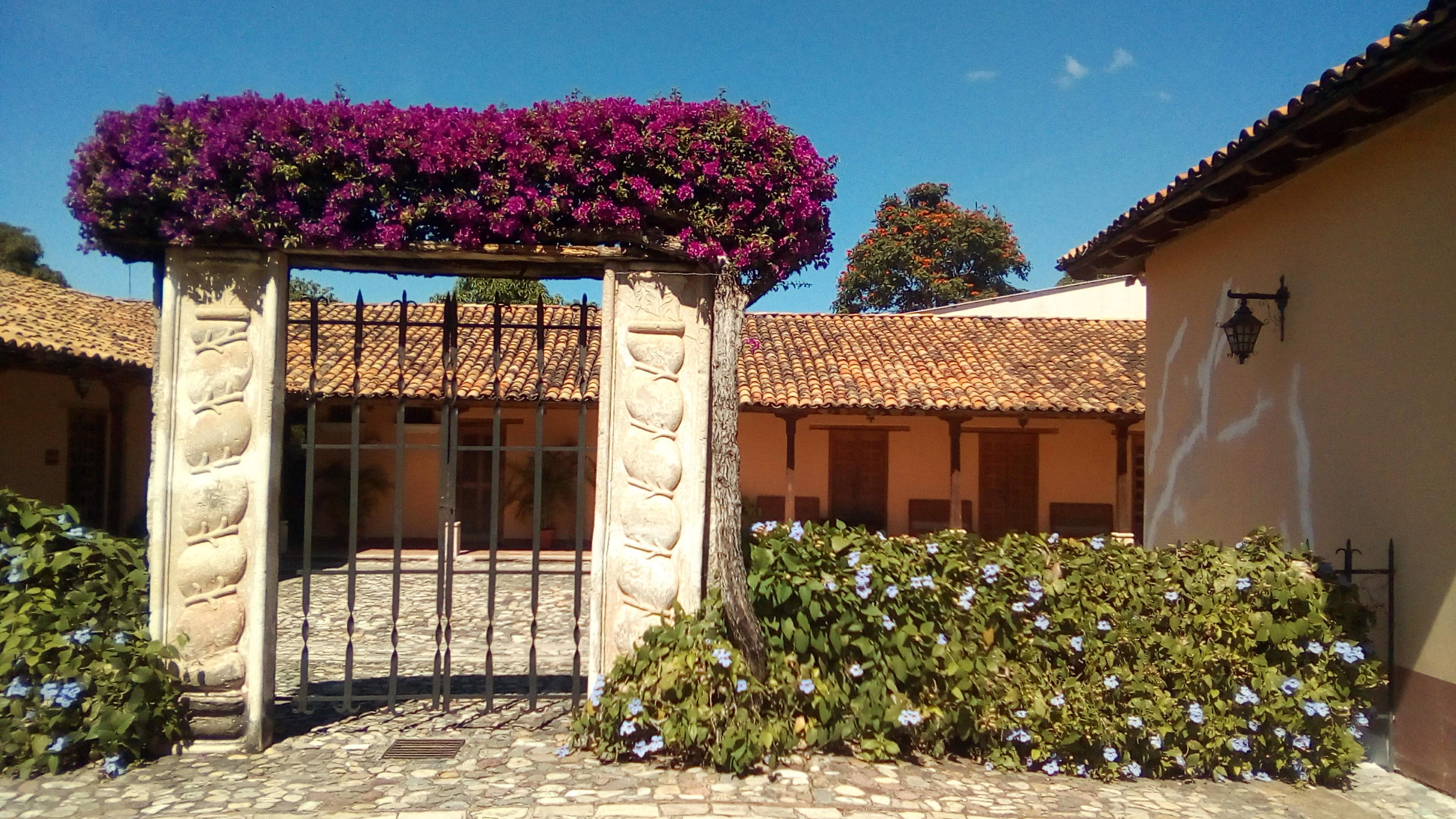
What today functions as the anthropology museum of Comayagua served as the presidential house of Honduras in the 19th century.

In 1821 the 'City Council of Comayagua' was the first official residence of the Honduran head of state. The location of the capital remained there for almost 60 years, until being moved to Tegucigalpa, via Decree No. 11 on October 30, 1880. Doctor Marco Aurelio Soto, the “Reformer of the Republic”, also relocated the judicial and legislative headquarters, the federal reserve, and the state university to Tegucigalpa.

The first presidential house in the city of Tegucigalpa was a two-story wooden building built by Juan Judas Salavarría, located on the south west side of Plaza de la Merced. Today it is the ground floor of the current Legislative Palace. The executive offices were housed on the second floor, where there were the offices of Mr. President Dr. Soto and the government Secretary General Dr. Ramón Rosa .

In 1883 the president of Honduras, the General Luis Bográn, decided that the busy house by the Plaza de la Merced was not suitable enough, and moved the offices to another building, which was to the right of the session hall of the National Congress. This building had stone foundations, walls made out of adobe, and wide living rooms for the governmental administration, decorated with the national banner, pavilion, shields, and paintings of the national heroes. It also had a part allocated for the guard or presidential escort, which would later become the School of Capes and Sergeants.

The following Honduran presidents lived in this house: General Luis Bográn Barahona, General Ponciano Leiva Madrid, General Domingo Vásquez Toruño, Doctor Policarpo Bonilla Vásquez, Engineer Terencio Sierra Romero, General Manuel Bonilla Chirinos, Doctor Miguel Rafael Dávila Cuéllar and Doctor Francisco Bertrand Barahona. Doctor Francisco Bertrand Barahona would again move the governmental headquarters to a new building where today one finds the Central Bank of Honduras, and where there used to be the national post office.

=== 20th century ===
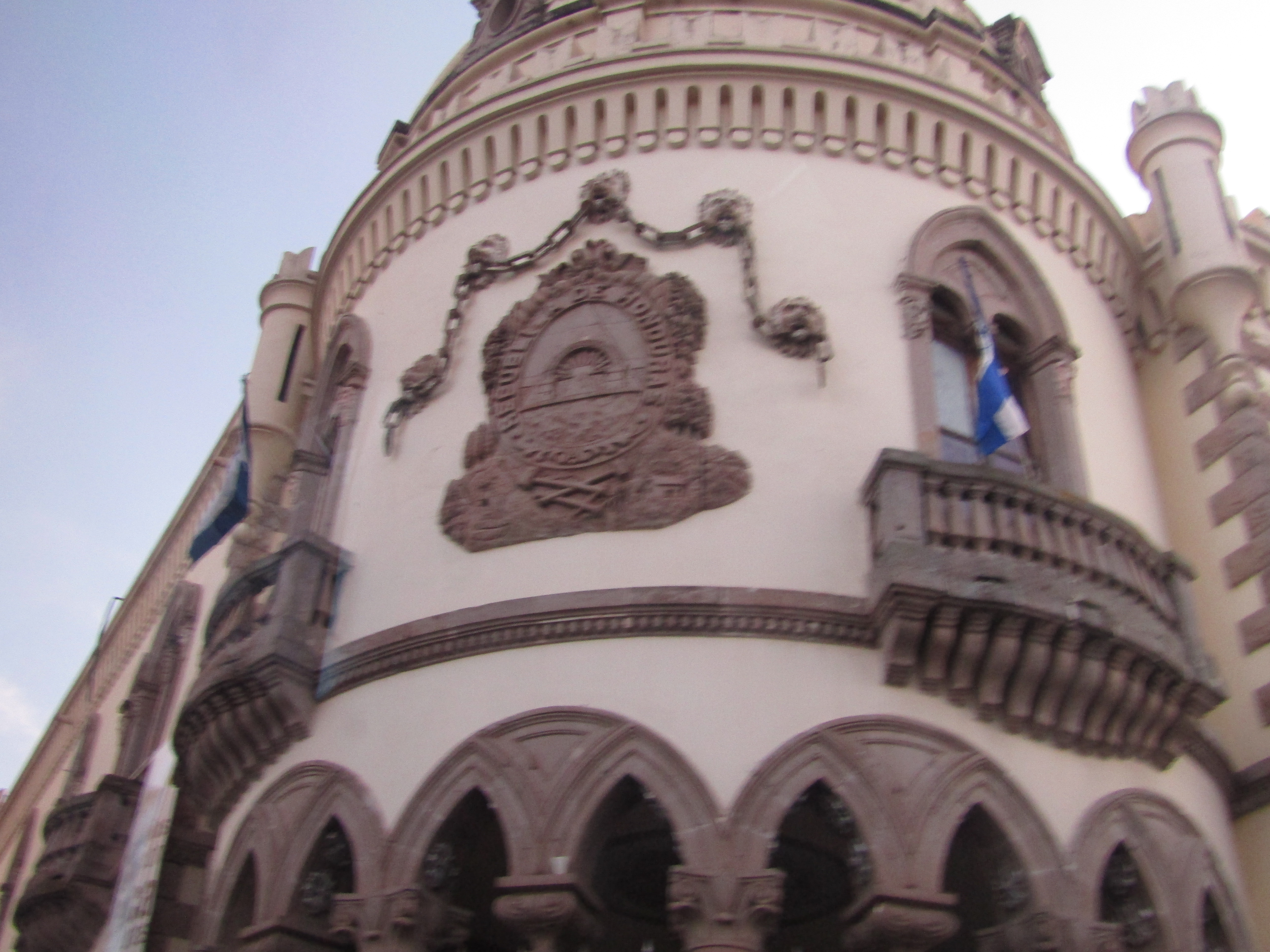
Facade of the Old Presidential Palace of Honduras

In 1914 Honduras undertook development for a new seat of government. The Barahona administration purchased a parcel of land from Jerónimo Zelaya for 40,000 Honduran pesos. The Italian architect Augusto Bressani designed this new presidential mansion. It was a two-story stone building with a classical Victorian façade, watchtowers, a presidential office, and a dome atop which flew the national flag. It also had apartments, offices on the ground floor called “blue living rooms” for receptions, a meeting room known as the “hall of mirrors”, a patio and cubicles for the presidential guard, ceilings with wood and clay tiling plastered and decorated with glass shard lamps, corridors lined with statues brought from Italy, and floors paved with mosaics and ceramics made in the workshops of Bellucci in Italy. Construction finished on the new presidential house in 1919 under the presidency of the General Rafael López Gutiérrez who was the first person to live in the new house. The following Honduran leaders lived in this house: General Vicente Tosta Carrasco, Doctor Miguel Paz Barahona, Doctor Vicente Mejía Colindres, Doctor and General Tiburcio Carias Andino, Doctor Juan Manuel Gálvez Durón, Accountant Julio Lozano Díaz, the Military Triumvirate of 1956–1959, Doctor José Ramón Adolfo Villeda Morales, General Oswaldo Enrique López Arellano, Lawyer Ramón Ernesto Cruz Uclés, General Juan Alberto Melgar Castro, General Policarpo Juan Paz García, Doctor Roberto Suazo Córdova, Engineer José Simón Azcona of the Hoyo. After 72 years of leaders living in this presidential house, and after the first two years of the administration of the Graduate Rafael Leonardo Callejas Romero, the presidential headquarters were moved to a modern building in the Governmental Civic Center on Miraflores Boulevard, next to the Palace of Justice. Callejas would order the restoration of the former presidential mansion, which would be urgent and costly, as the building had been given to the National Archive of Honduras (NAH) and a national museum, and the former presidential mansion had been elevated to the status of National Historical Heritage.

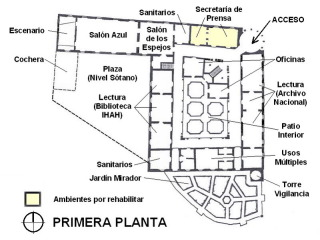
Flat of the Old presidential palace of Honduras.

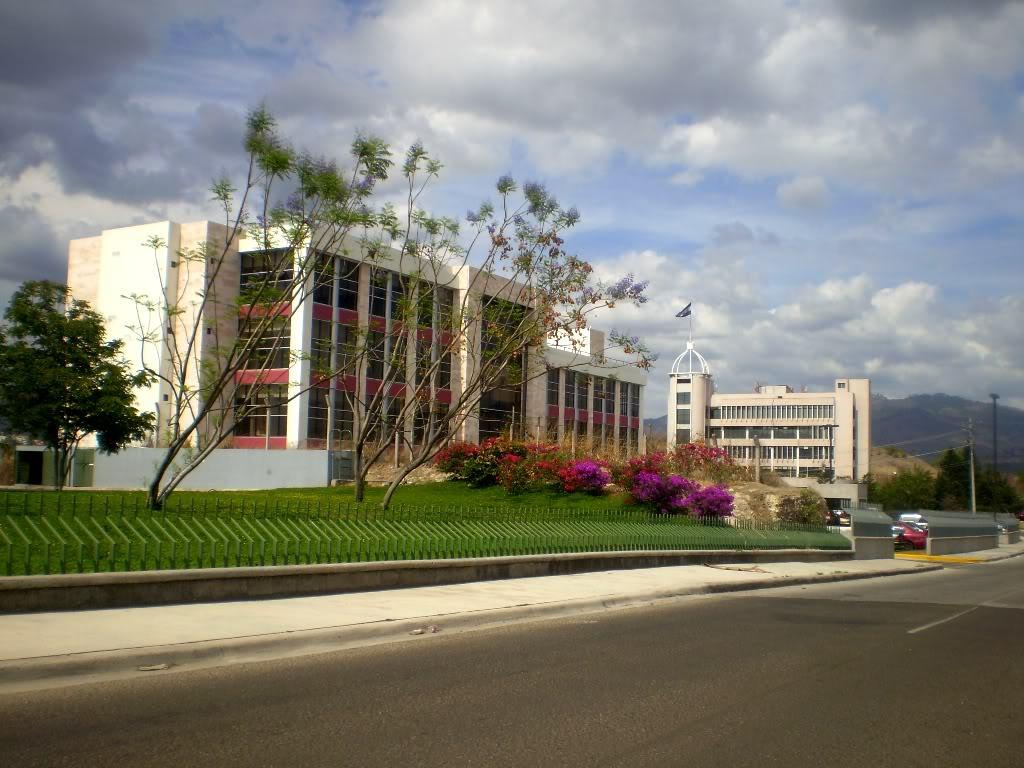
At the end the ex Presidential House of Honduras that occupy the president Rafael Leonardo Callejas Romero, situated in The Governmental Civic Centre, Tegucigalpa, M.D.C.

In the following two years of his government, the president Rafael Leonardo Callejas Romero would work in a six-story building where there were also the offices of the executive, presidential appointees, presidential advisers, the paymaster, information and governmental press, the secretariat hall events, the chamber of ministers and other units. While still bigger than the former presidential mansion, even this new building didn't fulfill the needs of the executive branch. In the new building Callejas received his successor, Doctor Carlos Roberto Reina Idiáquez, in 1994.

== Current presidential residence ==
In 1998, the new constitutional president Engineer Carlos Roberto Flores Facussé was not satisfied with the building chosen by the ex president Rafael Leonardo Callejas Romero and decided to move the executive headquarters to a new building that was allocated for the Ministry of External Relations. The Palace José Cecilio del Valle, originally built in 1988, designed by the architect Jorge Luciano Durón Bustillo, was chosen as the new executive headquarters. Since then, the following Honduran leaders have lived in this building: Carlos Roberto Flores Facussé, Graduate Ricardo Rodolfo Maduro Joest, gentleman José Manuel Zelaya Rosales, the provisional government of the gentleman Roberto Michelleti Bain, the Graduate Porfirio Lobo Sosa, Lawyer Juan Orlando Hernández Alvarado, and the current leader of Honduras, Nasry Asfura.

== Other presidential houses ==
- Between 1852 and 1853 under the presidency of the General José Trinidad Cabins the city of Santa Rosa of Copán becomes the provisional capital of Honduras, and the building of the “National House” turns into presidential house. Later, in 1862 during the provisional presidency of entrepreneur Victoriano Castellanos Cortes, he chose two houses he owned and made them the headquarters of the Executive and Legislative branches. It was also the temporary capital in 1863 to repel the attack of the Guatemalan General José Rafael Career Turcios.
- Between 1875 and 1876 in the city of Gracias, Lempira, the General José María Medina occupied a house of adobe with a wooden coffer ceiling and tile clay as its seat of government.

== See also ==
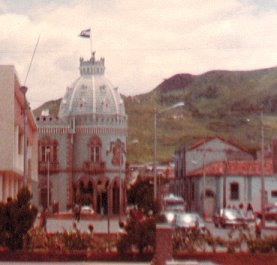
The old Presidential Palace during the 80s.

- National historical monuments of Honduras
- Executive branch of the government of Honduras
- President of Honduras
- First Lady of Honduras

== Bibliography ==
- Aguilar, Juan Manuel. "Brief Historical Review of the House of Government of Honduras" Tegucigalpa, Honduras.
