= History of Honduras (1838–1932) =

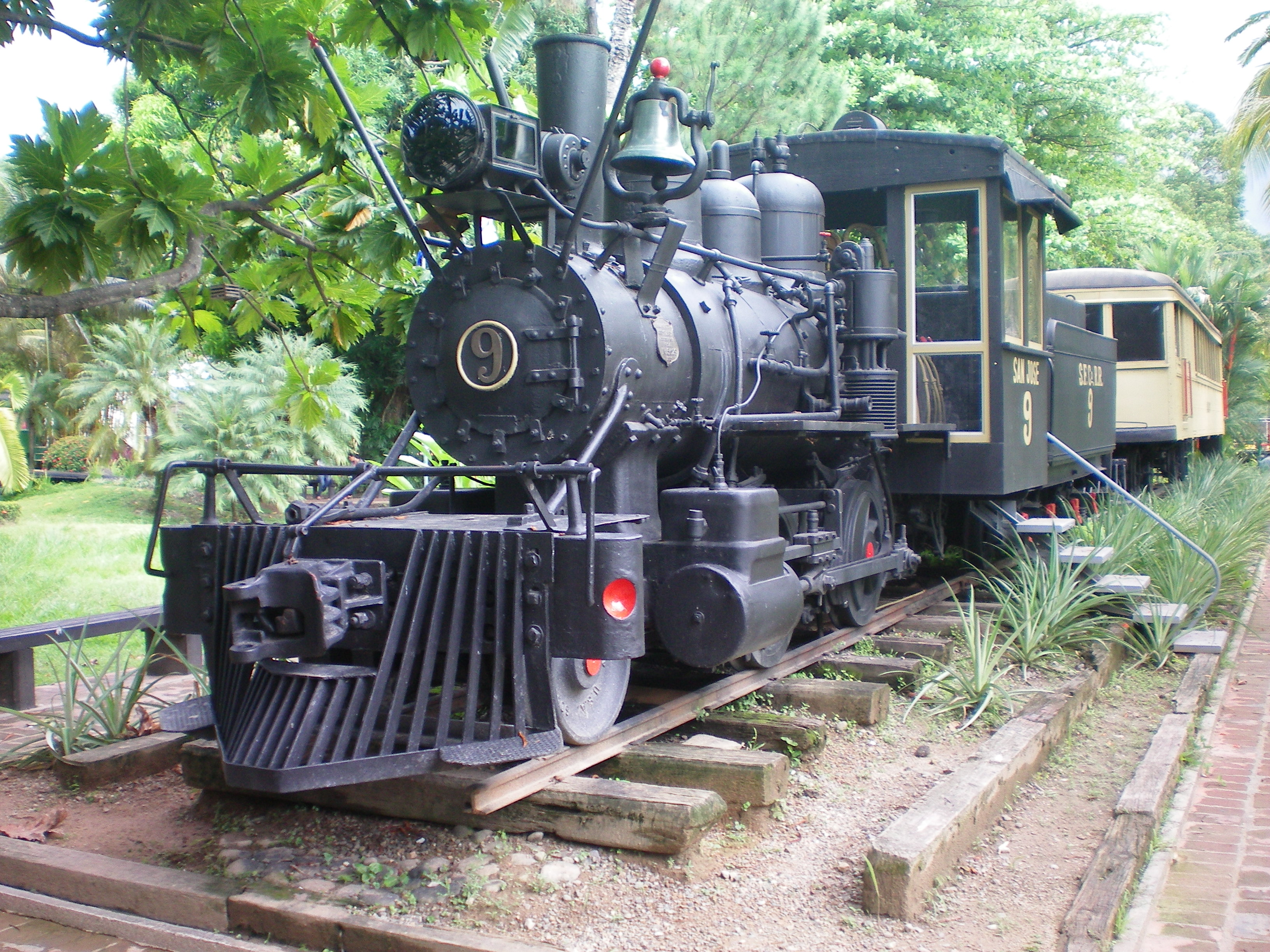
The National Railway of Honduras was an important part in the development of Honduras at the beginning of the 20th century

Honduras is a republic in Central America, at times referred to as Spanish Honduras to differentiate it from British Honduras, which became the modern-day state of Belize.

Honduras was home to several important indigenous cultures, most notably the Maya. Much of the country was conquered by Spain who introduced its now predominant language and many of its customs in the sixteenth century. It became independent in 1821 and has been a republic since the end of Spanish rule.

During the first half of the 20th century, the economy of Honduras was dominated by American companies such as the United Fruit Company, the Standard Fruit Company, and the Cuyamel Fruit Company, which established enormous banana plantations along the north coast. These companies quickly made bananas the primary export of the country in return for large land grants from conservative politicians. Foreign capital, life in the banana plantations, and conservatives determined the politics of Honduras from the mid-20th century to 1988.

Manuel Bonilla came to the presidency of Honduras through a military operation. Once in power, he became an even better friend of the banana companies than his predecessor, Terencio Sierra. He gave the banana companies tax breaks and permission to build a variety of infrastructure, including the National Railway of Honduras. One of Bonilla's greater accomplishments was the delimitation of the border with Nicaragua, especially in the area of the Mosquito Coast where there had been a long dispute after the Treaty of Comayagua and Managua with Great Britain.

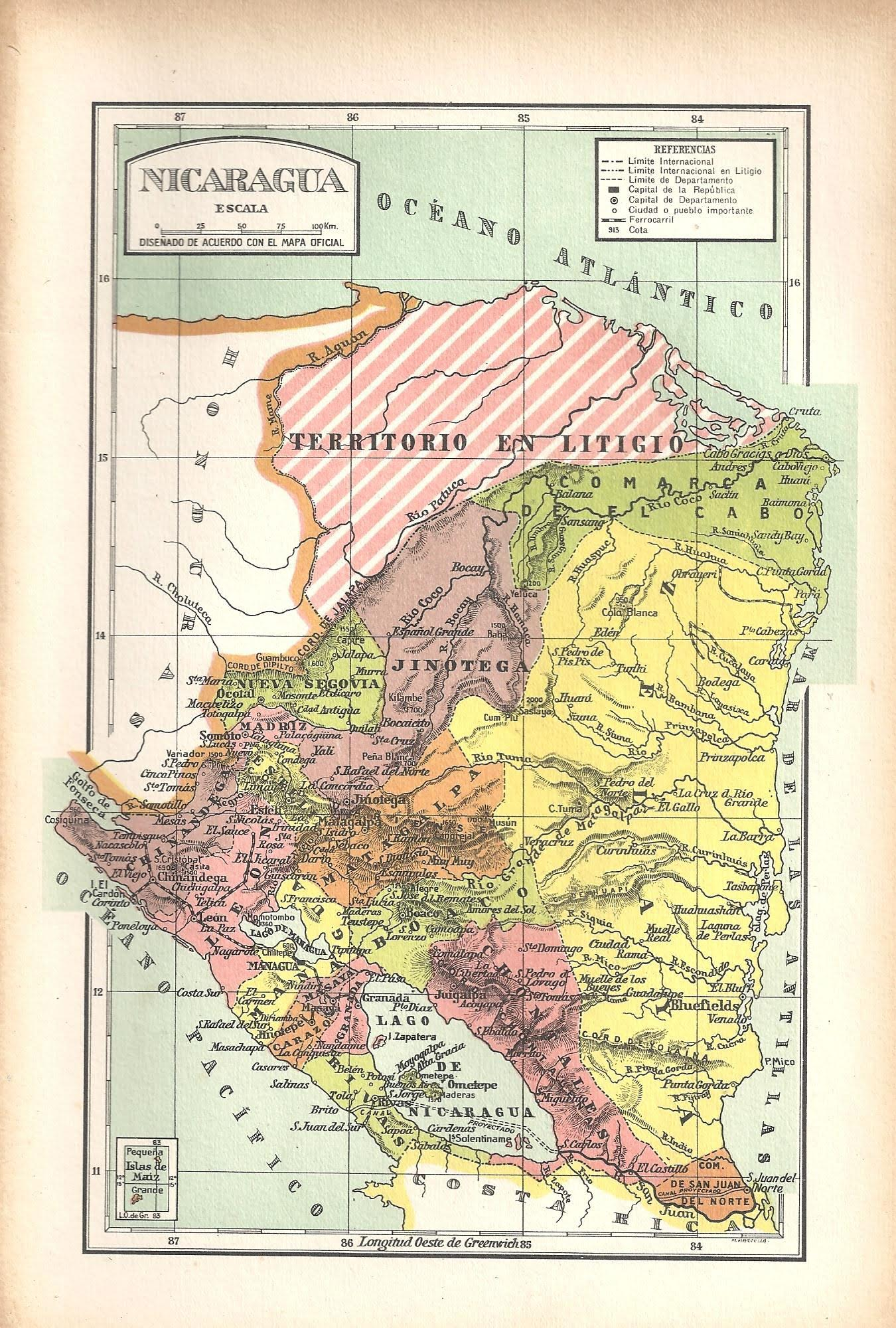
Territory that was disputed between Honduras and Nicaragua.

Miguel R. Dávila succeeded Bonilla as president. During his administration, the United States tried to put an end to Central American conflicts through the Central American Peace Conference of 1907. However, from 1920 to 1923, there were seventeen uprisings or attempted coups d'état in Honduras. This contributed even more to the political instability of the country.

Vicente Mejía Colindres assumed power in 1929 with big hopes for his administration and his nation. Honduras seemed to direct its course toward political and economic progress. But many of Mejía Colindres's hopes were dispelled with the start of the Great Depression.

== Development of an independent nation (1838–99) ==
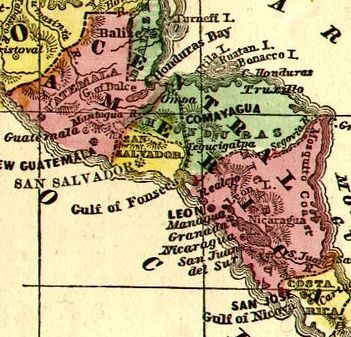
Detail of an 1860 map of Central America.

For Honduras, the period of federation had been disastrous. Local rivalries and ideological disputes had produced political chaos and disrupted the economy. The British had taken advantage of the chaotic condition to reestablish their control over the Islas de la Bahía. As a result, Honduras wasted little time in formally seceding from the federation once it was free to do so. Independence was declared on November 15, 1838, and in January 1839, an independent constitution was formally adopted.

Francisco Morazán then ruled only El Salvador, and in 1839 his forces there were attacked by a Honduran army commanded by General Francisco Ferrera. Ferrera was defeated but returned to attack again in the summer, only to suffer another defeat. The following year, Morazán himself was overthrown, and two years later he was shot in Costa Rica during a final, futile attempt to restore the United Provinces of Central America.

For Honduras, the first decades of independence were neither peaceful nor prosperous. The country's political turmoil attracted the ambitions of individuals and nations within and outside of Central America. Even geography contributed to its misfortunes. Alone among the Central American republics, Honduras had a border with the three potential rivals for regional hegemony—Guatemala, El Salvador, and Nicaragua. This situation was exacerbated by the political division throughout the isthmus between liberals and conservatives. Any liberal or conservative regime saw a government of the opposite ideology on its borders as a potential threat. In addition, exiled opposition figures tended to gather in states whose governments shared their political affiliation and to use these states as launching pads for efforts to topple their own governments. For the remainder of the century, Honduras's neighbors would constantly interfere in its internal politics.

After the fifteen-month interim presidency of Francisco Zelaya y Ayes (1839–40), conservative General Ferrera became independent Honduras's first elected president. Ferrera's two-year term (1841–42) was followed by a five-year period in which he alternately named himself president or allowed the congress to name an interim president while he maintained control of the country by holding the post then known as minister of war. Ferrera's last notable act was the unsuccessful attempt to depose the liberal Morazán as president of El Salvador. In 1847 Ferrera allowed fellow conservative Juan Lindo to assume the presidency. Under Lindo's presidency, a new constitution was adopted in 1848, and some effort was made to promote education, but any effort to make substantial improvements in the country's situation was doomed by continuing turmoil.

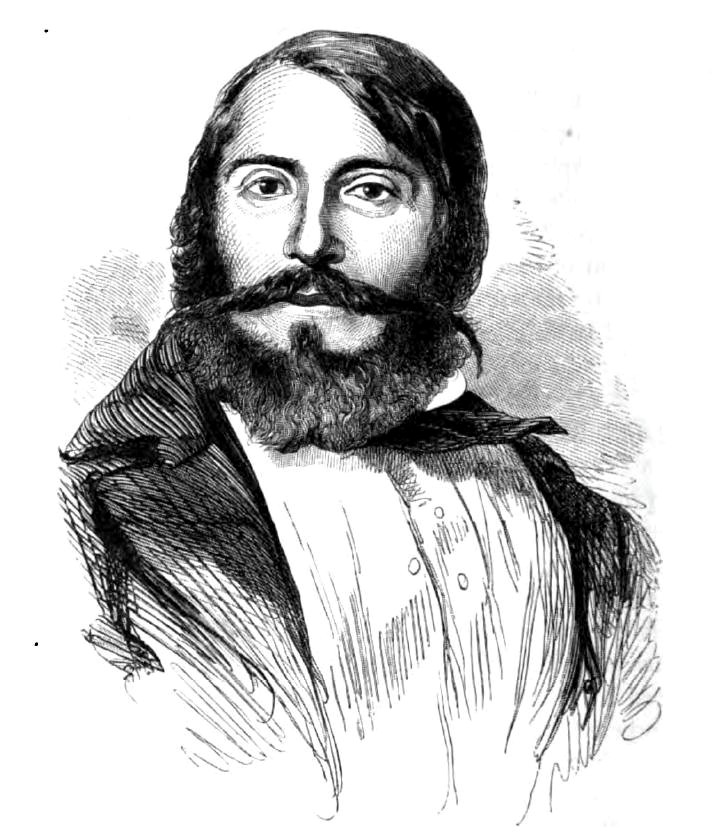
Jose Santos Guardiola was the president of Honduras from 1856 to 1862.

During Lindo's presidency (1847–52), the British began pressuring Honduras for the payment of debts and other claims. In 1849 a British naval force briefly occupied the port of Trujillo, destroying property and extorting 1,200 pesos from the local government. The following year, Lindo's own vice president revolted and was prevented from seizing power only through the military intervention of El Salvador and Nicaragua. All this turmoil may help to explain why Lindo refused an additional presidential term and instead turned over power in 1852 to the opposition liberals, headed by Trinidad Cabañas (1852–55). Three years later, the conservative government of Guatemala invaded Honduras and ousted Cabañas, installing in his place the conservative leader, Jose Santos Guardiola.

The fighting between liberals and conservatives was temporarily set aside because of the 1855 appearance in Central America of an American filibuster, William Walker, who established himself as president of Nicaragua in 1856. Cabañas briefly considered seeking Walker's aid in attempting to return to power. Instead, armies from all the countries of Central America joined to oppose Walker, who was forced to abandon Nicaragua in 1857 and return to the United States.

In 1859 the British agreed to a treaty that recognized Honduran sovereignty over the Islas de la Bahía (Bay Islands). Some of the British settlers in the area objected to this transfer and appealed to Walker for help. Walker evidently thought that his return to Central America would be welcomed by the Honduran liberals, who were once again trying to oust Guardiola. Walker landed on the Honduran coast in 1860 but found little support and encountered determined opposition from both the Hondurans and the British. He surrendered to the British, who promptly handed him over to Honduran authorities. A few days later in 1860, he died in front of a Honduran firing squad.

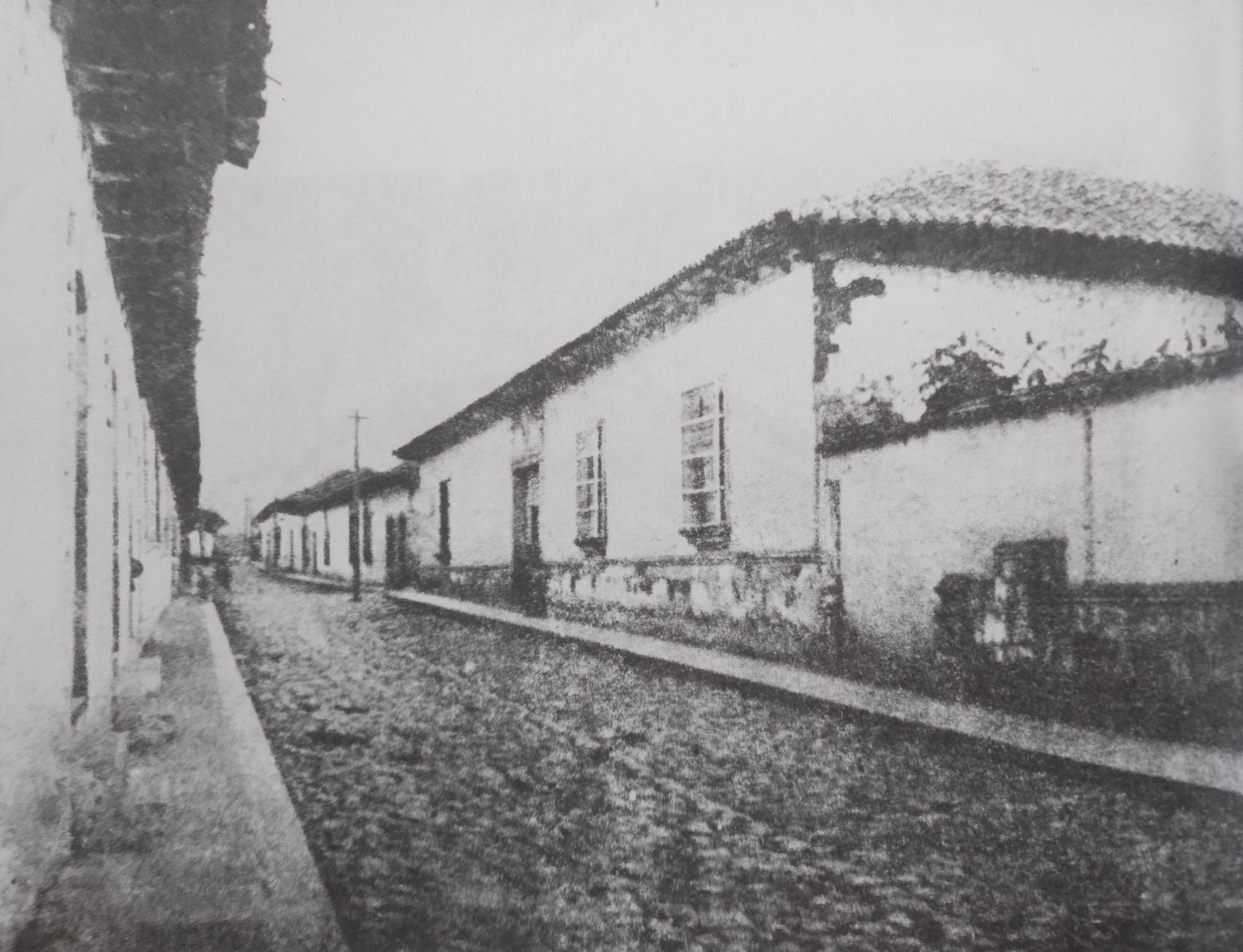
Tegucigalpa in 1862.

The return of the Islas de la Bahía and the death of Walker ended the immediate threat to Honduran territorial integrity, but other Central American nations continued to be involved in Honduran internal affairs. Guardiola was assassinated by his own honor guard in 1862, and the following decade witnessed the presidency change hands almost twenty times. General José María Medina served as president or dictator eleven times during that period, but Guatemalan intervention in 1876 drove him and his conservative supporters from power.

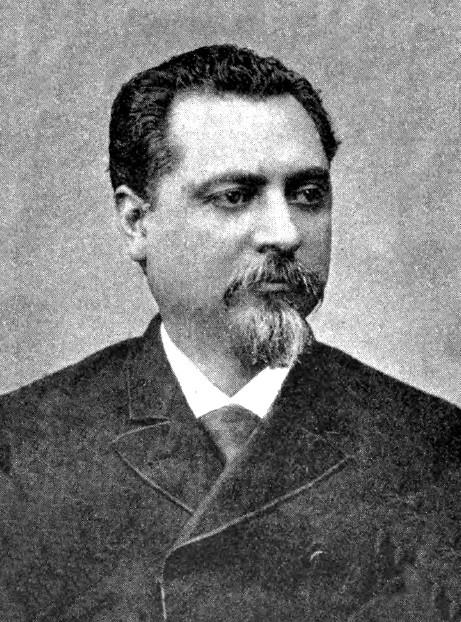
Luis Bogran served as president of Honduras between 1883 and 1891.

From 1876 until 1882, liberal president Marco Aurelio Soto governed Honduras with the support of Guatemalan strongman General Justo Rufino Barrios. Soto succeeded not only in restoring order but also in implementing some basic reforms in finance, education, and public administration. But in 1883, he too fell into disfavor with Barrios and was forced to resign. His successor, General Luis Bográn, survived in office until 1891 when General Ponciano Leiva (who had ruled briefly three times from 1873 to 1876) was returned to power in a manipulated election. Although a liberal, Leiva tried to rule as an absolute dictator, dissolving the fledgling Liberal Party of Honduras (Partido Liberal de Honduras, PLH) and deporting its leaders. The result was another round of civil conflict from which the reconstituted PLH ultimately emerged victorious. The PLH was led by Policarpo Bonilla, with the support of Nicaragua's liberal dictator, José Santos Zelaya.

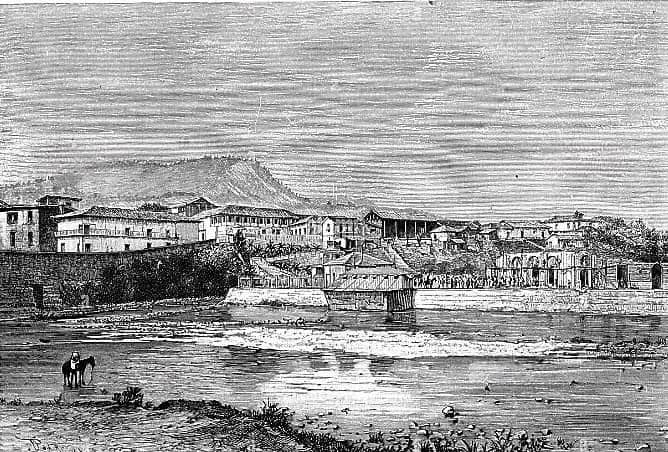
Tegucigalpa in 1890.

When Bonilla assumed power in 1894, he began to restore a limited degree of order to the Honduran political scene. Another constitution was promulgated in 1895, and Bonilla was elected to a four-year term. Bonilla's administration revised civil codes, improved communications, and began an effort to resolve the long-standing boundary dispute with Nicaragua. Bonilla also ensured that in 1899, at the end of his term, he would be succeeded by his military commander, General Terencio Sierra.

The combined impact of civil strife and foreign interventions had doomed Honduras to a position of relative economic and social backwardness throughout the nineteenth century. The country had remained overwhelmingly rural; Tegucigalpa, Comayagua, and San Pedro Sula were the only towns of any size. In the early 1850s, the total population was estimated at 350,000, the overwhelming majority of whom were mestizos. By 1914 the population had grown to only 562,000.

Opportunities for education and culture were limited at best. Mid-nineteenth century records indicate that Honduras had no libraries and no regularly published newspapers. Two universities were maintained, although their quality was questionable. By the 1870s, only 275 schools, having approximately 9,000 pupils, existed in the entire country. In 1873–74, the government budgeted only the equivalent of US$720 for education, a sum designated for the national university.

== Economic situation ==
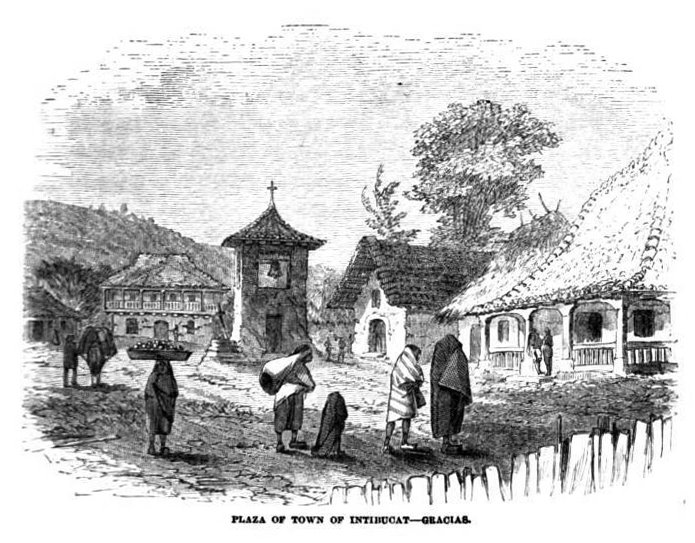
Town of Intibuca, during the mid 19th century Honduras was still a vast agrarian state.

At the end of the colonial period, Honduras' economy was based largely on mining, cattle raising and the export of tropical hardwoods. Unlike most of its neighbors, Honduras did not develop a significant coffee industry, and one of the results of this was that much of its export wealth ended up being generated by foreign firms, often creating little local capital. For much of the nineteenth century, Hondurans looked to mining as a means of improving their economic position.

The mining industry had fallen into severe neglect in the first decades of the century, however. Many mines had been abandoned and flooded. During the years following independence, efforts to revive the industry were generally frustrating for both domestic and foreign entrepreneurs. Effort after effort was abandoned because of civil disturbances, lack of transportation, and poor health conditions.

Mining was revived somewhat in the 1880s, when liberal reforms made foreign investment in mining interesting. A key factor in this revival was the activity of Washington S. Valentine's New York and Honduras Rosario Mining Company (NYHRMC), which had expanded rapidly and had become a major economic and political power within Honduras, not only in silver mining, but in railroad building (the InterOceanic Railroad). Owing in part to the company's efforts, the Honduran government had allowed foreign mining companies to operate in Honduras with a minimum of restrictions and a virtual exemption from taxes. By 1889 the company was annually shipping bullion with a value of over US$700,000 to the United States. Profits from this operation were extremely high; the company's dividends for the first half of 1889 totaled US$150,000.

The NYHRMC's success attracted other companies to Honduras, and gold and silver exports became the principal source of foreign exchange for the rest of the century. The NYHRMC's success stood alone, however; most of the nearly 100 other companies were total failures. The Yuscarán Mining and Milling Company sold over US$5 million in stock but failed to begin effective production. By the end of the nineteenth century, the brief mining boom was in decline, although the NYHRMC would remain a major factor in the Honduran economy until the mid-twentieth century.

Although mining had provided foreign exchange, the vast majority of Hondurans gained their livelihoods from agriculture, usually on a subsistence level. Periodic efforts were made to develop agricultural exports, but they met with little success. Some tobacco, cattle, and hides were exported, mostly to neighboring countries. The recurring civil conflicts and the resultant confiscation of stock by various military commanders, however, put a damper on efforts to develop the cattle industry and contributed to its rather backward status. Some bananas and other fruits were exported from the Islas de la Bahía, much of this trade going to New Orleans, but the volume was small and the benefit for the rest of the nation almost imperceptible.

== Banana republic ==
=== Growth of the banana industry (1899–1906) ===
As bananas emerged as an export after the 1870s, first from the Bay Islands and the mainland, foreign (mostly U.S.) shipping companies began taking the crop to the United States. In 1889 the Vaccaro brothers of New Orleans, founders of what would become the Standard Fruit and Steamship Company (later known as Standard Fruit Company, and then as Dole), shipped their first boatload of bananas from Honduras to New Orleans. The fruit found a ready market, and the trade grew rapidly. By 1902 local railroad lines were being constructed on the Caribbean coast to accommodate the expanding banana production. The economic dominance and political influence of these companies was so great from the late 19th until the mid 20th century that Honduras became the original model for the banana republic.

Banana production in northern Honduras began in the 1880s and was largely in the hands of local people. A census of 1899 revealed that in northern Honduras, that over 1,000 people in the region between Puerto Cortes and La Ceiba (and inland as far as San Pedro Sula) were tending bananas, most of them small holders. The fruit companies received very large concessions of land on which to grow bananas, often forcing small holders who had been growing and exporting bananas off their land or out of business. In addition, they brought in many workers from the British West Indies, especially Jamaica and Belize, both to work on the plantations, but also as lower managers and skilled workers. The companies often favored the West Indian workers because they spoke English and were sometimes better educated than their Honduran counterparts. This perception of foreign occupation, coupled with a growing race-prejudice against the African-descended West Indians led to considerable tension, as the arrival of the West Indians drove demographic change in the region.

Standard Fruit was joined by new rivals, Samuel Zemurray's Cuyamel Fruit Company, and the United Fruit Company, all of which tended to be vertically integrated, owning their own lands and railroad companies and ship lines such as United's "Great White Fleet". Through land subsidies granted to the railroads, by 1920 they controlled vast tracts of the best land along the Caribbean coast. Coastal cities such as La Ceiba, Tela, and Trujillo and towns further inland such as El Progreso an La Lima became virtual company towns.

=== Grants and the 1902 election ===
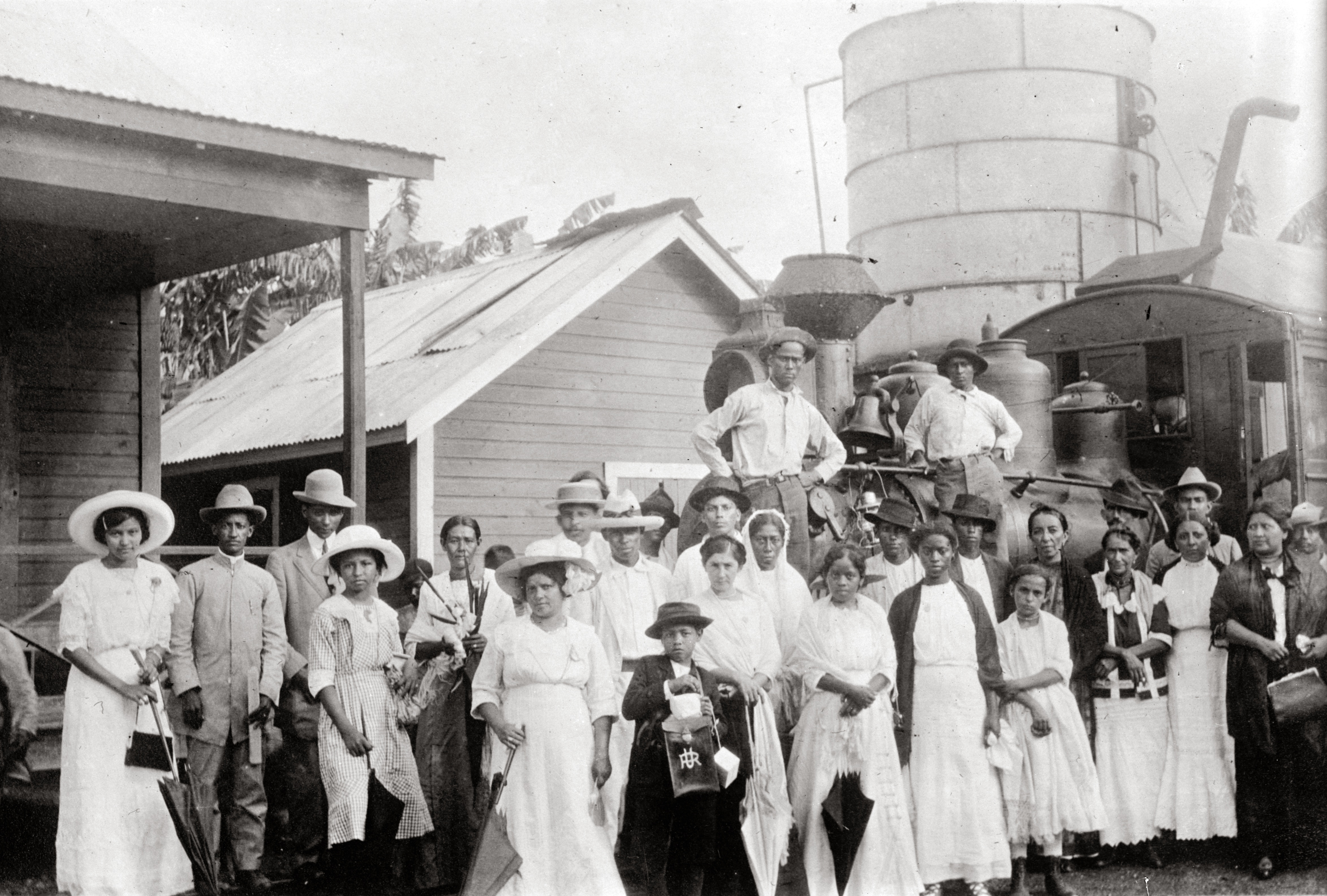
Railway Station in La Ceiba at the beginning of the 20th century

General Terencio Sierra succeeded Policarpo Bonilla in 1899. His administration gave Honduras one of the more important historical factors in the economic life and politics of the country. Marvin Barahona in his book Honduras in the 20th century relates that "the Vaccaro brothers, a family of Italian origin that traded bananas in New Orleans, received land grants on the north coast. In return, they agreed to build railways over an extensive area. The land was awarded according to the number of kilometers of railway built, with 250 hectares per kilometer of railroad the going rate. The Vaccaros, as other dealers in the north coast would later also do, took advantage of the privileges awarded them and the land grants to export bananas from La Ceiba".

On 1 March 1902, the people were called to choose a successor to Sierra. General Manuel Bonilla was one candidate, sponsored by prominent liberals and by the conservative party, the National Party. Another was Dr. Juan Ángel Arias Boquín of the Liberal Party.

General Manuel Bonilla won the election with 28,550 votes vs 25,118 for Doctor Juan Ángel Arias Boquín and 4,857 for Doctor Marco Aurelio Soto. As writer and politician Ángel Zuñiga Huete said, voters did not give an absolute majority to any of the contenders as required by the constitution. Therefore, the National Congress had to choose the president and designated Juan Ángel Arias Boquín and General Máximo Betancourt Rosales as vice-president. Arias and Rosales took charge of the government on February 18, 1903.

=== Manuel Bonilla ===
Presidential candidate Manuel Bonilla did not accept the choice of Congress and went to war against Arias. On April 13, the forces of General Bonilla captured the capital and other parts of the country, and the government of Arias fell. Once in power, Manuel Bonilla summoned Congress and forced it to reconsider the results of the elections of 1902. This time, the congress declared Bonilla president and Miguel R. Dávila vice-president. They took power on May 17, 1903.

Once in power, Bonilla suppressed freedom of press as well as his political opposition, even imprisoning ex-president Policarpo Bonilla. In February 1904, Manuel Bonilla dissolved the legislative assembly and ordered the arrest of nine opposition legislators, on the pretext of a plan to murder him.

Bonilla assumed dictatorial powers and afterward summoned a constituent assembly which revoked the constitution of 1894 and reinstated a big part of the constitution of 1880. This constitution stipulated that the presidential term of office would be six instead of four years, as Bonilla's circle hoped to govern without hindrance until 1912. The new constitution went into effect on January 1, 1906.

=== Government and attainments of Bonilla ===
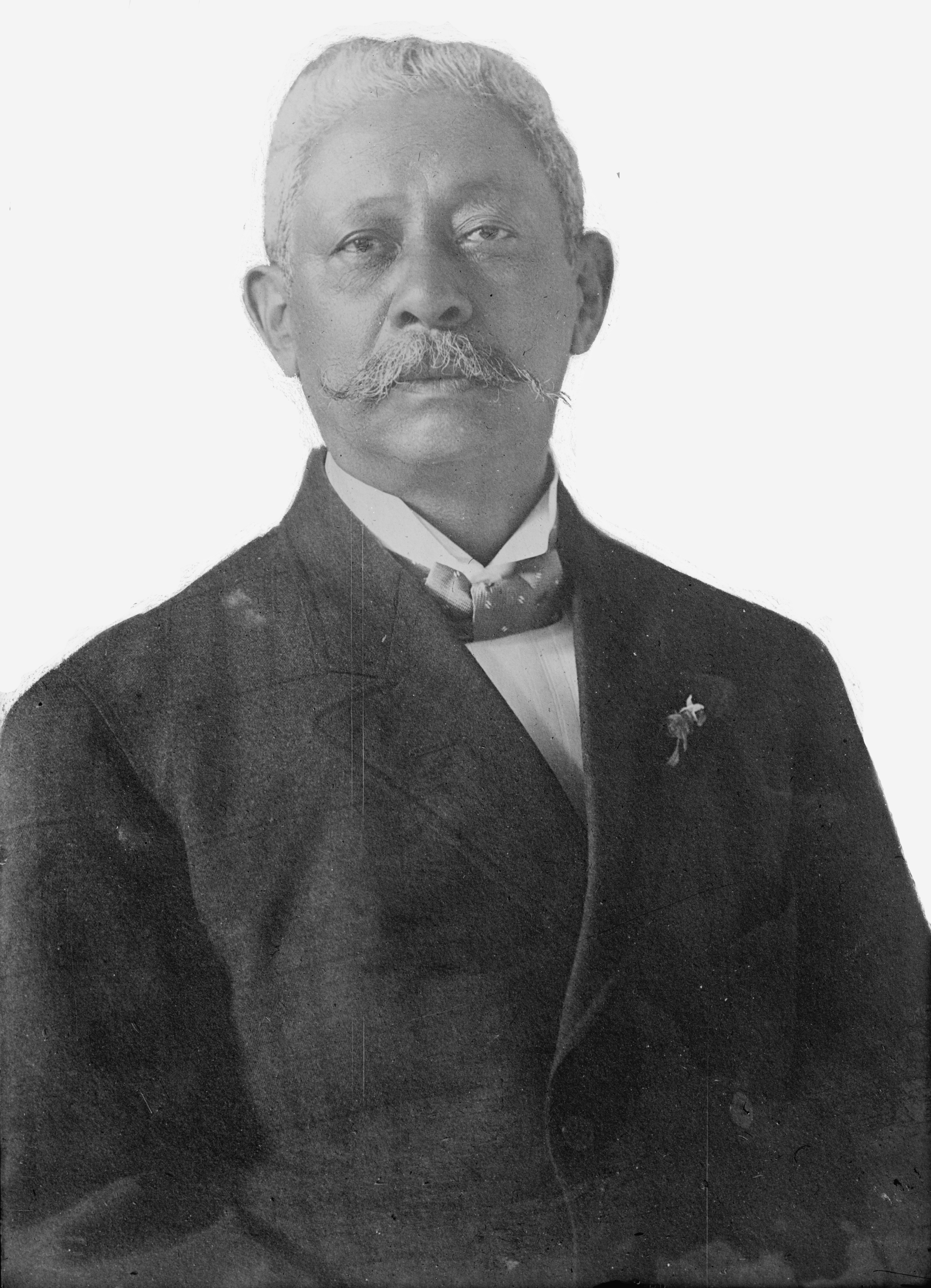
Manuel Bonilla

Manuel Bonilla, as president, turned out to be an even better friend to the banana companies than Terencio Sierra. During his term, the banana companies won exemptions from taxes and obtained permission to build docks, roads, and canals, to canalize the Salado and El Porvenir rivers, and to construct a new railway. Among Bonilla's accomplishments are infrastructure improvements, especially to roadways, and in particular to the road from Tegucigalpa to the Pacific coast. On the international front, Bonilla made pacts of friendship with Nicaragua, and later with Guatemala and El Salvador. He reorganised the conservatives into a single political party. The current National Party of Honduras (PNH) has its origins in his administration.

Perhaps the greatest of Bonilla's achievements was the delimitation of the border with Nicaragua, especially in the zone of La Mosquitia, where there had been a long dispute. In 1894, a treaty provided for the creation of a boundary commission with members from both Honduras and Nicaragua to resolve the dispute. Before 1904, the commission had only agreed on the lower part of the border. In 1904, in order to reach an agreement about the upper part of the border, the representatives of the two nations turned to King Alfonso XIII of Spain as a neutral party to the dispute.

His decision, announced in 1906, gave the greater part of the territory in dispute to Honduras, establishing the upper border along the River Coco. At the time, both governments accepted the decision, although in 1912, Nicaragua raised new objections which were resolved in 1960, in favor of King Alfonso's arbitration.

=== Fall of Bonilla ===
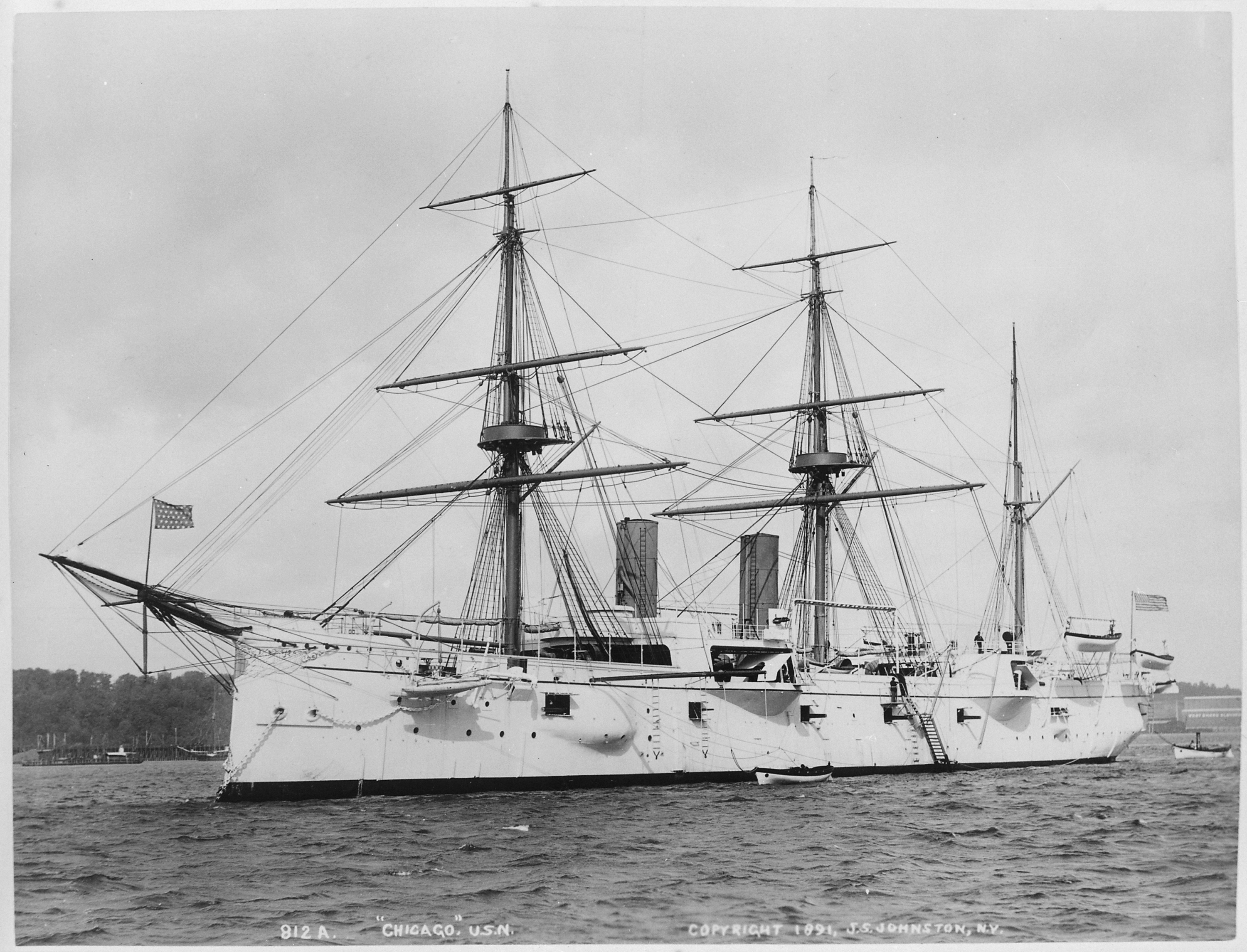
USS Chicago

In 1906, Manuel Bonilla successfully resisted an invasion from Guatemala, but this was his last big success. The pact of friendship that he signed in 1906 with Guatemala and El Salvador was interpreted as an anti-Nicaraguan alliance by President José Santos Zelaya of Nicaragua. Zelaya began to offer support to the liberal exiles of Honduras in his country in an effort to overthrow Manuel Bonilla, who had become, in effect, a dictator. With the support of elements of the Army of Nicaragua, the exiles invaded Honduras in February 1907 and established a provisional government.

Bonilla tried to resist with the help of Salvadorian forces, but in March, his forces were defeated decisively. The battle was particularly notable as the introduction of machine guns to the civil conflicts of Central America. The United States disapproved of the role played by Nicaraguan president Zelaya in the internal affairs of Honduras. When the Nicaraguan army entered Honduras in 1907, the American government, thinking that Zelaya wanted to dominate the entire region, sent marines to Puerto Cortés to protect the banana businesses. Other naval units were sent to Amapala in the Gulf of Fonseca to prevent attacks against the last-occupied positions of Manuel Bonilla, who took refuge on the USS Chicago. With this, the fight against Bonilla came to an end.

The Chargé d'affaires in Tegucigalpa played an active role in the organization of a peace treaty, which displeased Zelaya. The treaty installed a provisional government composed of Miguel Oquelí Bustillo, Máximo Rosales Betancourt and Juan Ignacio Castro, until the end of March 1907.

== Political issues and U. S. intervention ==
For the next twenty years, the U.S. government was involved in quelling Central American disputes, insurrections, and revolutions, whether supported by neighboring governments or by United States companies. As part of the so-called Banana Wars all around the Caribbean, Honduras saw the insertion of American troops in 1903, 1907, 1911, 1912, 1919, 1924 and 1925. For instance, in 1917 the Cuyamel Fruit Company extended its rail lines into disputed Guatemalan territory.

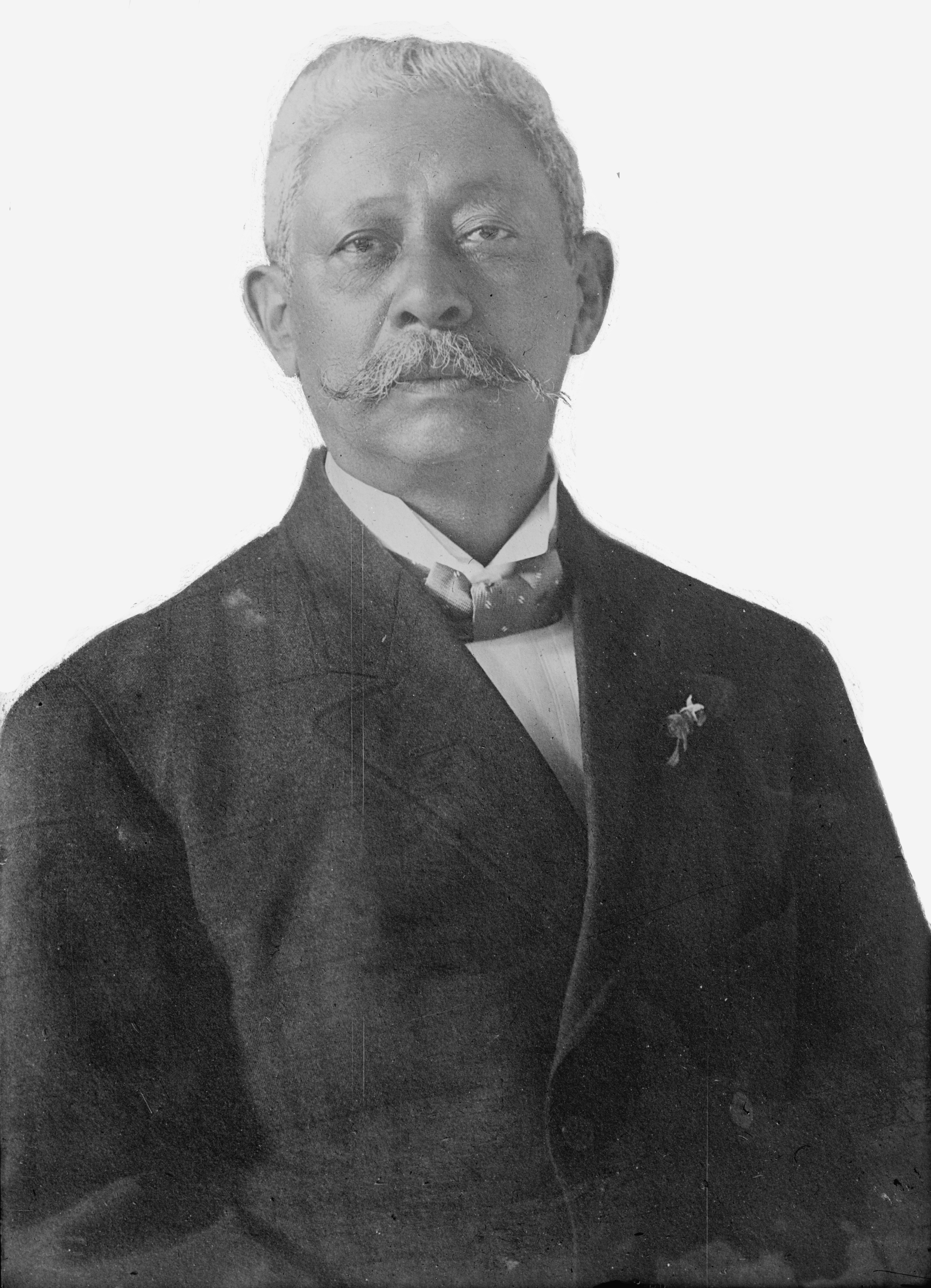
Manuel Bonilla was president of Honduras from 1903 to 1907 and again from 1912 to 1913

Although the peaceful transfer of power from Bonilla to General Sierra in 1899 was important as the first time in decades that such a constitutional transition had taken place, that year was a watershed in another, even more important, sense.

Sierra's efforts to perpetuate himself in office led to his overthrow in 1903 by General Manuel Bonilla, who proved to be an even greater friend of the banana companies than Sierra had been. Companies gained exemptions from taxes and permission to construct wharves and roads, as well as permission to improve interior waterways and to obtain charters for new railroad construction.

Conservative Manuel Bonilla was an opponent rather than a relative or friend of Sierra's liberal predecessor, Policarpo Bonilla. During Manuel Bonilla's term in office, he imprisoned ex-president Policarpo Bonilla for over two years and took other steps to suppress his political opposition, the liberals, who were the only group with an organized political party. The conservatives were divided into a host of personalist factions and lacked coherent leadership. Manuel Bonilla made some efforts to reorganize the conservatives into a "national party." The present-day National Party of Honduras (Partido Nacional de Honduras, PNH) traces its origins to his administration.

Manuel Bonilla promoted some internal improvements, notably road building. He improved the route from Tegucigalpa to the Pacific coast. On the international front, he concluded friendship pacts with Nicaragua and later with Guatemala and El Salvador.

Of perhaps greatest significance was the work accomplished during Manuel Bonillo's administration to delineate the long-disputed border with Nicaragua. The area, called the Mosquitia region, was located in the eastern part of the country in the department of Gracias a Dios. The area was large but virtually unpopulated except for small groups of Miskito who owed little allegiance to either nation. In 1894 a treaty provided for the establishment of a boundary commission, composed of representatives of Honduras and Nicaragua, to resolve the dispute.

By 1904 the commission had been able to agree on only the lower part of the boundary. In that year, to reach agreement on the upper part, the representatives of the two nations picked King Alfonso XIII of Spain as a neutral, third member of the commission, in effect making him the arbiter. His decision, announced in 1906, gave the bulk of the disputed territory to Honduras, establishing the upper boundary line along the Río Coco. At the time, both governments accepted the decision, but in 1912 Nicaragua raised new objections. The dispute was finally resolved in favor of the 1906 arbitration only in 1960.

In 1906 Manuel Bonilla successfully resisted an invasion from Guatemala, but this was his last major success. The friendship pact with Guatemala and El Salvador signed in 1906 was interpreted as an anti-Nicaraguan alliance by the Nicaraguans. Nicaragua's powerful President Zelaya began to support exiled Honduran liberals in their efforts to topple Manuel Bonilla, who had become, in effect, the Honduran dictator. Supported by elements of the Nicaraguan army, the exiles invaded Honduras in February 1907 and established a provisional junta. With the assistance of Salvadoran troops, Manuel Bonilla tried to resist, but in March his forces were decisively beaten in a battle notable for the introduction of machine guns into Central American civil strife.

== Peace Treaty of 1907 ==
=== Election of Miguel Rafael Dávila ===
On April 28, 1907, the provisional government gave control to Miguel Rafael Dávila Cuéllar, who had been vice-president under Manuel Bonilla. Dávila summoned a constituent assembly, which re-established the constitution of 1894 and called elections. Dávila was elected president for the 1908–12 term.

Miguel R. Dávila did not have the confidence of Nicaraguan president José Santos Zelaya. The prospect of new conflicts caught the attention of the American president, Theodore Roosevelt. Taking into account the strong economic interests of the United States, as much in Nicaragua as in Honduras, Roosevelt summoned leaders of the two countries, as well as leaders from Costa Rica, El Salvador, and Guatemala, to a conference in Washington.

The "Central American Peace Conference of 1907" strove to reduce the level of conflict in the region. Honduras proposed to re-establish the Union of Central American States, but this was not accepted. However, other measures were adopted. The five presidents signed the treaty which first incorporated the Tobar Doctrine and established the Permanent Central American Court of Justice, to resolve future disputes.

The treaty also committed the five countries to restrict the activities of exiles from neighboring states and put in place a basis for legal extraditions. Of special interest was a clause, sponsored by the United States, which established the permanent neutrality of Honduras in future Central American conflicts.

The five states pledged to deny recognition to governments that came to power by revolutionary means. The United States and Mexico, who had acted as co-sponsors of the conference, also pledged to deny recognition to such governments. From the point of view of the US State Department, these agreements represented an important step in the stabilization of Central America and of Honduras in particular.

The first challenge to this treaty came in Honduras in 1908; opponents of Dávila, with the support of Guatemala and El Salvador, invaded the country. Nicaragua supported the Honduran president, and war seemed imminent. But in fear of American intervention, the parties involved agreed to subject the controversy to the new Central American Court. The court ultimately denied the complaints of Honduras and Nicaragua, and rebellion against Dávila was controlled. With this, peace in Honduras briefly returned.

=== Dávila and the external debt ===
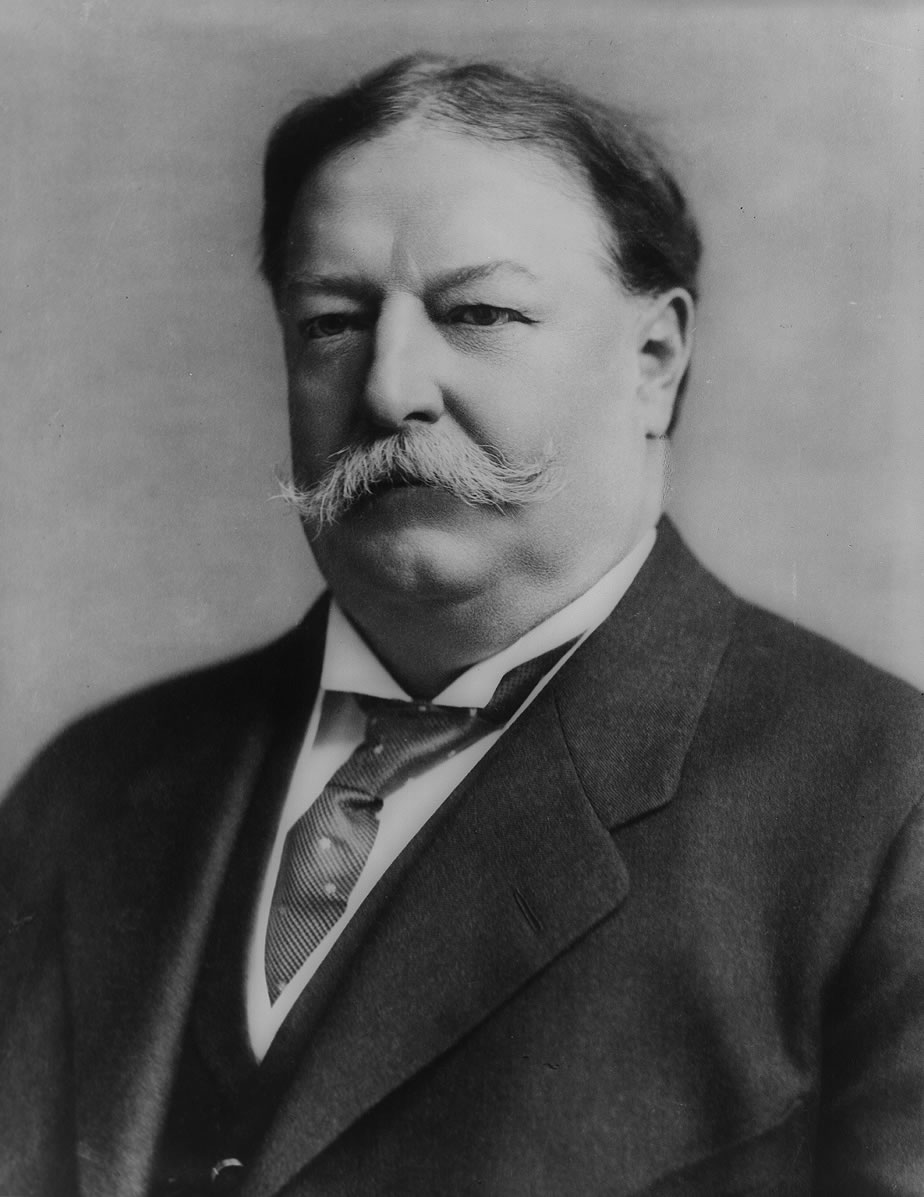
William Howard Taft

During his administration, Miguel Dávila tried to modernize the country, but in addition to struggling against the opposition, the president had the difficult task of leading at a time when the external debt of Honduras had reached US$120 million. According to the administration of US president William Howard Taft, the debt was a factor that contributed to the political and social unsteadiness of the country. Because of this, Dávila initiated efforts to repay the debt, much of it owed to England.

Negotiations were organized between the representatives of Honduras and the bankers of New York, led by JP Morgan. At the end of 1909, an agreement was reached to reduce the debt and issue new bonds at 5% interest. In exchange, the bankers would control the railway of Honduras, and the government of the United States would control customs revenue, while still guaranteeing the independence of the Honduran state.

In Honduras, great opposition to the terms proposed by the bankers weakened the government of Dávila even more. When he tried to carry out the terms of the agreement, this was seen by the Hondurans as a violation of national sovereignty. For this reason, in a rare show of independence, the National Congress of Honduras initially refused the proposals by a vote of thirty-three to five. But Dávila continued pressing the Congress until they approved.

=== Renunciation of President Dávila ===
In the midst of all the problems facing Dávila's administration, he wanted to put an end to the generous concessions granted to fruit companies. This provoked the wrath of Samuel Zemurray, the owner of the Cuyamel Fruit Company, who determined to fund a revolution against Dávila in order to overthrow him. He recruited the help of ex-president Manuel Bonilla and American mercenaries led by Lee Christmas.

The foreign debt issue was put on hold due to the 1911 uprising against President Dávila. He immediately called on his forces to confront the forces of former President Bonilla, however, the US government offered to mediate in the conflict. From February 21 to March 15, 1911, representatives from both sides met on board the USS Tacoma in the bay of Puerto Cortés,.

The revolutionaries headed by ex-president Manuel Bonilla and the Dávila government agreed to a cease-fire, with the forced resignation of president Dávila and the installation of a provisional president. The US mediator, Thomas Dawson, selected Francisco Bertrand as provisional president and he in return agreed to hold free elections.

== Expanded role of the United States (1907–1919) ==
Until the early twentieth century, the United States had played only a very limited role in internal Honduran political clashes. Because there was not a resident United States minister in Tegucigalpa, the minister to Guatemala had been accredited for that position. The presence of the United States in the Caribbean increased following the Spanish–American War (1898), however. The decision to build a canal through Panama and expanded commercial activities led to a more active role for the United States government, as well as for United States companies.

By 1907 the United States looked with considerable disfavor on the role Zelaya of Nicaragua was playing in regional affairs. When the Nicaraguan army entered Honduras in 1907 to overthrow Bonilla, the United States government, believing that Zelaya wanted to dominate the entire region, landed marines at Puerto Cortés to protect the North American bananas trade. Other United States naval units prevented a Nicaraguan attack on Bonilla's last position at Amapala in the Golfo de Fonseca. After negotiations conducted by the United States naval commander, Manuel Bonilla sought refuge on the USS Chicago, and the fighting came to an end.

The United States chargé d'affaires in Tegucigalpa took an active role in arranging a final peace settlement, with which Zelaya was less than happy. The settlement provided for the installation of a compromise regime, headed by General Miguel Dávila, in Tegucigalpa. Dávila was a liberal but was distrusted by Zelaya, who made a secret arrangement with El Salvador to oust him from office. This plan failed to reach fruition, but the United States, alarmed by the threat of renewed conflict in Central America, called the five Central American presidents to a conference in Washington in November.

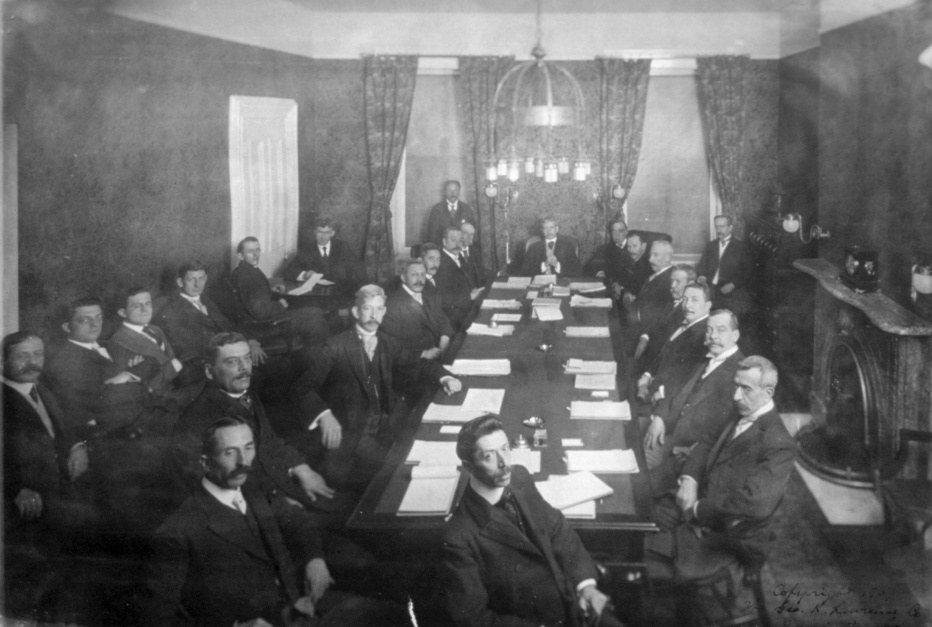
The opening session of the Central American Peace Conference, 1907.

The Central American Peace Conference of 1907 made a major effort to reduce the level of conflict within the region. A Honduran proposal to reestablish the political union of the Central American states failed to achieve acceptance, but several other measures were adopted. The five presidents signed the General Treaty of Peace and Amity of 1907 pledging themselves to establish the permanent Central American Court of Justice, which would resolve future disputes. The treaty also committed the five countries to restrict the activities of exiles from neighboring states and provided the basis for legal extraditions. Of special interest was a United States-sponsored clause that provided for the permanent neutrality of Honduras in any future Central American conflicts.

Another convention adopted by all five states committed the signers to withhold recognition from governments that seized power by revolutionary means. The United States and Mexico, which had acted as cosponsors of the conference, indicated informally that they would also deny recognition to such governments. From the point of view of the United States Department of State, these agreements represented a major step toward stabilizing Central America in general and Honduras in particular.

The first test of the new treaty involved Honduras. In 1908 opponents of President Dávila, probably supported by Guatemala and El Salvador, invaded the country. Nicaragua supported the Honduran president, and war seemed imminent. Perhaps motivated by the possibility of United States intervention, however, the parties agreed to submit the dispute to the new Central American court. The court ultimately rejected the Honduran and Nicaraguan complaints, but in the meantime the revolt collapsed, thus briefly restoring peace to Honduras.

Along with fighting off efforts to overthrow him, President Dávila made some attempts to modernize Honduras. He invited a Chilean officer to establish a regular military academy, which failed to survive beyond his time in office. Like his predecessor, Dávila encouraged the activities of the banana companies. The companies, however, were less than totally happy with him, viewing his administration as ineffective. In addition, rivalry among the companies became a factor in Honduran politics. In 1910 Dávila's administration granted the Vaccaro brothers a generous rail concession that included a provision prohibiting any rival line within twenty kilometers. This concession angered Samuel Zemurray of the newly formed Cuyamel Fruit Company. Zemurray had encouraged and even helped finance the 1908 invasion and was to continue to make trouble for the Dávila administration.

Despite the failure of the 1908 uprising, the United States remained concerned over Honduran instability. The administration of William Howard Taft saw the huge Honduran debt, over US$120 million, as a contributing factor to this instability and began efforts to refinance the largely British debt with provisions for a United States customs receivership or some similar arrangement. Negotiations were arranged between Honduran representatives and New York bankers, headed by J.P. Morgan. By the end of 1909, an agreement had been reached providing for a reduction in the debt and the issuance of new 5 percent bonds: the bankers would control the Honduran railroad, and the United States government would guarantee continued Honduran independence and would take control of customs revenue.

The terms proposed by the bankers met with considerable opposition in Honduras, further weakening the Dávila government. A treaty incorporating the key provisions was finally signed in January 1911 and submitted to the Honduran legislature by Dávila. However, that body, in a rare display of independence, rejected it by a vote of thirty-three to five.

An uprising in 1911 against Dávila interrupted efforts to deal with the debt problem. The United States stepped in to mediate the conflict, bringing both sides to a conference on one of its warships. The revolutionaries, headed by former president Manuel Bonilla, and the government agreed to a cease-fire and the installation of a provisional president who would be selected by the United States mediator, Thomas Dawson. Dawson selected Francisco Bertrand, who promised to hold early, free elections, and Dávila resigned. The 1912 elections were won by Manuel Bonilla, but he died after just over a year in office. Bertrand, who had been his vice president, returned to the presidency and in 1916 won election for a term that lasted until 1920.

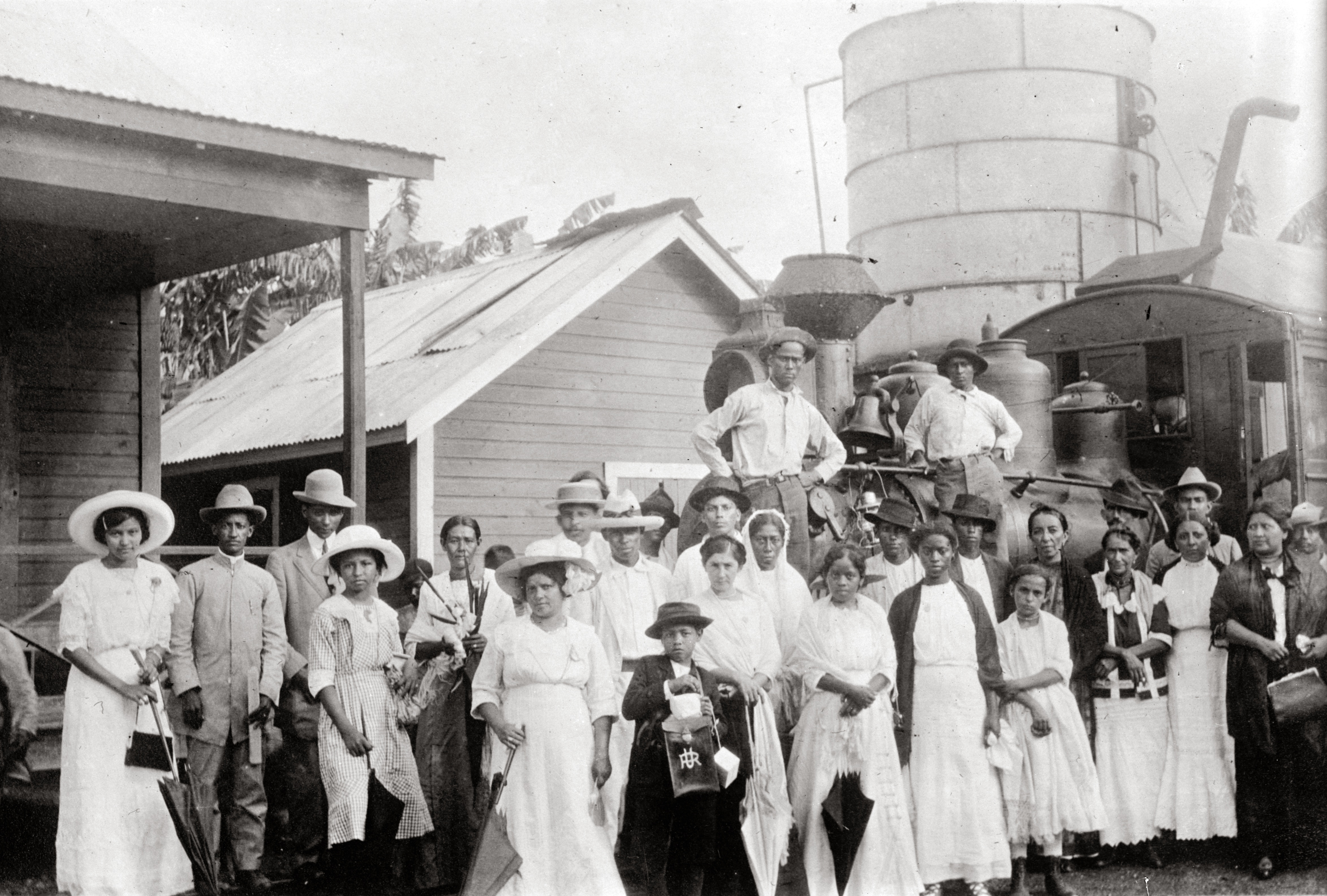
A railroad station in La Ceiba, c. 1915.

The relative stability of the 1911–20 period was difficult to maintain. Revolutionary intrigues continued throughout the period, accompanied by constant rumors that one faction or another was being supported by one of the banana companies. Rivalry among these companies had escalated in 1910 when the United Fruit Company had entered Honduras. In 1913 United Fruit established the Tela Railroad Company and shortly thereafter a similar subsidiary, the Trujillo Railroad Company. The railroad companies were given huge land subsidies by the Honduran government for each kilometer of track they constructed.

The government expected that in exchange for land the railroad companies would ultimately build a national rail system, providing the capital with its long-sought access to the Caribbean. The banana companies, however, had other ideas in mind. They used the railroads to open up new banana lands, rather than to reach existing cities. Through the resultant land subsidies, they soon came to control the overwhelming share of the best land along the Caribbean coast. Coastal cities such as La Ceiba, Tela, and Trujillo and towns further inland such as El Progreso and La Lima became virtual company towns, and the power of the companies often exceeded the authority wielded in the region by local governments.

For the next two decades, the United States government was involved in opposing Central American revolutions whether the revolutions were supported by foreign governments or by United States companies. During the 1912–21 period, warships were frequently dispatched to areas of revolutionary activity, both to protect United States interests and to exert a dampening effect on the revolutionaries. In 1917 the disputes among the companies threatened to involve Honduras in a war with Guatemala. The Cuyamel Fruit Company, supported by the Honduran government, had begun to extend its rail lines into disputed territory along the Guatemalan border. The Guatemalans, supported by the United Fruit Company, sent troops into the area, and it seemed for a time that war might break out. United States mediation ended the immediate threat, but the dispute smoldered until 1930 when a second United States mediation finally produced a settlement.

The development of the banana industry contributed to the beginnings of organized labor movements in Honduras and to the first major strikes in the nation's history. The first of these occurred in 1917 against the Cuyamel Fruit Company. The strike was suppressed by the Honduran military, but the following year additional labor disturbances occurred at the Standard Fruit Company's holding in La Ceiba. In 1920 a general strike hit the Caribbean coast. In response, a United States warship was dispatched to the area, and the Honduran government began arresting leaders. When Standard Fruit offered a new wage equivalent to US$1.75 per day, the strike ultimately collapsed. Labor troubles in the banana area, however, were far from ended.

World War I had a generally negative impact on Honduras. In 1914 banana prices began to fall, and, in addition, the war reduced the overall amount of agricultural exports. The United States entry into the war in 1917 diverted ships to the war effort, making imported goods, such as textiles, scarce. The shortages of goods in turn led to inflation, and the decline in trade reduced government revenues from tariffs. The banana companies, however, continued to prosper; Standard Fruit reported earnings of nearly US$2.5 million in 1917. Despite its problems, Honduras supported the United States war effort and declared war on Germany in 1918.

== The threat of renewed instability (1919–24) ==
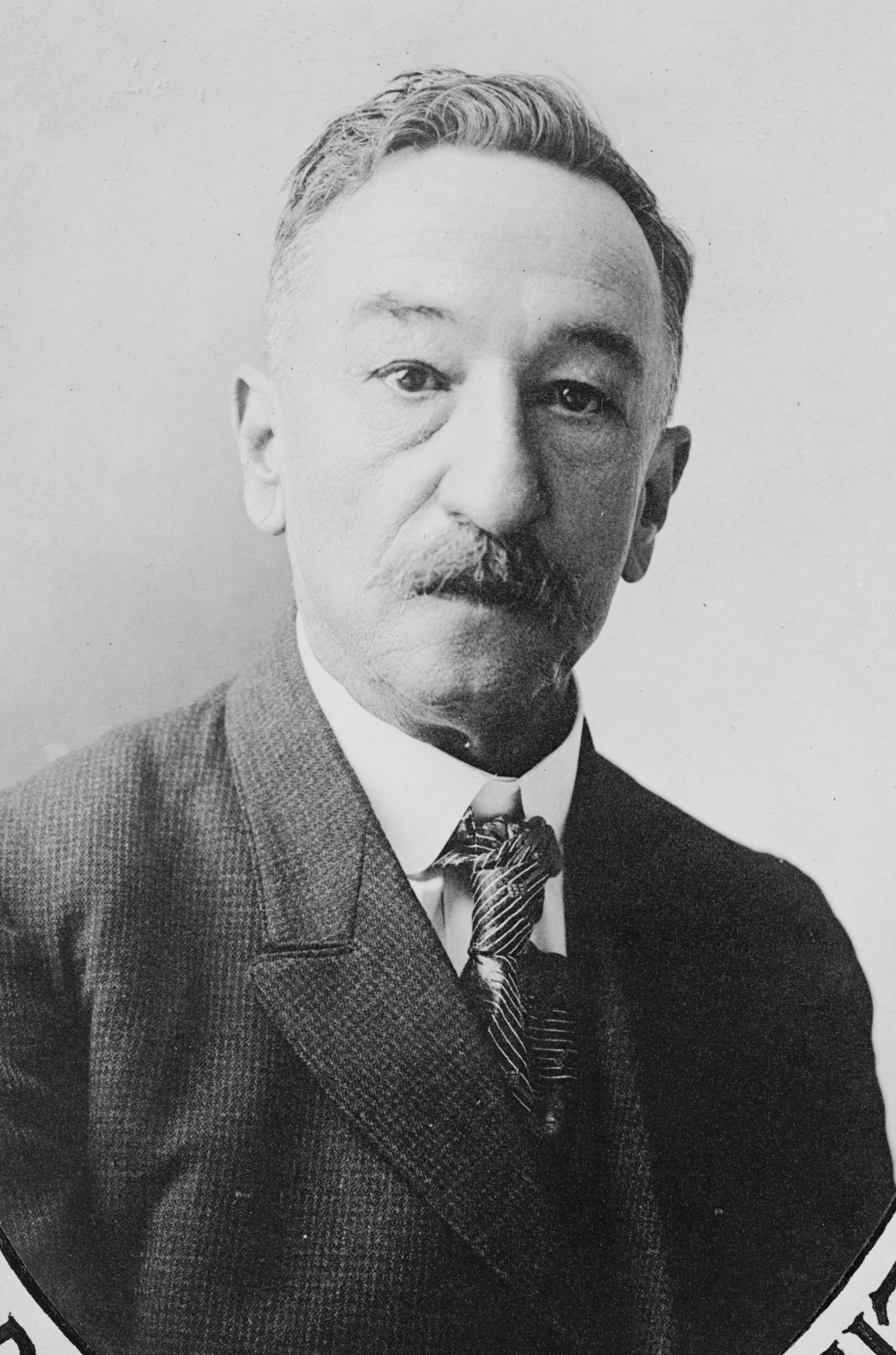
Rafael López Gutiérrez served as president of Honduras from 1920 to 1924.

In 1919 it became obvious that Bertrand would refuse to allow an open election to choose his successor. Such a course of action was opposed by the United States and had little popular support in Honduras. The local military commander and governor of Tegucigalpa, General Rafael López Gutiérrez, took the lead in organizing PLH opposition to Bertrand, the opposition to Bertrand caused the First Honduran Civil War, also known as the Revolution of 19. López Gutiérrez also solicited support from the liberal government of Guatemala and even from the conservative regime in Nicaragua. Bertrand, in turn, sought support from El Salvador. Determined to avoid an international conflict, the United States, after some hesitation, offered to meditate the dispute, hinting to the Honduran president that if he refused the offer, open intervention might follow.

Bertrand promptly resigned and left the country. The United States ambassador helped arrange the installation of an interim government headed by Francisco Bográn, who promised to hold free elections. However, General López Gutiérrez, who now effectively controlled the military situation, made it clear that he was determined to be the next president. After considerable negotiation and some confusion, a formula was worked out under which elections were held. López Gutiérrez won easily in a manipulated election, and in October 1920 he assumed the presidency.

During Bográn's brief time in office, he had agreed to a United States proposal to invite a United States financial adviser to Honduras. Arthur N. Young of the Department of State was selected for this task and began work in Honduras in August 1920, continuing to August 1921. While there, Young compiled extensive data and made numerous recommendations, even persuading the Hondurans to hire a New York police lieutenant to reorganize their police forces. Young's investigations clearly demonstrated the desperate need for major financial reforms in Honduras, whose always precarious budgetary situation was considerably worsened by the renewal of revolutionary activities.

In 1919, for example, the military had spent more than double the amount budgeted for them, accounting for over 57 percent of all federal expenditures. Young's recommendations for reducing the military budget, however, found little favor with the new López Gutiérrez administration, and the government's financial condition remained a major problem. If anything, continued uprisings against the government and the threat of a renewed Central America conflict made the situation even worse. From 1919 to 1924, the Honduran government expended US$7.2 million beyond the amount covered by the regular budgets for military operations.

From 1920 through 1923, seventeen uprisings or attempted coups in Honduras contributed to growing United States concern over political instability in Central America. In August 1922, the presidents of Honduras, Nicaragua, and El Salvador met on the USS Tacoma in the Golfo de Fonseca. Under the watchful eye of the United States ambassadors to their nations, the presidents pledged to prevent their territories from being used to promote revolutions against their neighbors and issued a call for a general meeting of Central American states in Washington at the end of the year.

The Washington conference concluded in February with the adoption of the General Treaty of Peace and Amity of 1923, which had eleven supplemental conventions. The treaty in many ways followed the provisions of the 1907 treaty. The Central American court was reorganized, reducing the influence of the various governments over its membership. The clause providing for withholding recognition of revolutionary governments was expanded to preclude recognition of any revolutionary leader, his relatives, or anyone who had been in power six months before or after such an uprising unless the individual's claim to power had been ratified by free elections. The governments renewed their pledges to refrain from aiding revolutionary movements against their neighbors and to seek peaceful resolutions for all outstanding disputes.

The supplemental conventions covered everything from the promotion of agriculture to the limitation of armaments. One, which remained unratified, provided for free trade among all of the states except Costa Rica. The arms limitation agreement set a ceiling on the size of each nation's military forces (2,500 men for Honduras) and included a United States-sponsored pledge to seek foreign assistance in establishing more professional armed forces.

The October 1923 Honduran presidential elections and the subsequent political and military conflicts provided the first real tests of these new treaty arrangements. Under heavy pressure from Washington, López Gutiérrez allowed an unusually open campaign and election. The long-fragmented conservatives had reunited in the form of the National Party of Honduras (Partido Nacional de Honduras, PNH), which ran as its candidate General Tiburcio Carías Andino, the governor of the department of Cortés. However, the liberal PLH was unable to unite around a single candidate and split into two groups, one supporting former president Policarpo Bonilla, the other advancing the candidacy of Juan Angel Arias. As a result, no candidate secured a majority. Carías received the greatest number of votes, with Bonilla second, and Arias a distant third. By the terms of the Honduran constitution, this stalemate left the final choice of president up to the legislature, but that body was unable to obtain a quorum and reach a decision.

In January 1924, López Gutiérrez announced his intention to remain in office until new elections could be held, but he repeatedly refused to specify a date for the elections. Carías, reportedly with the support of United Fruit, declared himself president, and an armed conflict broke out. In February the United States, warning that recognition would be withheld from anyone coming to power by revolutionary means, suspended relations with the López Gutiérrez government for its failure to hold elections.

Conditions rapidly deteriorated in the early months of 1924. On February 28, a pitched battle took place in La Ceiba between government troops and rebels. Even the presence of the USS Denver and the landing of a force of United States Marines were unable to prevent widespread looting and arson resulting in over US$2 million in property damage. Fifty people, including a United States citizen, were killed in the fighting. In the weeks that followed, additional vessels from the United States Navy Special Service Squadron were concentrated in Honduran waters, and landing parties were put ashore at various points to protect United States interests. One force of marines and sailors was even dispatched inland to Tegucigalpa to provide additional protection for the United States legation. Shortly before the arrival of the force, López Gutiérrez died, and what authority remained with the central government was being exercised by his cabinet. General Carías and a variety of other rebel leaders controlled most of the countryside but failed to coordinate their activities effectively enough to seize the capital.

In an effort to end the fighting, the United States government dispatched Sumner Welles to the port of Amapala; he had instructions to try to produce a settlement that would bring to power a government eligible for recognition under the terms of the 1923 treaty. Negotiations, which were once again held on board a United States cruiser, lasted from April 23 to April 28. An agreement was worked out that provided for an interim presidency headed by General Vicente Tosta, who agreed to appoint a cabinet representing all political factions and to convene a Constituent Assembly within ninety days to restore constitutional order. Presidential elections were to be held as soon as possible, and Tosta promised to refrain from being a candidate. Once in office, the new president showed signs of reneging on some of his pledges, especially those related to the appointment of a bipartisan cabinet. Under heavy pressure from the United States delegation, however, he ultimately complied with the provisions of the peace agreement.

Keeping the 1924 elections on track proved to be a difficult task. To put pressure on Tosta to conduct a fair election, the United States continued an embargo on arms to Honduras and barred the government from access to loans—including a requested US$75,000 from the Banco Atlántida. Furthermore, the United States persuaded El Salvador, Guatemala, and Nicaragua to join in declaring that, under the 1923 treaty provision, no leader of the recent revolution would be recognized as president for the coming term. These pressures ultimately helped persuade Carías to withdraw his candidacy and also helped ensure the defeat of an uprising led by General Gregorio Ferrera of the PNH. The PNH nominated Miguel Paz Barahona (1925–29), a civilian, for president. The PLH, after some debate, refused to nominate a candidate, and on December 28 Paz Barahona won virtual unanimous election.

=== 1923 Peace Treaty ===
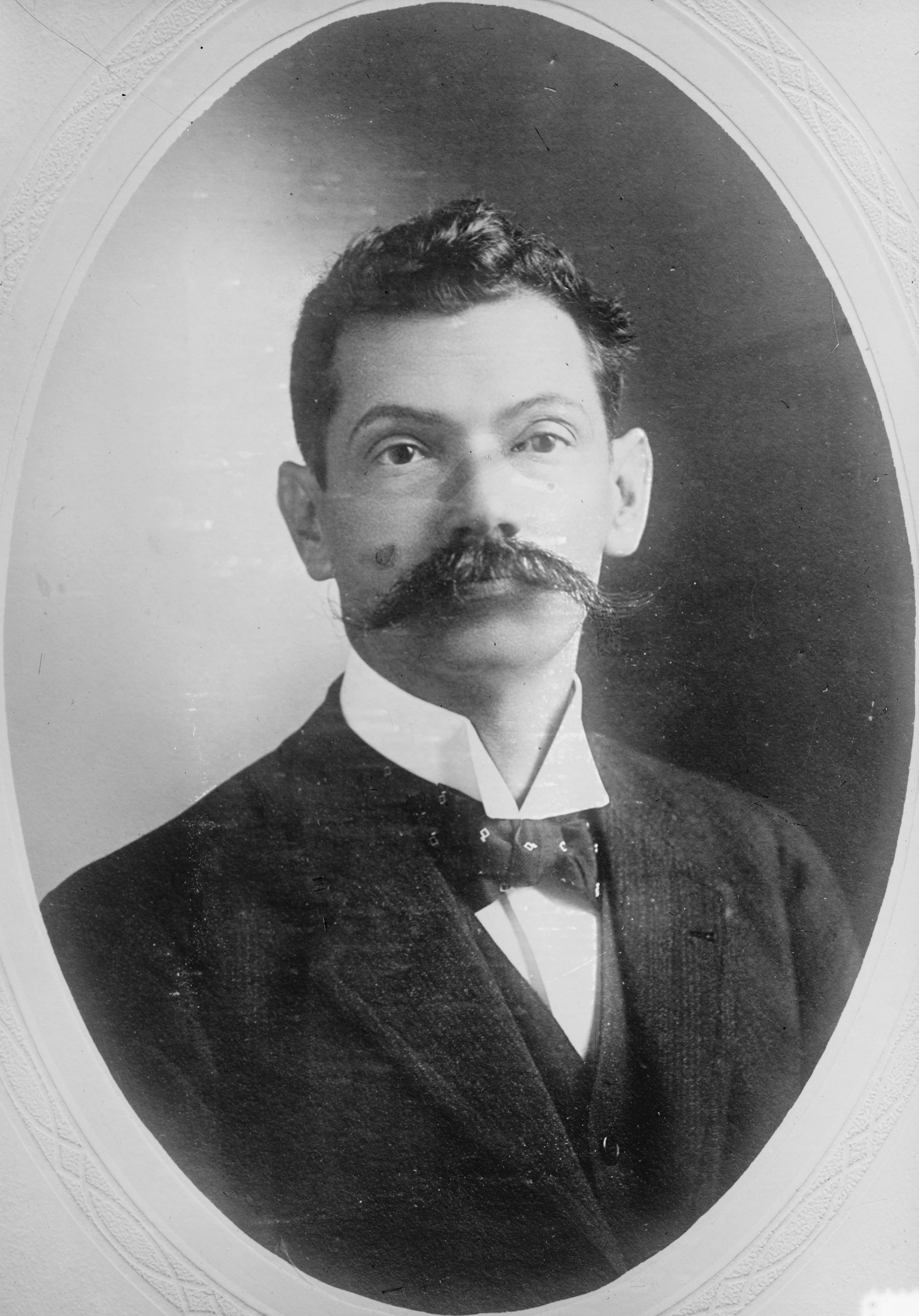
President Francisco Bertrand

The elections of 1912 were won by Manuel Bonilla, but he died after little more than a year in power. Francisco Bertrand, who had been his vice-president, returned to the presidency and in 1916 won the election for a term that lasted until 1920. The Bertrand government represented mostly the American interests on the national level, accepted the mediation of United States in the resolution of the border conflict with Guatemala and also in the back conflict by two regions adjoining with Nicaragua (The trojes and Potrerillos). In his second term, from 1916 to 1919, try to launch as an official candidate of the party to his coined Nazario Soriano which caused a civil war headed by General Rafael López Gutiérrez, candidate of the opposition, and General Vicente Tosta Carrasco. The American ambassador took part so that Bertrand lost power and left the country.

From 1920 to 1923, there were seventeen uprisings or attempted coups d'état in Honduras. This contributed even more to the already increasing worry of the United States about the political unsteadiness in Central America. In August 1922, the presidents of Honduras, Nicaragua, and El Salvador gathered on the USS Tacoma in the Gulf of Fonseca, under the attentive eye of the ambassadors of the United States to these countries. The presidents promised once again to prevent that their territories were used to promote revolutions against their neighbors. Likewise, it did them a called to all the countries, to gather in Washington at the end of the year. Apart from all this, in September 1920 the first national strike, the workers of the company "Vaccaro Brother Company" with headquarters in La Ceiba in the department of Atlántida organized to demand adjustment of wages.

The Washington conference concluded in February with the approval of the General Treaty of Peace and Friendship of 1923. This treaty reorganized the Central American Court and ratified a lot of dispositions from the treaty of 1907. The clause of non-recognition of revolutionary governments was extended; Likewise, the rulers engaged once again not to intervene in the affairs of their neighbors.

This same meeting promoted agriculture and free trade. It limited arms and established a limit on the size of the military strengths of each country (2500 men for Honduras). The United States engaged to look for foreign help for the professionalization of the armed forces.

=== Elections and American intervention ===
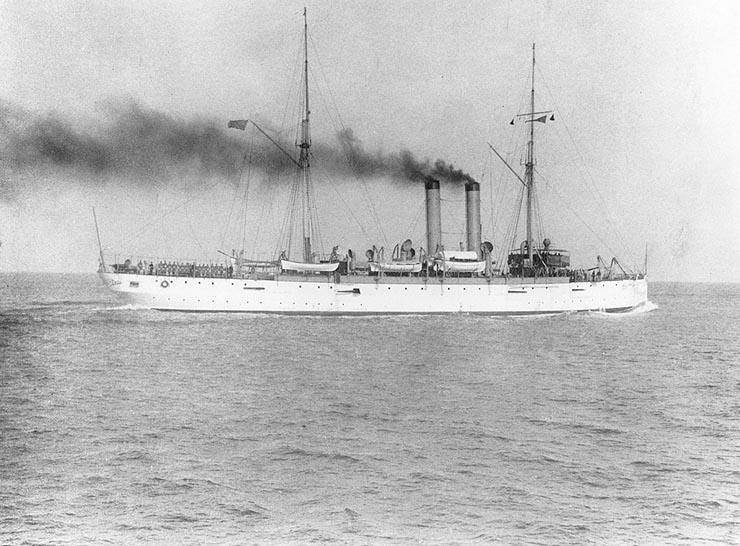
USS Denver

Presidential elections in Honduras in October 1923 and subsequent political and military conflicts provided the first challenges for these new agreements. Under strong pressure from Washington, López Gutiérrez allowed free elections. The very fragmented conservatives united under the flag of the National Party of Honduras (PNH). These chose the governor of Cortés, Tiburcio Carías Andino as their candidate. Whereas the liberal party (PLH) was divided into two currents: one supported ex-president Policarpo Bonilla, and others the candidacy of Juan Ángel Arias Boquín. When carrying out the elections, Carías received the most votes (49,953). Bonilla (35,474 votes) was second and Arias (20,839 votes) remained in a distant third place. But nobody got the majority required by the Constitution of Honduras. Then it fell to Congress to convene and take a decision. But the members did not reach an agreement.

In January 1924, López Gutiérrez announced his intention to remain in charge until new elections could be held, but never gave a specific date. Facing this situation, Tiburcio Carías Andino, apparently with the support of the United Fruit Company, proclaimed himself president, and a new armed conflict burst. In February the government of the United States warned that any person getting power by revolutionary means would not be recognized. At the same time, it suspended relations with López Gutiérrez for not carrying out the elections.

Conditions deteriorated quickly in the first months of 1924. On 28 February, a battle took place in La Ceiba between government troops and the rebels. Even the presence of the S.S. Denver and the landing of a force of U.S. marines was unable to prevent looting and arson that made more than US$2 million in property damage. Fifty people, among them a US citizen, died in the fighting. In the following weeks, additional ships of the United States Navy concentrated in Honduran waters, to protect American interests.

=== General Vicente Tosta ===
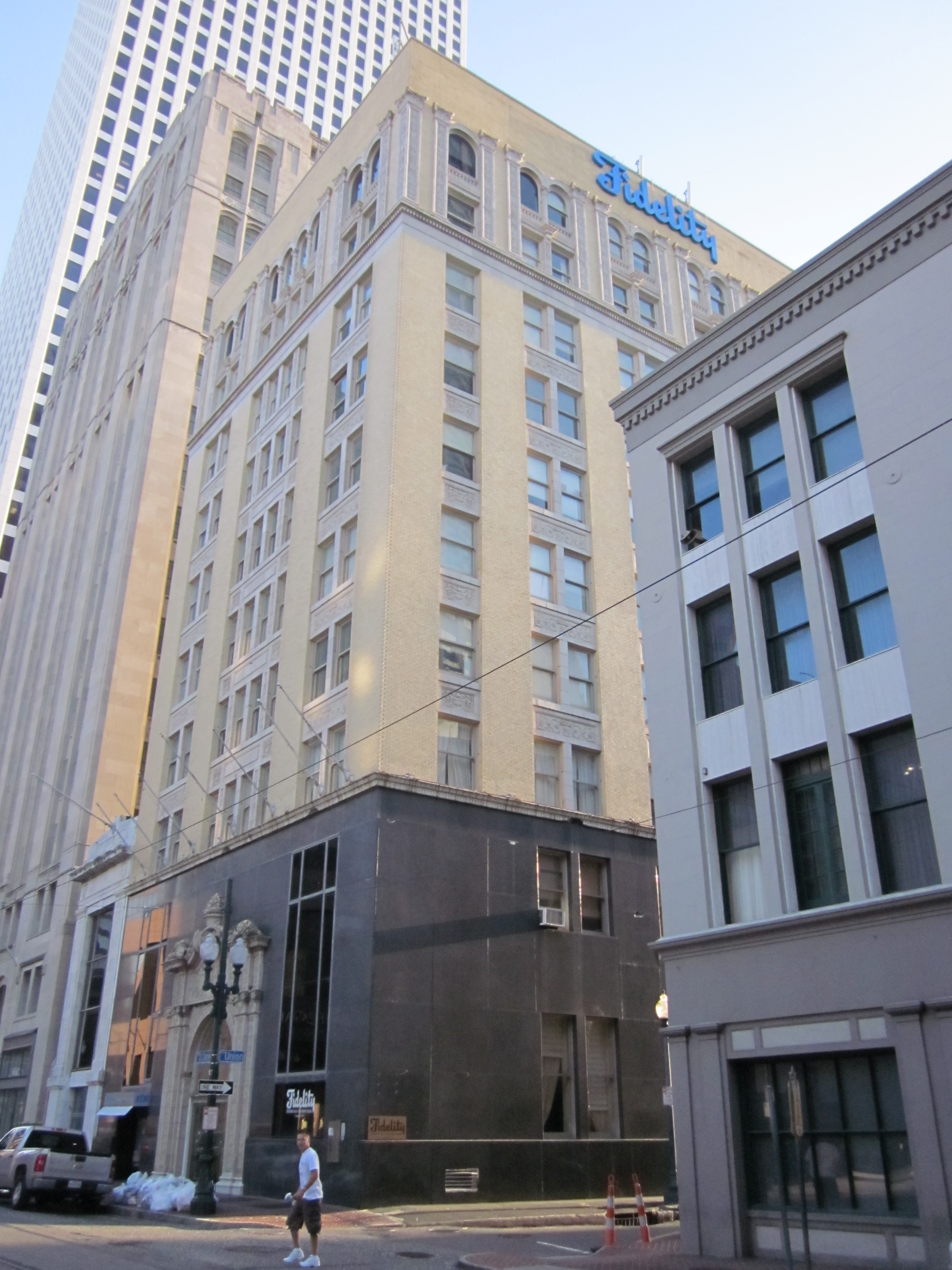
Former building of the United Fruit Co.

A marine force and sailors were sent all the way to the interior to Tegucigalpa to offer additional protection to the delegation of the United States. Shortly before their arrival, Rafael López Gutiérrez died, and control of the country fell to the cabinet. General Carías and other rebel leaders controlled the greater part of the battlefield, but did not coordinate their activities with sufficient efficiency to seize the capital.

In an effort to put an end to the fighting, the government of the United States sent Sumner Welles to the port of Amapala. Welles had instructions to produce a satisfactory agreement according to the treaty of 1923, and convey power to somebody that could be recognized legally. The negotiations once again held onboard the USS Milwaukee, lasted from 23 to 28 April. In the end, they came to the agreement to set up a provisional government headed by the general Vicente Tosta Carrasco, who agreed to appoint a cabinet representing all the political factions and to summon a Constituent Assembly within ninety days in order to restore constitutional order. The constitution of 1924 was promulgated during the reign of this government.

The presidential elections had to be held as soon as possible. Tosta himself promised to refrain from running. Once in office, Tosta showed signs of not wanting to fulfill some of his promises. But under strong pressure from the US delegation, he had to comply in the end with the provisions of the peace agreement.

Keeping the elections to a clear-cut date proved to be a difficult task. To exert pressure on Tosta, the United States set an arms embargo on Honduras and forbade the government to give him access to the credit - that included a loan of US$75.000 from the Bank Atlántida S.A. Also, the United States convinced El Salvador, Guatemala, and Nicaragua to keep the treaty of 1923 and not to recognize any revolutionary leader as president.

These pressures finally helped persuade Carías to withdraw his candidacy. It also helped to ensure the defeat of an uprising headed by the General Gregorio Ferrera of the PNH.

== Restoration of order (1925–31) ==
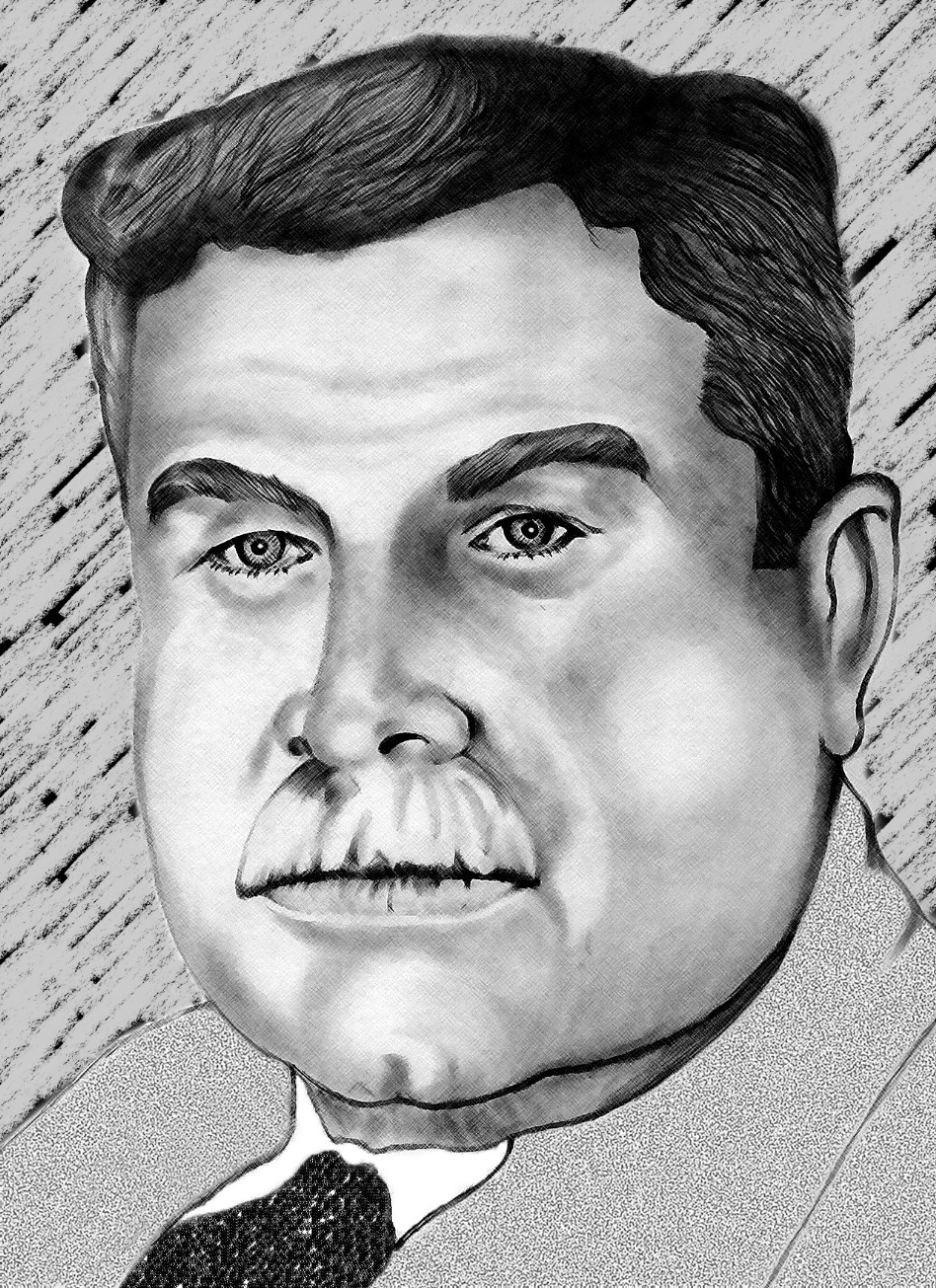
General Tiburcio Carias Andino.

Despite another minor uprising led by General Ferrera in 1925, Paz Barahona's administration was, by Honduran standards, rather tranquil. The banana companies continued to expand, the government's budgetary situation improved, and there was even an increase in labor organizing. On the international front, the Honduran government, after years of negotiations, finally concluded an agreement with the British bondholders to liquidate most of the immense national debt. The bonds were to be redeemed at 20 percent of face value over a thirty-year period. Back interest was forgiven, and new interest accrued only over the last fifteen years of this arrangement. Under the terms of this agreement, Honduras, at last, seemed on the road to fiscal solvency.

Fears of disturbances increased again in 1928 as the scheduled presidential elections approached. The ruling PNH nominated General Carías while the PLH, united again following the death of Policarpo Bonilla in 1926, nominated Vicente Mejía Colindres. To the surprise of most observers, both the campaign and the election were conducted with a minimum of violence and intimidation. Mejía Colindres won a decisive victory—obtaining 62,000 votes to 47,000 for Carías. Even more surprising was Carías's public acceptance of defeat and his urging of his supporters to accept the new government.

Mejía Colindres took office in 1929 with high hopes for his administration and his nation. Honduras seemed on the road to political and economic progress. Banana exports, then accounting for 80 percent of all exports, continued to expand. By 1930 Honduras had become the world's leading producer of the fruit, accounting for one-third of the world's supply of bananas. United Fruit had come increasingly to dominate the trade, and in 1929 it bought out the Cuyamel Fruit Company, one of its two principal remaining rivals. Because conflicts between these companies had frequently led to support for rival groups in Honduran politics, had produced a border controversy with Guatemala, and may have even contributed to revolutionary disturbances, this merger seemed to promise greater domestic tranquility. The prospect for tranquility was further advanced in 1931 when Ferrera was killed while leading one last unsuccessful effort to overthrow the government.

Many of Mejía Colindres's hopes, however, were dashed with the onset of the Great Depression. Banana exports peaked in 1930, then declined rapidly. Thousands of workers were laid off, and the wages of those remaining on the job were reduced, as were the prices paid to independent banana producers by the giant fruit companies. Strikes and other labor disturbances began to break out in response to these conditions, but most were quickly suppressed with the aid of government troops. As the depression deepened, the government's financial situation deteriorated; in 1931 Mejía Colindres was forced to borrow US$250,000 from the fruit companies to ensure that the army would continue to be paid.

=== Miguel Paz Barahona ===
The National Party (PNH) nominated Miguel Paz Barahona to the presidency. The PLH, after some debate, declined to appoint a candidate, and on 28 December Paz Barahona won the election unanimously. He assumed power on 1 February 1925.

While in office, he undertook to guarantee the return of exiled politicians and to cancel the debt with England (Alcerro King agreement). He also supported granting family plots to the peasant sector. He also promoted public education, for which he used prisons and barracks. Nevertheless, the alliance with US interests remained intact. His government persecuted journalists and citizens opposed to the United States. In spite of a new minor uprising led by the general Ferrera in 1925, the administration of Paz Barahona was relatively calm.

Moreover, in March 1925 the workers of the Wit Azucarero in the municipality of La Lima, in the department of Cortés began to take to the streets, followed by other workers from the North coast and seconded by the employees of the "Cuyamel Fruit Company". The workers requested: weekly payments, working days of 8 hours, and increases of wage.

In 1928 fears of new riots returned, as the end of the mandate of Paz Barahona approached. The PNH designated Tiburcio Carías as its presidential candidate, whereas the PLH appointed Vicente Mejía Colindres, after the death of Dr. Polycarp Bonilla. To the surprise of many observers, the electoral campaign, as well as the elections, were carried out with minimal acts of violence and intimidation.

=== Vicente Mejía Colindres ===
Mejía Colindres obtained a decisive victory, winning 62,000 of the votes compared to the 47,000 gained by Carías. The most surprising part of this election was Carías' public acceptance of his defeat as well as his insistence that his followers should accept the new government. Mejía Colindres took power in 1929 with big hopes for his administration and his nation. Honduras seemed to be on the way to political and economic progress. Banana exports at that time constituted 90% of all exports. In 1930, Honduras had become the primary producer of bananas in the world.

United Fruit had managed to increasingly dominate trade, and in 1929 bought out the Cuyamel Fruit Company, one of its two main rivals. With the merger of these two companies, a bit more tranquility was expected, since the rivalry of the two had contributed significantly to the revolutionary riots.

More of this tranquility was expected in 1931, after General Ferrera was killed in a final attempt to overthrow the government.

Many of the hopes of Mejía Colindres, however, were dispelled with the beginning of the Great Depression. Banana exports peaked in 1930 but afterward diminished quickly. Thousands of workers were sacked, and the wages of those who remained were reduced, just as the prices paid to the independent banana producers by the giant banana companies. As the depression sharpened, the financial situation of the government deteriorated, and in 1931 Colindres Mejía was forced to borrow $250,000 from the fruit companies to ensure the army payroll.
