= 1894 Honduran presidential election =

Presidential elections were held in Honduras in December 1894. Policarpo Bonilla was elected with over 98% of the vote.

== Background ==
Domingo Vásquez had been elected president in September 1893. However, in December, forces led by Liberal Party founder Policarpo Bonilla invaded from Nicaragua with support from Nicaraguan president José Santos Zelaya. Bonilla set up a new government in Los Amates on 24 December, which was recognised by Zelaya the following day. Following a siege of several weeks, Bonilla's forces took the capital Tegucigalpa on 22 February 1894 and he was appointed president.

In April Bonilla called Constituent Assembly elections, which were held in June. The newly elected Assembly met on 1 July and drafted a new constitution. Although women's suffrage was supported by three deputies, it did not appear in the final constitution. The new constitution was promulgated on 14 October. It prohibited presidents from seeking re-election and provided for the direct election of Supreme Court judges.

== Results ==
=== President ===
Candidate	Party	Votes	%
Policarpo Bonilla	Liberal Party	42,667	98.84
Other candidates		499	1.16
Total		43,166	100.00
Source: Durón

=== Vice President ===
Candidate	Votes	%
Manuel Bonilla	40,621	94.40
Other candidates	2,411	5.60
Total	43,032	100.00
Source: Durón
