= 1893 Honduran presidential election =

Presidential elections were held in Honduras on 14 September 1893. Domingo Vásquez was the only candidate and was elected unopposed.

== Background ==
On 9 February 1893 President Ponciano Leiva, who had been elected in 1891, announced he was stepping down and handed power to Minister of War Rosendo Agüero. Agüero subsequently delegated his power to Domingo Vásquez. Leiva formally resigned on 15 July, although he remained president until 7 August.

== Results ==
Candidate	Votes	%
Domingo Vásquez	37,141	94.93
Against	1,983	5.07
Total	39,124	100.00
Source: The Library, UC San Diego
