= 1891 Honduran presidential election =

Presidential elections were held in Honduras between 4 and 6 September 1891. The result was a victory for Ponciano Leiva of the Progressive Party.

== Background ==
The Liberal Party was established by Policarpo Bonilla in January 1891 in order to oppose president Luis Bográn. At its founding congress, Bonilla was selected as the party's presidential candidate. Bográn subsequently founded the National Party later in January, which consisted of moderate liberals and supporters of former president José María Medina. However, he did not run for re-election. In February the Progressive Party was established, with Ponciano Leiva as its presidential candidate.

During the campaign, Bonilla called for the granting of women's suffrage. However, his campaign was disrupted by the government invoking emergency powers on the pretext of an uprising.

== Results ==
Candidate	Party	Votes	%
Ponciano Leiva	Progressive Party	34,362	69.19
Policarpo Bonilla	Liberal Party	15,300	30.81
Total		49,662	100.00
Source: UCSD

== Aftermath ==
Leiva took office in November after being confirmed by Congress.
