= 1898 Honduran general election =

General elections were held in Honduras between 30 October and 1 November 1898. Terencio Sierra was elected president with 83% of the vote, marking the first peaceful transfer of power for several decades.

== Background ==
In January 1898 president Policarpo Bonilla convened a group that met at the Palace of Tegucigalpa to select candidates to contest the forthcoming elections. Terencio Sierra was chosen as the presidential candidate and José María Reina as the vice presidential candidate. They were the only candidates to contest the elections.

== Results ==
=== President ===
| Candidate | Party | Votes | % |
|---|---|---|---|
| Terencio Sierra | Liberal Party | 36,756 | 82.53 |
| Against | | 7,781 | 17.47 |
| Total | | 44,537 | 100.00 |
Source: Durón

=== Vice president ===
| Candidate | Votes | % |
|---|---|---|
| José María Reina | 37,546 | 84.55 |
| Against | 6,862 | 15.45 |
| Total | 44,408 | 100.00 |
Source: The Library, UC San Diego
