= Francisco Zelaya y Ayes =

Honduran politician

José Francisco Zelaya y Ayes
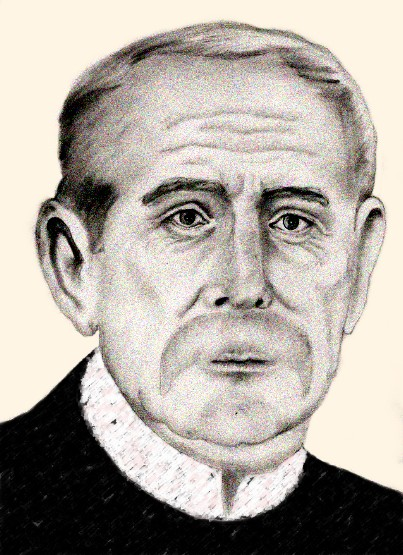

President of Honduras
- In office 21 September 1839 – 1 January 1841
- Vice President: Francisco Alvarado
- Preceded by: Council of Ministers
- Succeeded by: Francisco Ferrera

Personal details
- Born: 1798 Juticalpa, Olancho
- Died: October 20, 1848 Comayagua, Honduras

General José Francisco Zelaya y Ayes (1798 – 1848) was the first Constitutional President of Honduras in the period from 21 September 1839 to 1 January 1841.

He assumed office on September 21, 1839, in the city of Juticalpa as the seat of the Executive after the resignation of José María Bustillo and the Council of Ministers made up of Mónico Bueso and Francisco de Aguilar convened a session of the Legislative Assembly of Honduras in which he was elected. Since he was not in the city of Comayagua, the Assembly entrusted the task to the members of the Council of Ministers to travel with the decree that named him as president to the city of Juticalpa to deliver it to him.

Barely four days after taking office, on September 25, 1839, General Francisco Morazán defeated the troops of General Francisco Ferrera in San Pedro Perulapán. He was informed of this situation by General Nicolás Espinoza in his capacity as Chief of Staff of Honduras. Along with this, the troops commanded by General José Trinidad Cabañas take the city of Tegucigalpa and continue on their way to Choluteca to regroup in Nacaome and return to El Salvador, so on November 13, 1839, he is defeated by the forces of José Trinidad Cabañas in the Battle of El Sitio de la Soledad.

== See also ==
- List of presidents of Honduras
