= Policarpo Bonilla =

Honduran politician

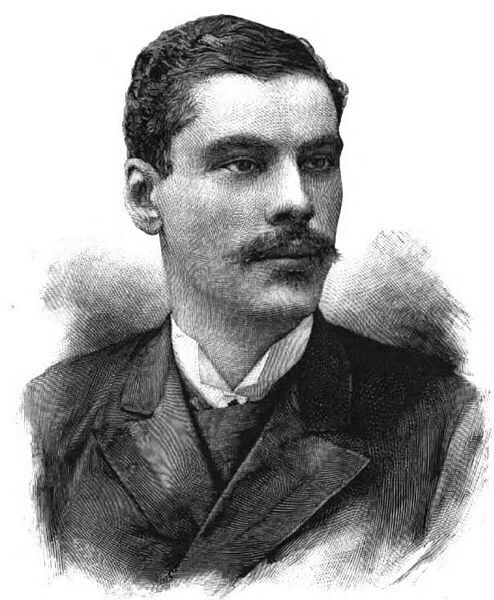

President of Honduras
- In office 1 February 1895 – 1 February 1899
- Vice President: Manuel Bonilla
- Preceded by: Domingo Vásquez
- Succeeded by: Terencio Sierra

Dictator of Honduras
- In office 22 February 1894 – 1 February 1895

Personal details
- Born: 17 March 1858 Tegucigalpa
- Died: 11 September 1926 (aged 68) New Orleans, Louisiana, US
- Party: Liberal Party of Honduras

José Policarpo Bonilla Vasquez (17 March 1858 – 11 September 1926) was Dictator of Honduras between 22 February 1894 and 1 February 1895. He was then elected as President for the period between 1 February 1895 and 1 February 1899.

== Biography ==
He was born on 17 March 1858 in Tegucigalpa, Honduras; his parents were Inocencio Bonilla and Juana Vasquez. He became a lawyer on 17 March 1878, and held posts in the government of Marco Aurelio Soto. On 31 October 1890 he created a newspaper "El Bien Público".

In February 1891 he founded the Liberal Party of Honduras. In November 1891 Bonilla contested the presidential elections, but lost to Ponciano Leiva. In December 1893 he led armed forces that invaded from Nicaragua with support from Nicaraguan president José Santos Zelaya. He set up a new government in Los Amates on 24 December, which was recognised by Zelaya the following day. Following a siege of several weeks, Bonilla's forces took the capital Tegucigalpa on 22 February 1894 and he was appointed president.

In April Bonilla called Constituent Assembly elections for June. The Assembly met on 1 July and drafted a new constitution. Although women's suffrage was supported by three deputies, it did not appear in the final constitution. The new constitution was promulgated on 14 October. It prohibited presidents from seeking re-election and provided for the direct election of Supreme Court judges. In the subsequent presidential elections in December, he was elected president with over 98% of the vote. He served until the constitutional end of his term and was succeeded by Terencio Sierra, who won the 1898 elections.

He later became a deputy in the National Congress, and was also the governor of Tegucigalpa. He was described as "the hero who, by transforming Honduras, gave it a new conscience" by Rafael Heliodoro Valle. In 1919 he was the delegate for Honduras to the Peace Conference of Versailles.

Bonilla, who had divided the Liberal Party when he ran for president in the 1924, died in 1926. Following his death, the Liberal Party was reunited and nominated Vicente Mejía Colindres. Conlindres won the 1928 elections.

== Sources ==
Political offices
Preceded by Domingo Vásquez	President of Honduras; 1895–1899	Succeeded by Terencio Sierra
