= Luis Bográn =

Honduran politician

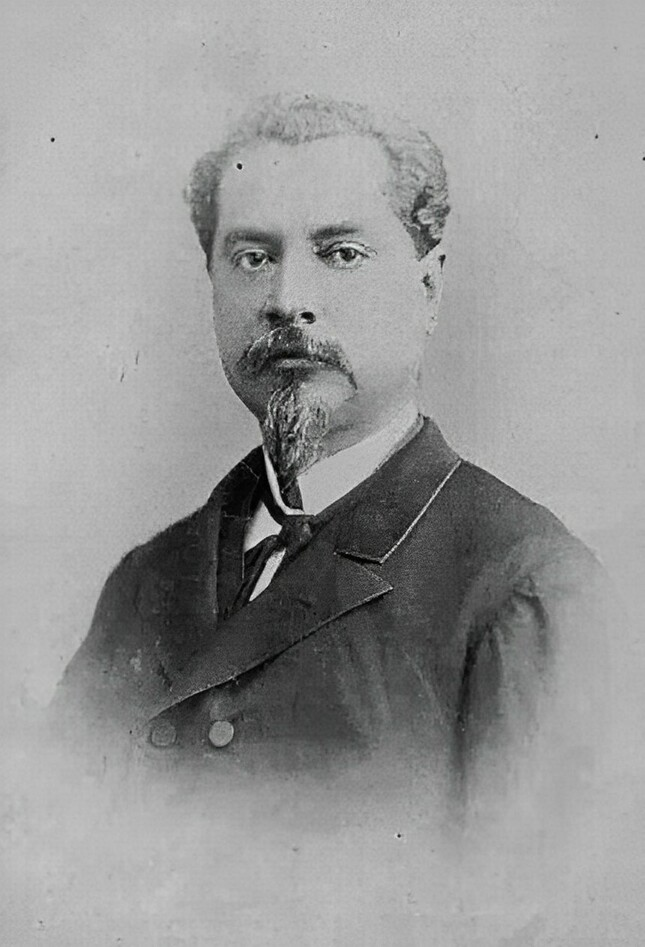

Head of state of Honduras
- In office 30 November 1883 – 30 November 1891
- Preceded by: Marco Aurelio Soto
- Succeeded by: Ponciano Leiva

Personal details
- Born: 3 June 1849 Santa Bárbara, Honduras
- Died: 9 July 1895 (aged 46) Guatemala City, Guatemala
- Party: Partido Progresista
- Spouse: Teresa Morejon Ferrera
- Occupation: Politician, Military

Luis Bográn Barahona (3 June 1849 – 9 July 1895) was a president of Honduras, who served two consecutive terms from 30 November 1883 to 30 November 1891. He was born in the northern Honduran department of Santa Bárbara on 3 June 1849 to Saturnino Bográn Bonilla and Gertrudis Barahona Leiva. He was a member of a prominent and wealthy political family. The last name "Bográn" derives from the French surname "Beaugrand". Luis Bográn was the brother of future president Francisco Bográn (5 October 1919 – 1 February 1920) and first cousin of future president Miguel Paz Barahona (1 February 1925 – 1 February 1929).

== Background ==
After successfully completing his secondary school studies in his home town, Bográn pursued a law degree at the University of San Carlos in Guatemala, and later pursued a career in the military. Bográn reached the rank of general within a few years, after successful military campaigns against Salvadoran military adversaries attempting to infiltrate national territory. He married Teresa Morejon Ferrera in 1878. Soon after, he became involved in politics, and later became ex-president Marco Aurelio Soto's protégé.

=== Politics ===
Bográn's two consecutive terms as president were considered to be very prosperous for the nation. He is known for greatly expanding the educational system by establishing a number of learning institutions around the country, attracting considerable foreign investment (especially into the agricultural sector), improving the infrastructure of the capital city, and encouraging research and investigation of the ancient Mayan city of Copán. As a strong supporter of Francisco Morazán's ideal, President Bográn was a unionist and attempted to bring about, with the help of then-Guatemalan President Justo Rufino Barrios, the unification of the five Central American states. Ultimately, the unionist agenda was defeated as the ultra-conservative power elites in these states successfully thwarted unification attempts.

Bográn died in Guatemala city, Guatemala, on 9 July 1895.

== As president of Honduras ==
Bográn is renowned in Honduras for greatly expanding the educational system throughout the major cities and towns of Honduras. He founded the Escuela de Artes y Oficios (National School of Arts), the Academia Científico-Literario (Literary-Scientific Academy), and the Tipografia Nacional (National Typography/Press). He also attracted substantial foreign investment, especially into the agricultural arena, which resulted in job creation and economic development of the northern coast. He improved the infrastructure of the capital city, Tegucigalpa. Bográn also initiated the process of research and investigation in the ruins of the ancient Mayan city of Copan by inviting foreign universities to study the artifacts and architecture left behind by the Mayans. He was also one of the founding members of the Partido Nacional de Honduras, PNH (National Party of Honduras).

He was considered pro-American. The Bográn administration sided with foreign mining companies against laborers.

Political offices
Preceded by Marco Aurelio Soto	President of Honduras; 1883–1891	Succeeded by Ponciano Leiva
