= Terencio Sierra =

President of Honduras (1839–1907)

Terencio Esteban Sierra Romero
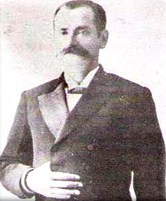

President of Honduras
- In office 1 February 1899 – 1 February 1903
- Vice President: José María Reina
- Preceded by: Policarpo Bonilla
- Succeeded by: Juan Ángel Arias Boquín

Personal details
- Born: 16 November 1839 Comayagua
- Died: 25 October 1907 (aged 67)
- Party: Liberal Party of Honduras

Terencio Esteban Sierra Romero (16 November 1839 – 25 October 1907) was President of Honduras between 1 February 1899 and 1 February 1903.

Sierra was born in Coray, Valle, Honduras. After studying in Comayagua, he became a typographist in El Salvador before travelling through Central and South America as an accountant in the shipping industry. He was a democratically elected president and his vice-president was General Jose Maria Reina Bustillo, co-founder of the Liberal Party.

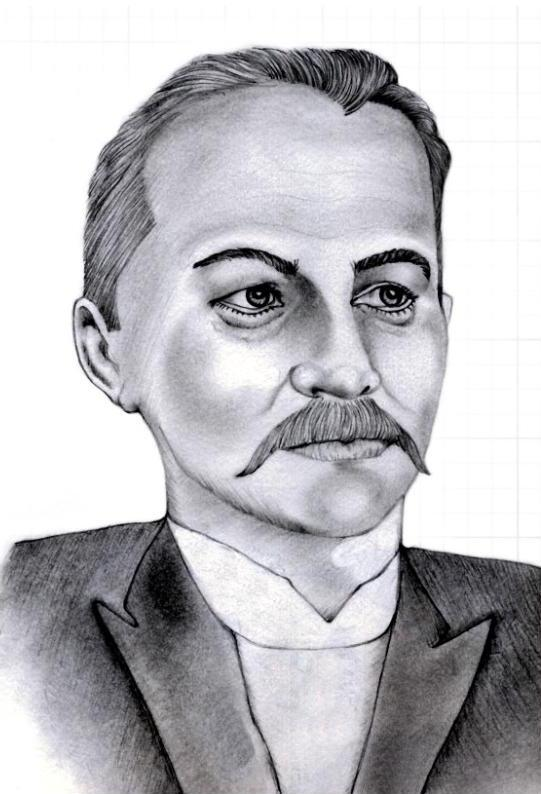
Drawing of Terencio Sierra

Sierra's attempt to stay in office after the 1902 elections resulted in his overthrow by General Manuel Bonilla and exile to Nicaragua. He died there in 1907.

== See also ==
- List of presidents of Honduras

Political offices
Preceded by Policarpo Bonilla	President of Honduras; 1899–1903	Succeeded by Juan Ángel Arias
