= Domingo Vásquez =

President of Honduras (1846–1909)

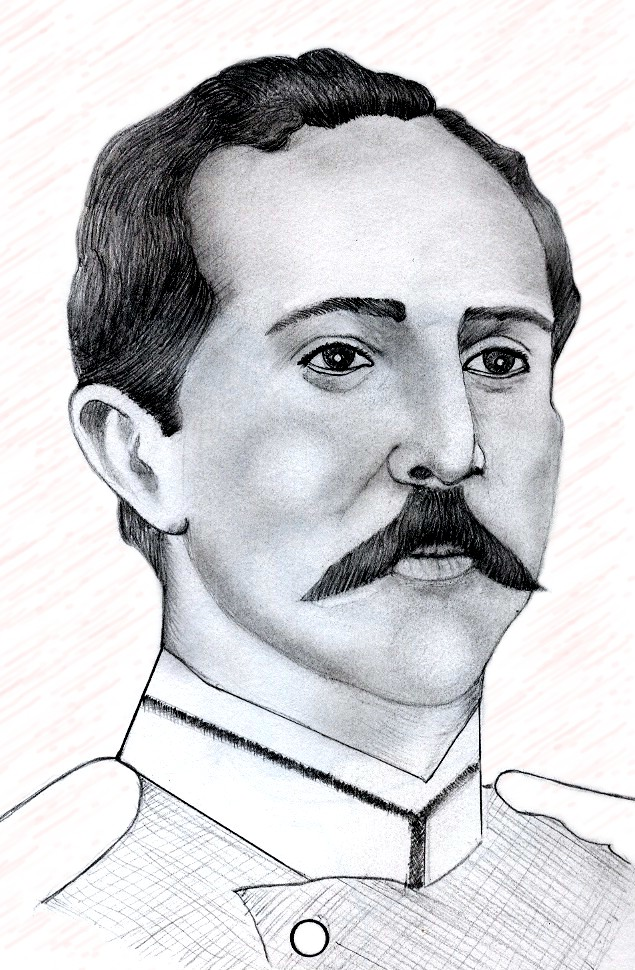
Domingo Vásquez

José Domingo Vásquez Toruño (August 3, 1846 – December 11, 1909) was President of Honduras 7 August 1893 – 22 February 1894. He lost power as a result of Honduras being defeated in a war with Nicaragua and was replaced by Policarpo Bonilla.

Political offices
Preceded by Ponciano Leiva	President of Honduras; 1893–1894	Succeeded by Policarpo Bonilla
