= Ponciano Leiva =

President of Honduras (1821–1896)

Ponciano Leiva Madrid
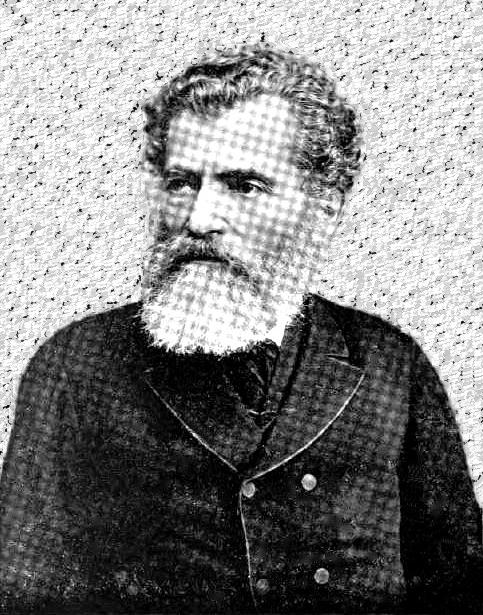
- Engraving of Leiva, 1891

President of Honduras
- In office 30 November 1891 – 7 August 1893
- Vice President: Rosendo Agüero Ariza
- Preceded by: Luis Bográn
- Succeeded by: Domingo Vásquez

Personal details
- Born: November 19, 1821 Ceguaca
- Died: December 12, 1896 (aged 75)
- Party: Liberal Party of Honduras

Ponciano Leiva Madrid (November 19, 1821 – December 12, 1896) was President of Honduras 13 January 1874 – 8 June 1876 and 30 November 1891 – 7 August 1893. Leiva was a conservative.

Leiva was a soldier and initially came to power through the support of the military. He rose to the rank of general.

Leiva initially came to power by overthrowing his predecessor in a coup. In 1876 he left office due to pressure from Justo Rufino Barrios, the president of Guatemala.

He later served as minister of war to Luis Bográn, and then was elected to the presidency in 1891. In this election held on 10 November 1891 Leiva received the majority of the vote. His main opponent in the election was Policarpo Bonilla. In 1893 Leiva resigned from office due to the threat of revolution and was replaced by Domingo Vásquez.

== See also ==
- List of presidents of Honduras

Political offices
Preceded by Céleo Arias (provisional)	President of Honduras; 1874–1876	Succeeded by Marcelino Mejía (provisional)
Preceded by Luis Bográn	President of Honduras; 1891–1893	Succeeded by Domingo Vásquez
