= President of Honduras =

Head of state and government

President of the Republic of Honduras
- Presidente de la República de Honduras
- Coat of arms of Honduras

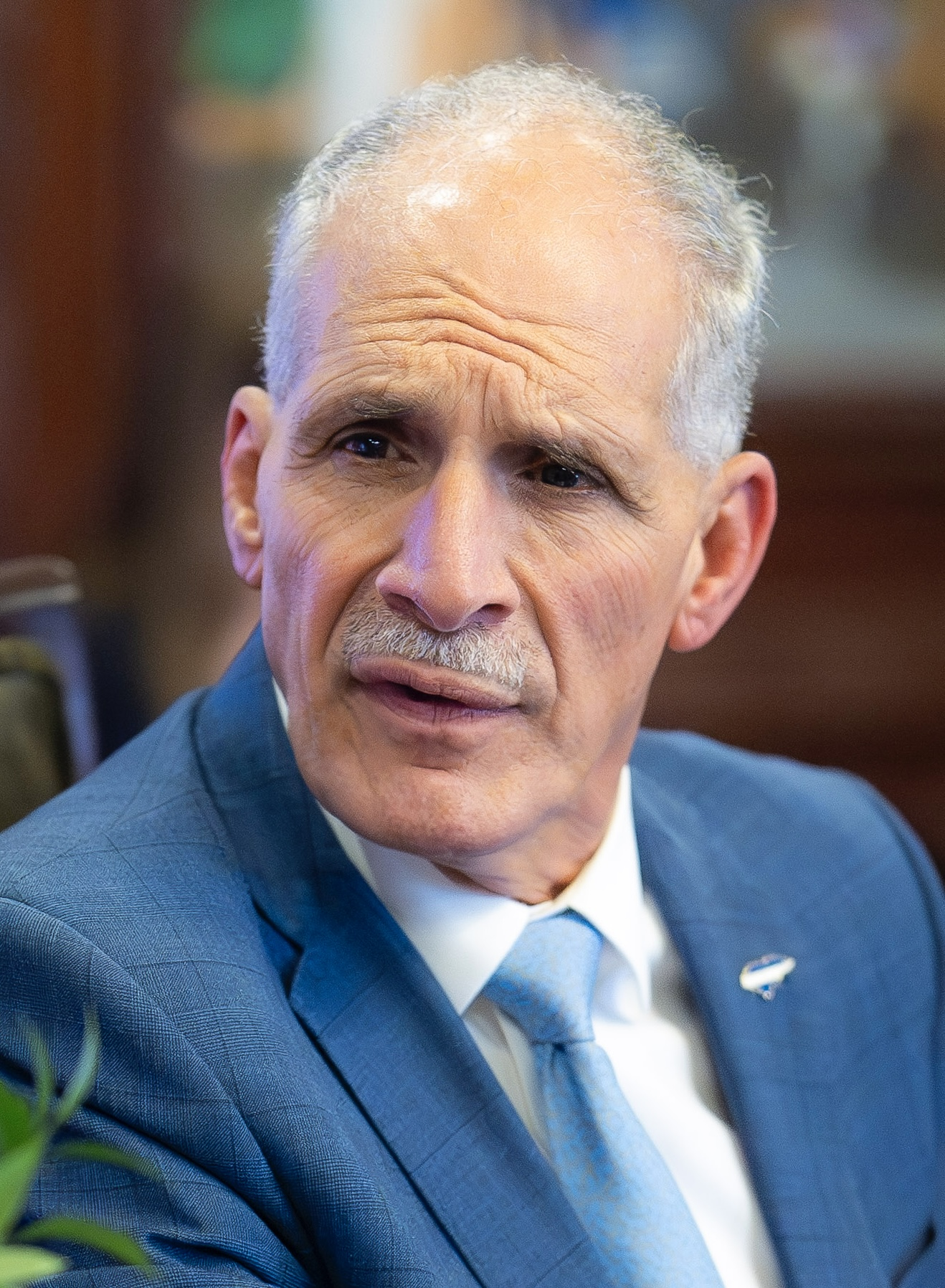
- Incumbent; Nasry Asfura since 27 January 2026
- Style: Mr./Madam President (Señor/a Presidente/a) (informal); The Most Excellent (Excelentísimo/a Señor/a) (diplomatic)
- Type: Head of state Head of government
- Residence: Palacio José Cecilio del Valle
- Term length: Four years, non renewable
- Constituting instrument: Constitution of Honduras (1982)
- Inaugural holder: José Francisco Zelaya y Ayes
- Formation: September 16, 1824 (202 years ago) (first); 27 January 1982 (current)
- Deputy: Vice President of Honduras
- Salary: L 102,560 / US$4,159 monthly
- Website: presidencia.gob.hn

The president of Honduras (Spanish: Presidente de Honduras), officially known as the president of the Republic of Honduras (Spanish: Presidente de la República de Honduras), is the head of state and head of government of Honduras, and the commander-in-chief of the Armed Forces. According to the 1982 Constitution of Honduras, the Government of Honduras consists of three branches: executive, legislative and judicial. The president is the head of the executive branch, their primary duty being to "execute and enforce the Constitution, treaties and conventions, laws and other legal dispositions". The President is directly elected for a four-year term.

== Eligibility ==
Qualifications are extremely stringent, designed to prevent a dictatorship by political, military, or business figures. To be eligible to run for president, the candidate is required to:

- Be a natural-born Honduran.
- Be more than 30 years old at the time of the election.
- Enjoy the full rights of Honduran citizenship.
- Not be an official of any church or religious denomination.
- Not be in active military service during the six months prior to the election.
- Not be a presidential appointee, secretary or under-secretary of state, judge, or member of the electoral court, attorney general or deputy attorney, comptroller general or deputy comptroller general, or an executive of a privately held institution for at least six months prior to the election.
- Not be an officer of the armed forces or law enforcement or an active soldier therein for at least 12 months prior to the election.
- Not be the spouse or relative of the incumbent president, any military leader, or any presidential appointee who has held the presidency also in the year prior to the election.

== Powers ==
The Constitution ascribes 45 specific rights and powers to the office of the presidency:

- To execute and enforce the Constitution, treaties and conventions, laws and other legal dispositions.
- To direct the general policy of the State and represent it.
- To maintain the independence, honor, integrity, and inviolability of Honduras.
- To maintain the peace and security of the Republic and repel any attack or foreign aggression.
- To freely appoint and remove the secretaries of their cabinet, and other posts whose appointments are not assigned to other officials.
- To call the National Congress into special session, or propose an extension of the ordinary session.
- To restrict or suspend the exercise of rights of the Council of Ministers, subject to the provisions of this Constitution.
- To address the National Congress at any time, and to adjourn each ordinary legislative session.
- To participate in the introduction of legislation to Congress by the cabinet secretaries.
- To provide implement the resolutions of the legislature, judiciary, and National Electoral Court.
- To issue decrees, regulations, and resolutions pursuant to law.
- To direct foreign policy.
- To conclude treaties and conventions, to be ratified by Congress.
- To appoint the heads of diplomatic and consular missions.
- To receive the heads of state, and diplomatic representatives.
- To be commander-in-chief of the Armed Forces, with the field rank of major general.
- To declare war and peace in the event of congressional recess (although the National Congress must be called immediately into session on such occasion).
- To ensure the good official conduct of public officials and employees.
- To manage the Treasury.
- To dictate extraordinary measures on economic and financial matters when required by the national interest, (which must be reported to the National Congress).
- To negotiate international loans, seeking the approval of Congress as required.
- To formulate the National Development Plan, discussed in the cabinet and approved of Congress, and to then direct and implement that plan.
- To regulate tariffs in accordance with law.
- To pardon and commute criminal sentences.
- To confer military and civilian decorations.
- To collect the public revenue and regulate the investments thereof.
- To publish the quarterly Statement of Income and Expenditure of the Public Revenue.
- To organize, direct, guide, and promote public education.
- To maintain and regulate health care of the people of Honduras.
- To conduct economic and financial policy.
- To exercise supervision and control of banking institutions, insurance, and finance through the National Banking and Insurance and appoint the chairpeople and deputy chairpeople of the Banks of the State.
- To dictate and promote the swift implementation of agrarian production and reform.
- To sanction, veto, publish and promulgate laws passed by Congress.
- To direct and support the policy of economic and social integration, both nationally and internationally, aimed at improving the living conditions of the people of Honduras.
- To create, maintain, and eliminate public services.
- To conferring military ranks from lieutenant to captain, inclusive.
- To ensure that the Army is apolitical, professional, and obedient.
- To allow, with the authorization of Congress, the output of Honduran troops to serve in foreign territory.
- The other functions conferred by the Constitution and legislation.

== Latest election ==
Candidate	Party	Votes	%
Nasry Asfura	National Party	1,481,414	40.26
Salvador Nasralla	Liberal Party	1,455,076	39.55
Rixi Moncada	Liberty and Refoundation	706,222	19.20
Nelson Ávila	Innovation and Unity Party	30,028	0.82
Mario Rivera	Christian Democratic Party	6,450	0.18
Total		3,679,190	100.00
Valid votes		3,679,190	96.97
Invalid votes		71,883	1.89
Blank votes		42,931	1.13
Total votes		3,794,004	100.00
Registered voters/turnout		6,522,577	58.17
Source: CNE

== See also ==
- List of presidents of Honduras
- List of governors of Spanish Honduras
- Presidential Palace of Honduras
