= Caxa Real (Honduras) =

Colonial era building in Comayagua

- Casa de la Moneda
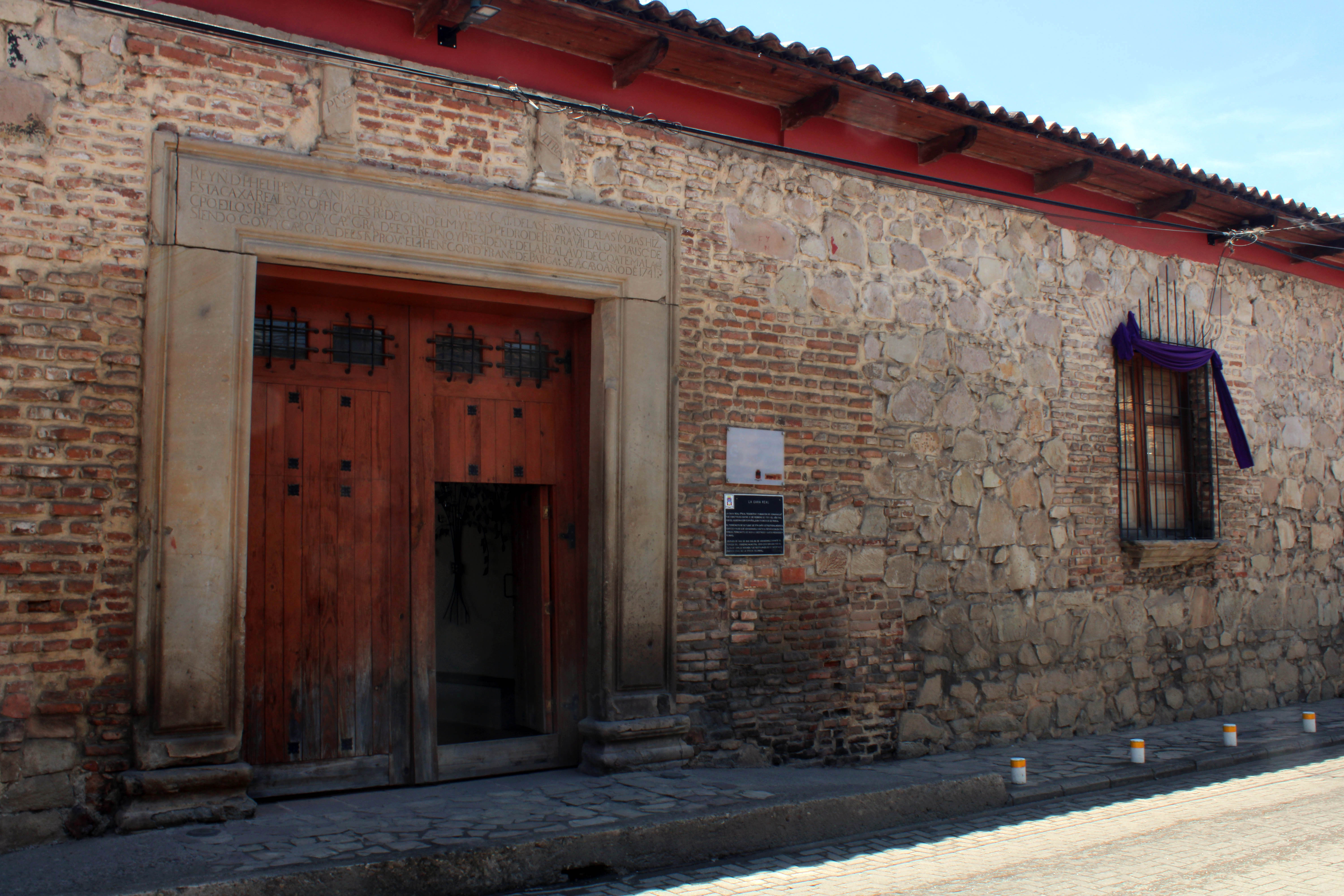
- Part of the original facade of the 18th century building.
- Interactive map of the Caxa Real area

General information
- Status: Open to the public
- Architectural style: Colonial Spanish architecture
- Location: Comayagua, Honduras
- Construction started: 1739
- Completed: 1741
- Destroyed: 1809

Design and construction
- Architect: Baltasar de Maradiaga

The Caxa Real, also known as the "Casa de la Moneda", is an old warehouse in Comayagua, Honduras that served to store all the tributes of the Hibueras (present-day Honduras) for the Spanish crown during the time of New Spain.

In 2013 it was restored with funds from the Spanish Cooperation and was inaugurated by the Spanish ambassador to Honduras Luis Belzuz de los Ríos and the mayor Carlos Miranda Canales. It is declared a national monument and is open to the public. In 2015, the Caxa Real was visited by Queen Letizia of Spain and later, the former president of Mexico, Enrique Peña Nieto.

== History ==
It was built between 1739 and 1741 and designed by the Spanish architect Baltasar de Maradiaga as a center where tributes for the Spanish crown were stored, within it the gold, silver and gypsum extracted from the mines of Honduras were processed, to later be shipped to Europe. On the floor of the building, he introduces some elements that were not in common use in Central American colonial Spanish architecture; It differentiates very well the purely official area, the court room, the Accounting Office, the Treasury, the quicksilver room, the silver room; This sector was entered through a large hallway called by men on horseback and who were on the street that the Río Chiquito rises to the Plaza Mayor.

In 1774 an earthquake managed to significantly damage the structure, however it was repaired after a few months, although it has left the house weaker.

=== 19th and 20th century ===
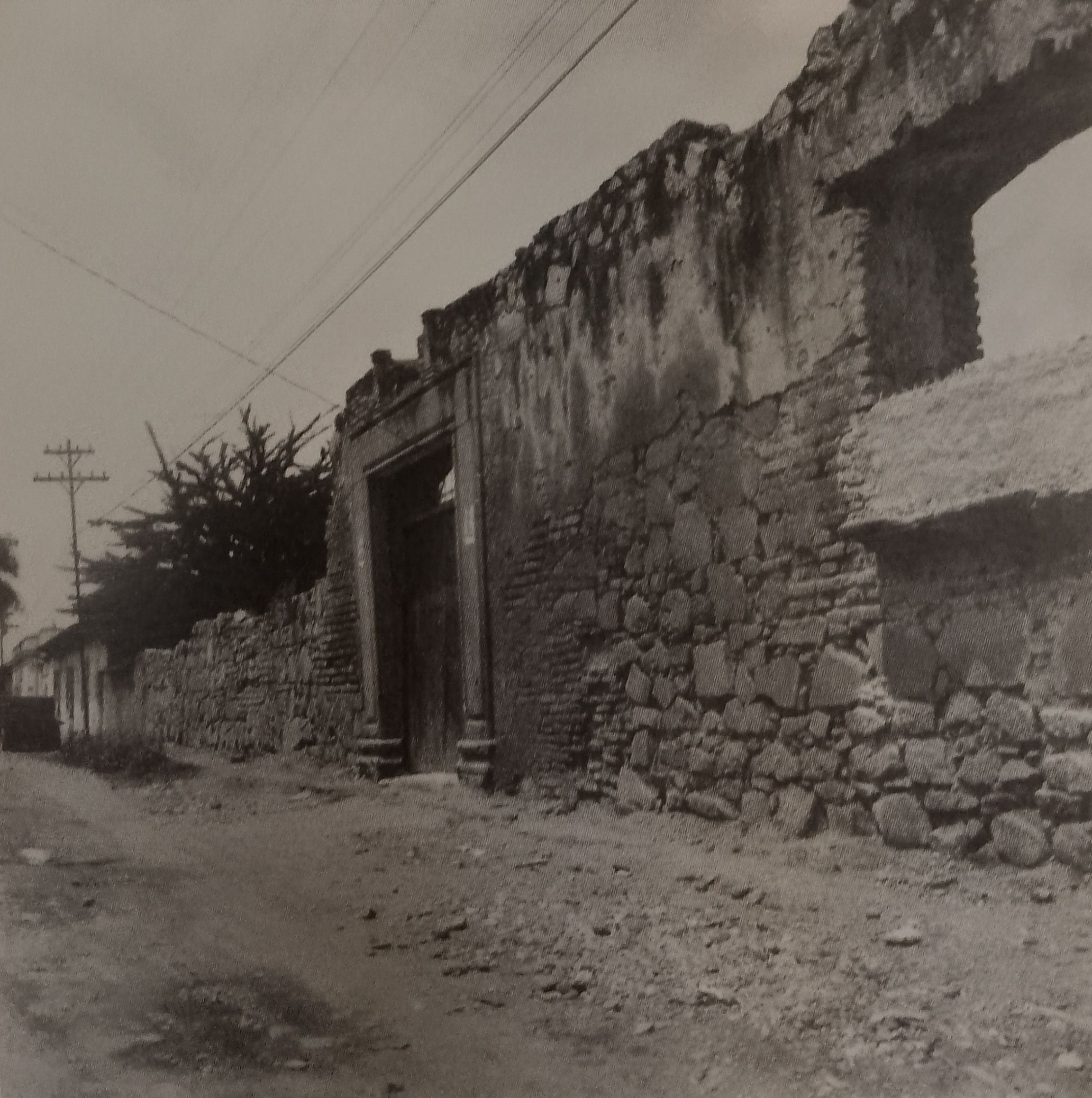
The ruins during the 1970s.

In 1809 another earthquake managed to destroy it completely and it was decided not to repair it due to the danger it represented. After independence and the republican era it passed by a few owners, however there was never an attempt by any of them to rehabilitate it or remove the remaining structures, after the beginning of the 20th century the house was completely abandoned although it was still visited by tourists due to its importance. historic, however it would not be rebuilt until decades later.

=== 21st century ===
At the beginning of the 2000s, archaeological excavations were carried out in Caxa Real, which allowed a better understanding of the historical development of the city of Comayagua. This royal house was originally conceived as a house that replaced in the 18th century a predecessor building whose original location is still unknown. The fact that such a building was demolished to make way for the new one indicates that the location would be close to where the house is today. After these studies it was determined that the ruins were part of the historical heritage of Comayagua and their rehabilitation would begin in future years.

=== Rehabilitation ===
In 2013 it was declared a national monument. After the cathedral was restored in its entirety, as part of the project to rehabilitate the historic center of the city of Comayagua, a work directed by the Honduran Institute of Anthropology and History, with the cooperation of the Spanish Cooperation Agency. After several studies and the restoration process begins. After that, it was inaugurated as a meeting center, where people such as Queen Letizia of Spain and the former president of Mexico Enrique Peña Nieto were received. Currently, it continues to receive important political figures and is the center of important events.

== See also ==
- Saint Agustín College (Honduras)
- History of Honduras
