= Comayagua cathedral clock =

Clock in Comayagua

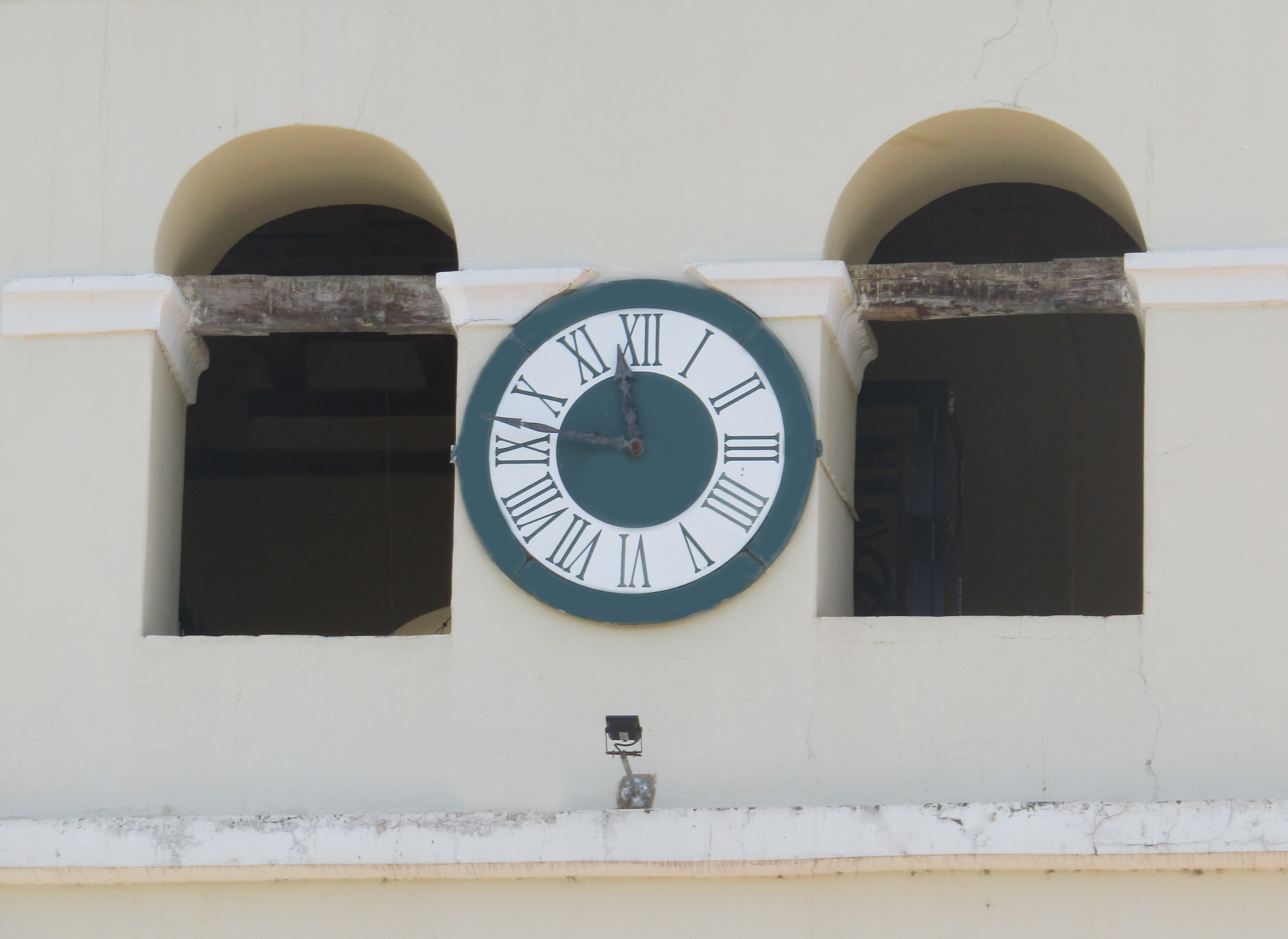
The clock in 2022.

The Comayagua cathedral clock, also known as the Arabic clock or the Comayagua clock, is a gear clock dated from the medieval times located in the city of Comayagua, in the Republic of Honduras. It is considered the oldest clock in the Americas and the oldest gear clock in the world still in operation since it has been working presumably for more than 900 years.

== History ==
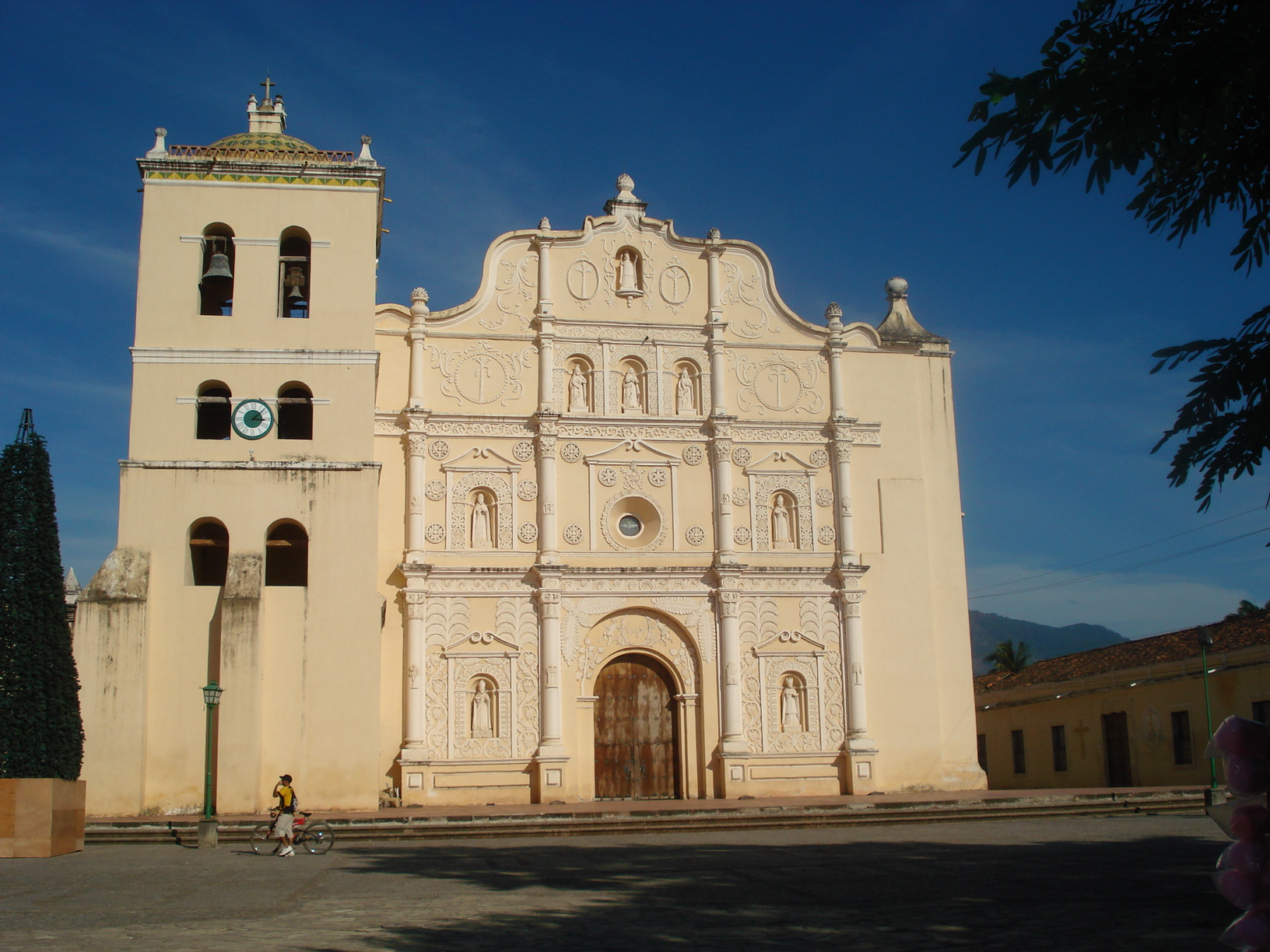
View of the clock at the Catheral tower.

The gears were presumably made and assembled by the Spanish moors in Al-Andalus during the Almoravid Empire period around the year 1100 during the reign of Yusuf ibn Tashfin. Before being transferred to the Americas, according to the chronicles before it landed to American soil it was working on the Arab palace of the Alhambra in Granada, Spain. After the end of the Reconquista and the expulsion of the Muslims and Jews from Castille the palace was occupied by the kings of Spain since Charles V. during the 17th century by order of King Felipe III of Spain, it was transferred to Las Hibueras region (present-day Honduras) of New Spain, where it would function as the city clock.

Initially it functioned in the Church of La Merced, which was at that time the cathedral of the city, being installed in 1636. However, by 1711 it was relocated to the recently completed Cathedral of the Immaculate Conception, which at that time was the largest building in the city and one of the largest cathedrals in Central America during the viceroyalty of New Spain, being installed in the bell tower of the temple.

During 2007 it was subjected to a restoration process by the Municipal Mayor's Office, the National Congress of Honduras, the Comayagüense Cultural Committee and the supervision of the Honduran Institute of Anthropology and History, for which the master watchmaker Rodolfo Antonio Cerón Martínez from Guatemala was located, who after five months of hard work concluded his work on December 20, 2007.

== Characteristics ==
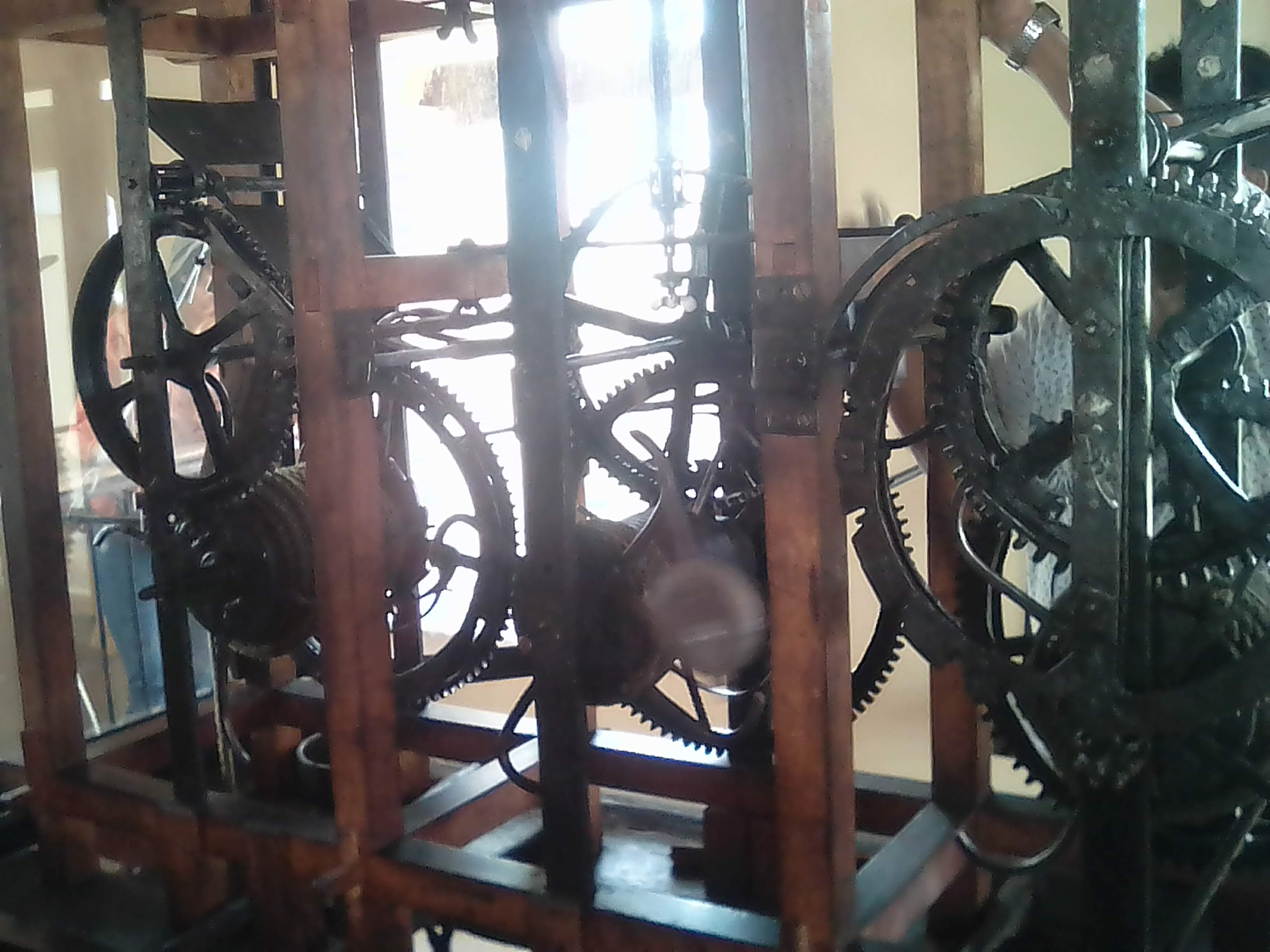
Clock gears mechanism.

The mechanism based on gears, ropes, weights and a pendulum, the whole set shows the time on the face located on the facade of the church where the number 4 is written in an old version of Roman numerals, showing as IIII instead of IV as most of us know it.

== Studies and debate ==
For a time it was believed that the oldest gear clock was the one in Salisbury Cathedral in England, since it was made in 1386. However, when the material with which it was made was studied, it was identified that it was built with iron with a much older technique than the Salisbury one was made with, therefore several different historians and researchers assume that this is the oldest working gear clock in the world.

However, the debate about its antiquity is still current, as some historians have said that the clock cannot be of the age attributed to it since there are no specific historical records that confirm that at the end of the 11th century and the beginning of the 12th century Mechanisms to measure time based on gears were common, since most clocks of the time were made of sand or water. Therefore, these historians give the real date of construction around the year 1374.

However, those who support the theory that it actually belongs to the 11th century mention the study that was carried out by researchers where it was discovered that the way it was made was based on the wrought iron technique, a much older technique than that with which the Salisbury clock was made, in addition to finding some inscriptions on one of the gears that say "Espana 1100" which gives greater support to the possibility that it is from the period that is assigned.

== See also ==
- History of Honduras
- History of Spain
- Spanish Empire
