= Immaculate Conception Cathedral, Comayagua =

Coordinates: 14.4667°N 87.6500°W

Immaculate Conception Cathedral
- Catedral de Comayagua
- Catedral de la inmaculada concepción
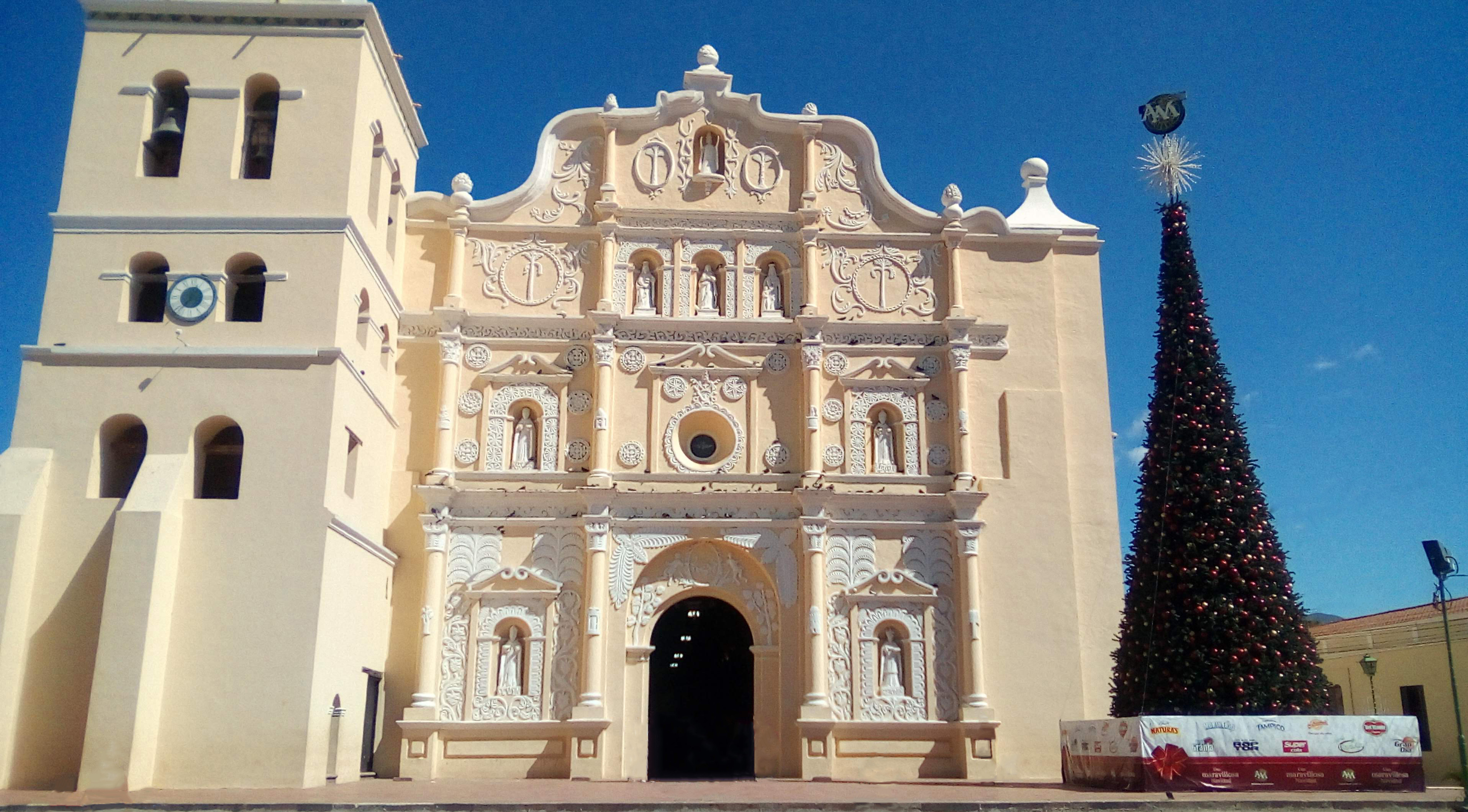
- Immaculate Conception Cathedral
- Location: Comayagua
- Country: Honduras
- Denomination: Roman Catholic Church

Architecture
- Style: Baroque, Plateresque, Renaissance
- Years built: • 1563, first stage • 1611–1634, second stage • 1705–1711, last stage

The Immaculate Conception Cathedral (Spanish: Catedral de la Inmaculada Concepción) also called Comayagua Cathedral is dedicated to the Virgin Mary and is located in the Central Square of the city of Comayagua in Honduras. It is one of the oldest cathedrals in Central America, it went through construction phases that date from the 16th century until it was completed inaugurated on December 8, 1711, and blessed in 1715, and many modifications since the 18th century.

== History ==
The cathedral has more than 400 years of history, however there are not enough historical documents such as plans or drawings that speak about the construction process of the building through time. Due to this enormous problem, the historical evolution of the Cathedral of Comayagua has so far been a difficult problem to understand.

In the same way, various investigations and thanks to the Historical Archeology inside the building, it has been possible to better understand its history and the various changes and reconstructions that it has had over the centuries

=== Colonial era ===
By the seventeenth century the city lacked a large temple, since the only cathedral in the city was the Iglesia de la Merced, so in 1563 permission was requested to build a larger temple that would function as another cathedral of the town of Comayagua. Thus the cathedral was started.

According to the historical notes of the historian Mario Felipe Martínez, this first Cathedral was damaged around 1610 due to inclement weather, most likely due to rain storms that they caused the structure to start collapsing. So, the authorities gave the green light for the reconstruction, starting in 1611. Among its supervisors was the Spanish Bishop Alonso Vargas y Abarca, continued by Bishop Fray Juan Pérez Carpintero and finished by Bishop Fray Antonio López de Guadalupe. Many of his pieces were brought from Spain, more specifically from the city of Jaén. According to data from the Honduran Institute of Anthropology and History (IHAH), around 18 indigenous peoples worked on the construction of the Catholic monument.

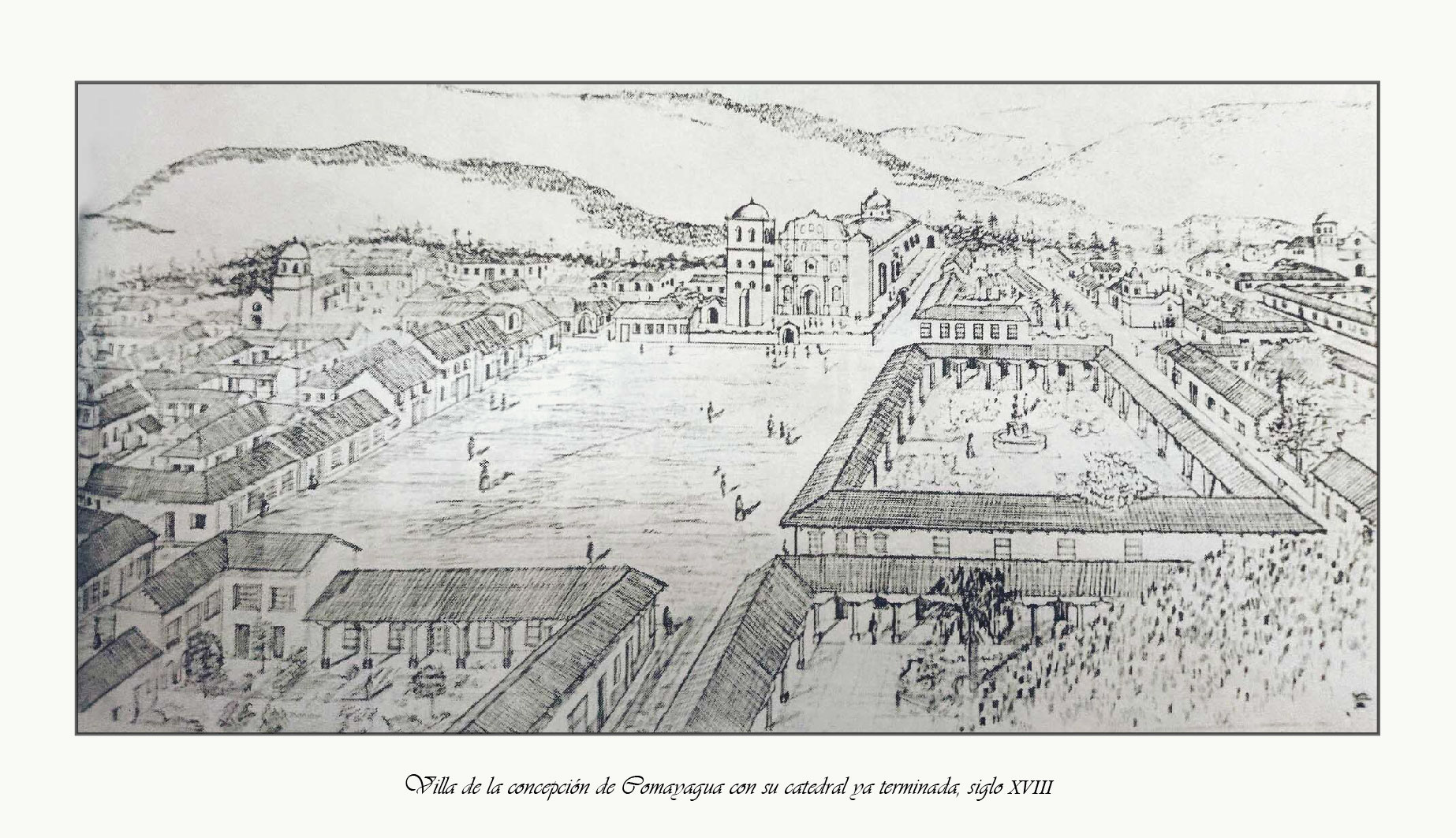
An illustration showing the city at the beginning of the 18th century; by then the cathedral was going through its third construction phase.

Finally, in the 18th century, the last construction phase of the cathedral began. By 1703, the bishop spoke in his letters sent to King Felipe V that the second phase already showed signs of deterioration in its structure and it was said that it needed remodeling after seeing the poor condition of the walls, so in 1705 the third phase began. During this stage, the façade is modified, giving shape to the current one and the final shape that we all know today is finished. The cathedral was blessed in 1715.

=== Republican era ===
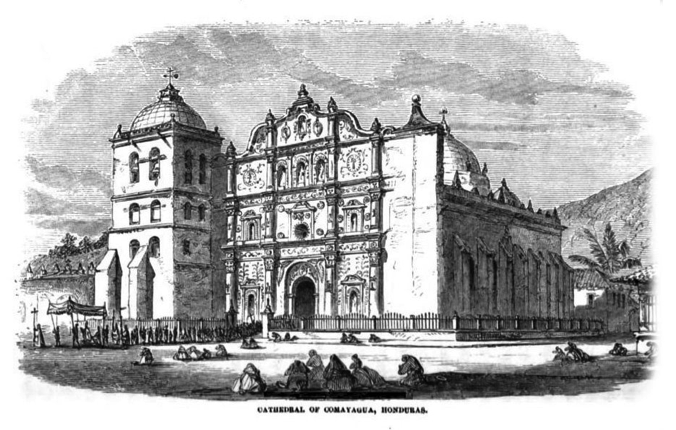
View of a procession in Cathedral de Comayagua in 1859 during the travels of E.G Squier.

For the eighteenth century it was a temple, it was the largest building in the province of Honduras and for the nineteenth century it was the wedding place of General Francisco Morazán on December 30, 1825. On April 4, 1827, Comayagua was burned and looted during the Central American civil war. largely by José Nicolás Irías Midence, with the support of the president of the republic, General Manuel José Arce because they belonged to the conservative side of the Central American federal republic. As a result, the cathedral was damaged and looted by the Midence army.

In the middle of the 19th century, Monsignor Juan Felipe Zepeda took the post of bishop, who in his position designated 100,000 pesos a month from the tithes of the Holy Cathedral, for the musicians and when the aforementioned priest received an inheritance from his father who lived in Olancho He invested it in improving the cathedral, another part was given to the poor and with the rest he signed a contract with the Clamer House in London for the construction of an organ that would be donated to the cathedral.

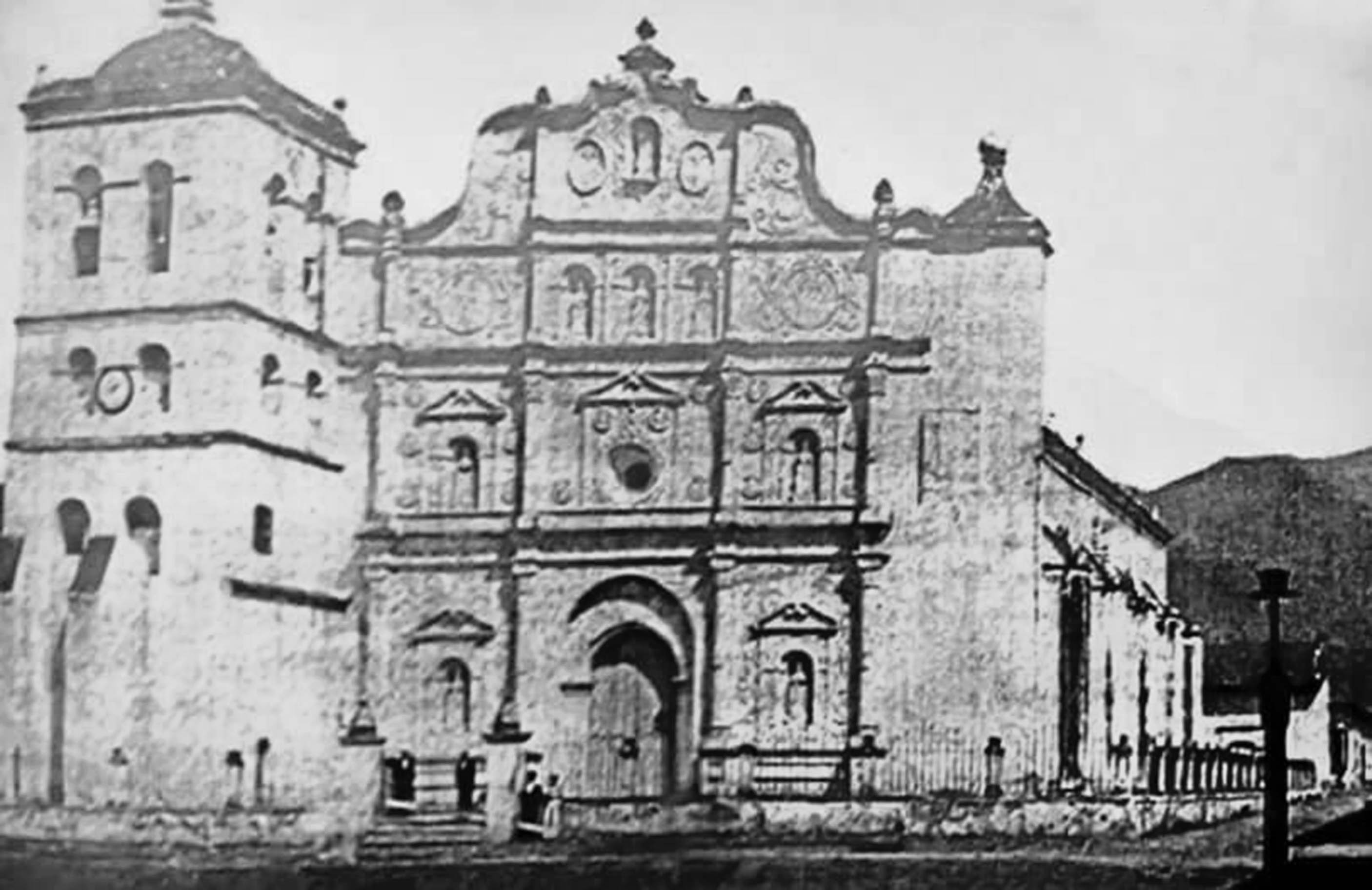
The appearance of the temple at the beginning of the 20th century when the modifications that occurred during the rest of the century had not yet been made, such as the dismantling of the choir and the mezzanine that housed the cathedral until the 1930s.

Over the centuries, graves were made inside the temple, according to the local researcher and historian Tirso Zapata, among the deceased who are inside the cathedral are that of the bishops Don Juan Merlo de la Fuente and Fray Gaspar de Andrade which in the sixties, their bodies which possessed a cadaverous incorruptibility, were exposed to the general public in glass urns, but in 1963 the late Monsignor Bernandino Mozzarella ordered to hide them so they never became exhibited.

Its structure is made of brick and adobe walls and a tile roof with craftsmanship. It also has 10 windows that illuminate its interior and it has five bodies divided by ten cruciform pilasters that form arches. The cathedral was dedicated to Santa María, mother of Jesus and was built in the Central Plaza of the city. At the beginning of this century, it was fully restored as part of the rehabilitation project of the historic center of the city, a work directed by the IHAH, with the collaboration of the Spanish Cooperation Agency. Today the cathedral continues to be a meeting point for the people of Comayagüenses and one of its most valued historical sites, along with the other colonial churches, the churches of La Merced, San Francisco, San Sebastián and La Caridad.

== Architecture ==
=== Inside ===
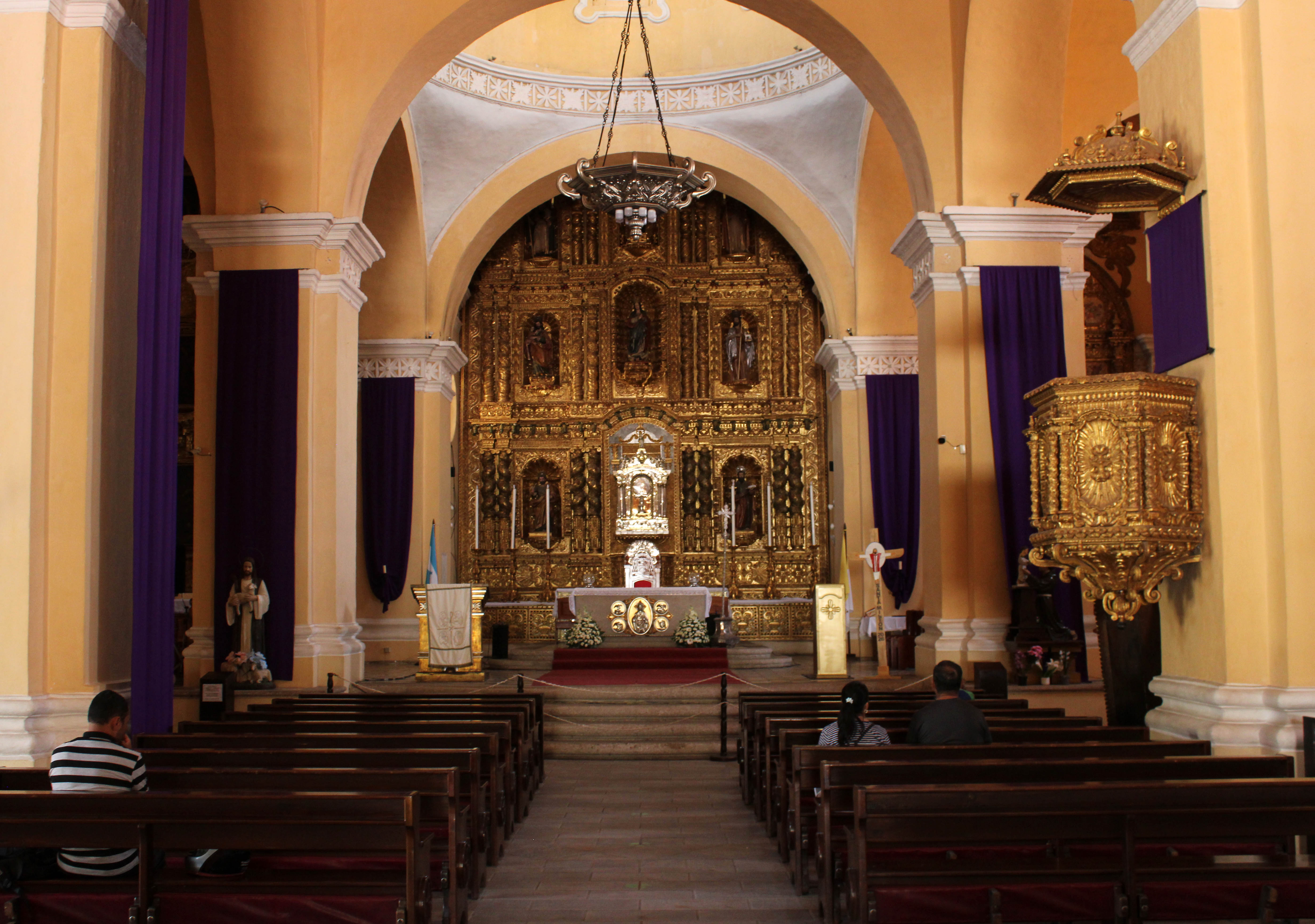
The altarpieces were made on Honduran soil, and feature an image of the Immaculate Conception and a crucifix made by the Spanish artist Francisco De Ocampo in the city of Jaén, Spain.

It consists of a Latin cross plan with three naves with a barrel vault, with five sections, the presbytery is covered with three hemispherical domes. It has an annex where the chapel of the Blessed Sacrament is located. On the main altar you can see a gilded wooden altarpiece, with a carving of the image of the Immaculate Conception and an crucifix made in 1620 by the Spanish artist Francisco de Ocampo and donated to the city by King Felipe II of Spain.

It is said that originally the cathedral had 16 altarpieces or altars, however today it only has the 4 largest altars decorated with fine carved wood finishes and covered with gold sheets, others with beautiful paintings and others are adorned with beautiful images. The eight images that are distributed in the temple, were donated by Felipe VI of Spain, as well as the crucified one donated in 1620 and made by the Jaén sculptor Francisco de Ocampo.

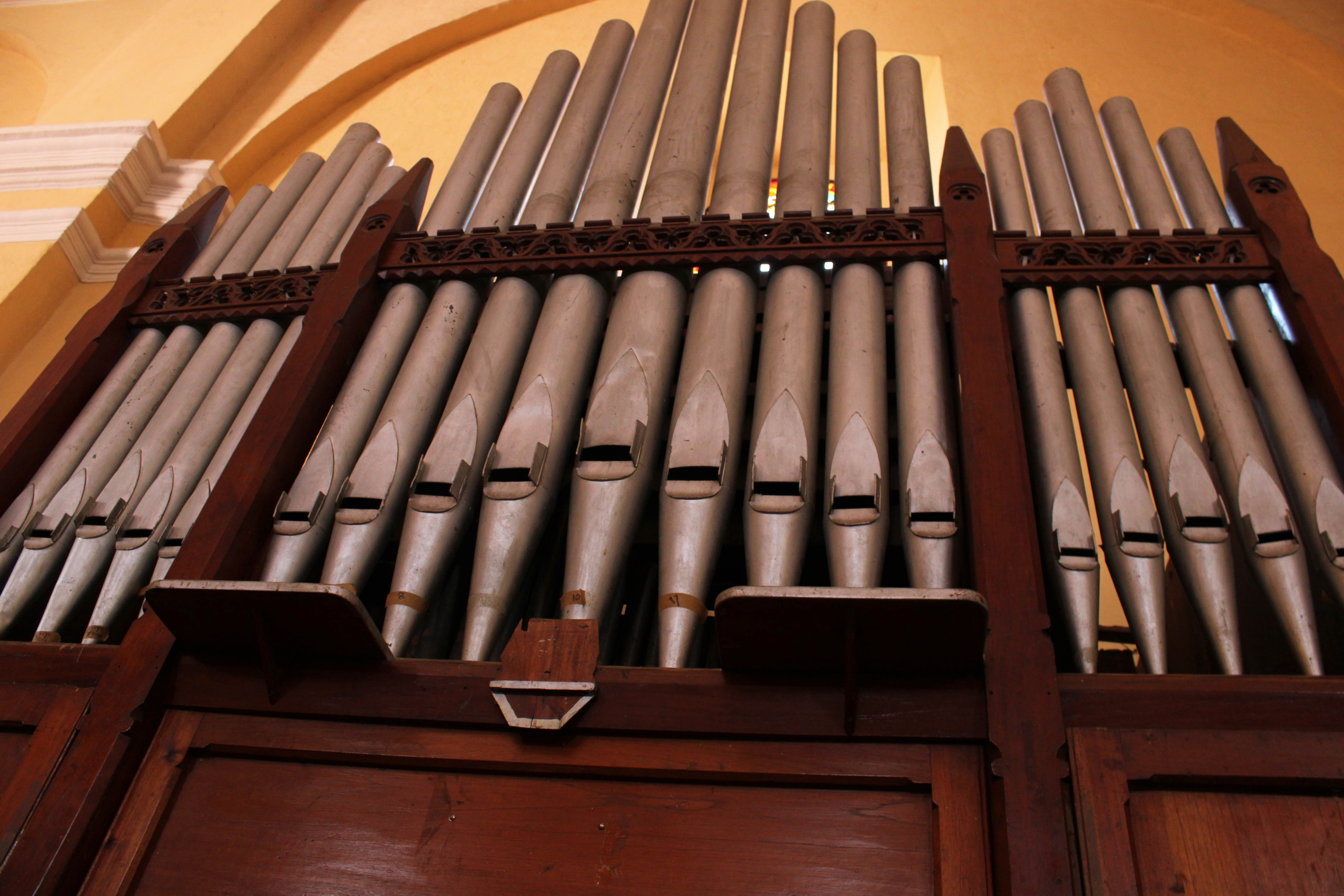
Old pipe Organ.

The restoration works of the cathedral could see the remains of what was the Cathedral Choir. By removing the current floor and going down in the leveling fill of it, they could see the challenges of the foundation of the original Choir which was built in the 18th century and was demolished during the 30's of the 20th century. This feature was excavated to define its limits as well as its shape; finding that the entrance to the choir is in front of the high altar and that it had a three-lobed shape in its steps similar to that of the steps of the Presbytery.

The pulpit of the Cathedral of Comayagua was built on the same date as the altarpieces, they are in the Solomonic Baroque style. The current lamps that are hanging inside the ceiling of the cathedral are replicas of the original lamps made of silver which were transferred and can be seen on display in the colonial museum of Comayagua.The temple also has an organ, which arrived in the city on December 7, 1887, and was premiered in the Cathedral of Comayagua. The organ is no longer frequently used, an exception only for Holy Week, Christmas, or weddings.

Outside

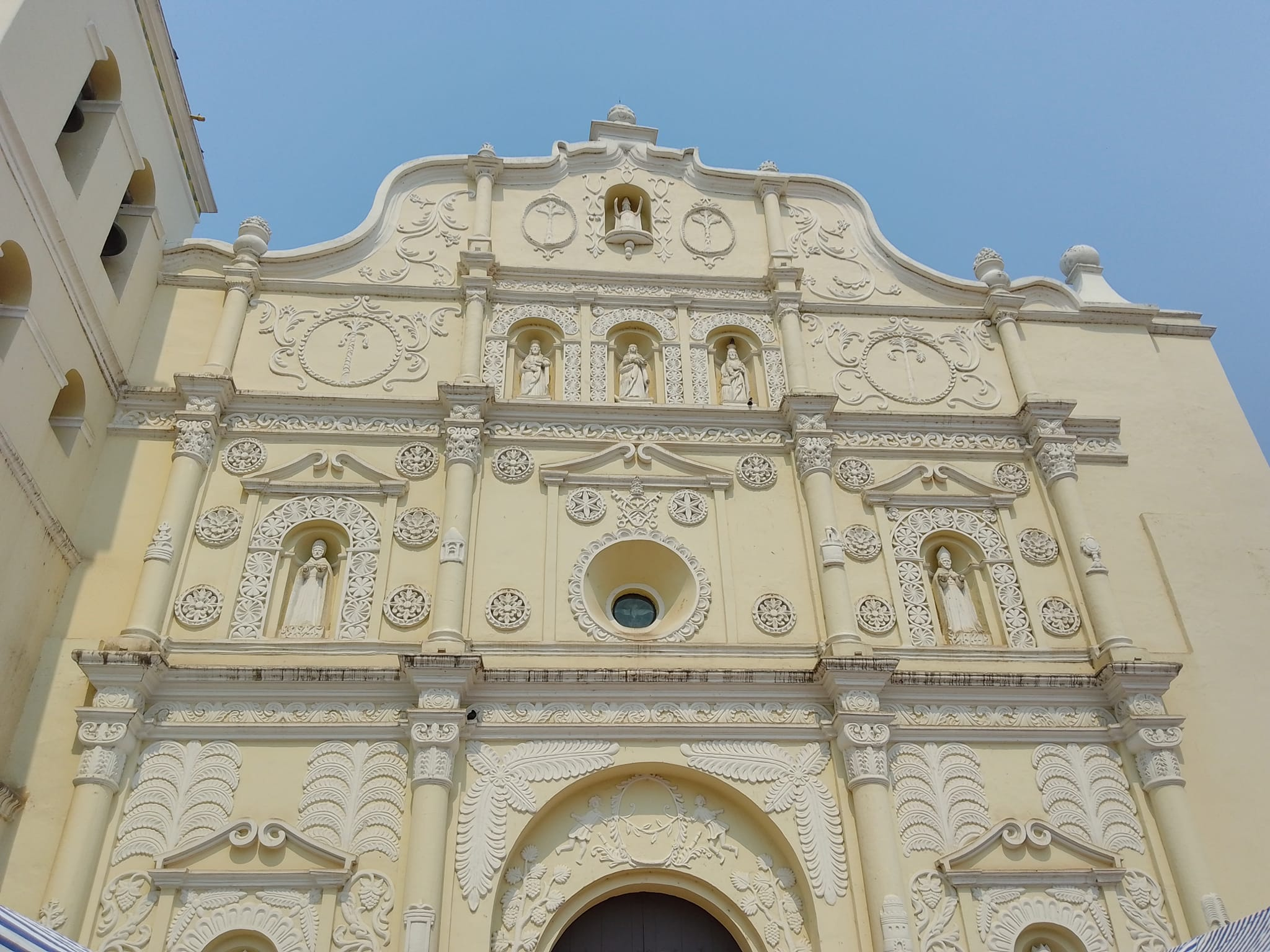
The cathedral shows a baroque style of architecture with some spanish Plateresque elements.

Outside, the façade has a Renaissance and baroque style. Its made in the form of an altarpiece with three streets, the central one wider where the semicircular arch entrance door is located. The streets are divided vertically by attached columns and horizontally by cornices forming four floors. Inside some niches of this facade, there are the images of four doctors of the Church in the side streets and in the central one, on the third floor, there are the statues of the Virgin Mary and on their sides Saint John the Baptist and Saint Joseph.The garden on the left side underwent several modifications during and after its construction, initially this was the cathedral's cemetery destined for the graves of religious officials such as bishops.

However, this was closed in the nineteenth century to make way for the creation of a garden. This was due to the fact that in March 1843 a law was issued that prohibited giving land in church patios. Finally on the fourth floor is the figure of Christ blessing. The four-story bell tower stands out on the left side of this main façade, the last one is where the eight bells that it has are placed, later in its construction to the façade, this bell tower is finished off with a glazed colored ceramic dome.

=== Clock ===
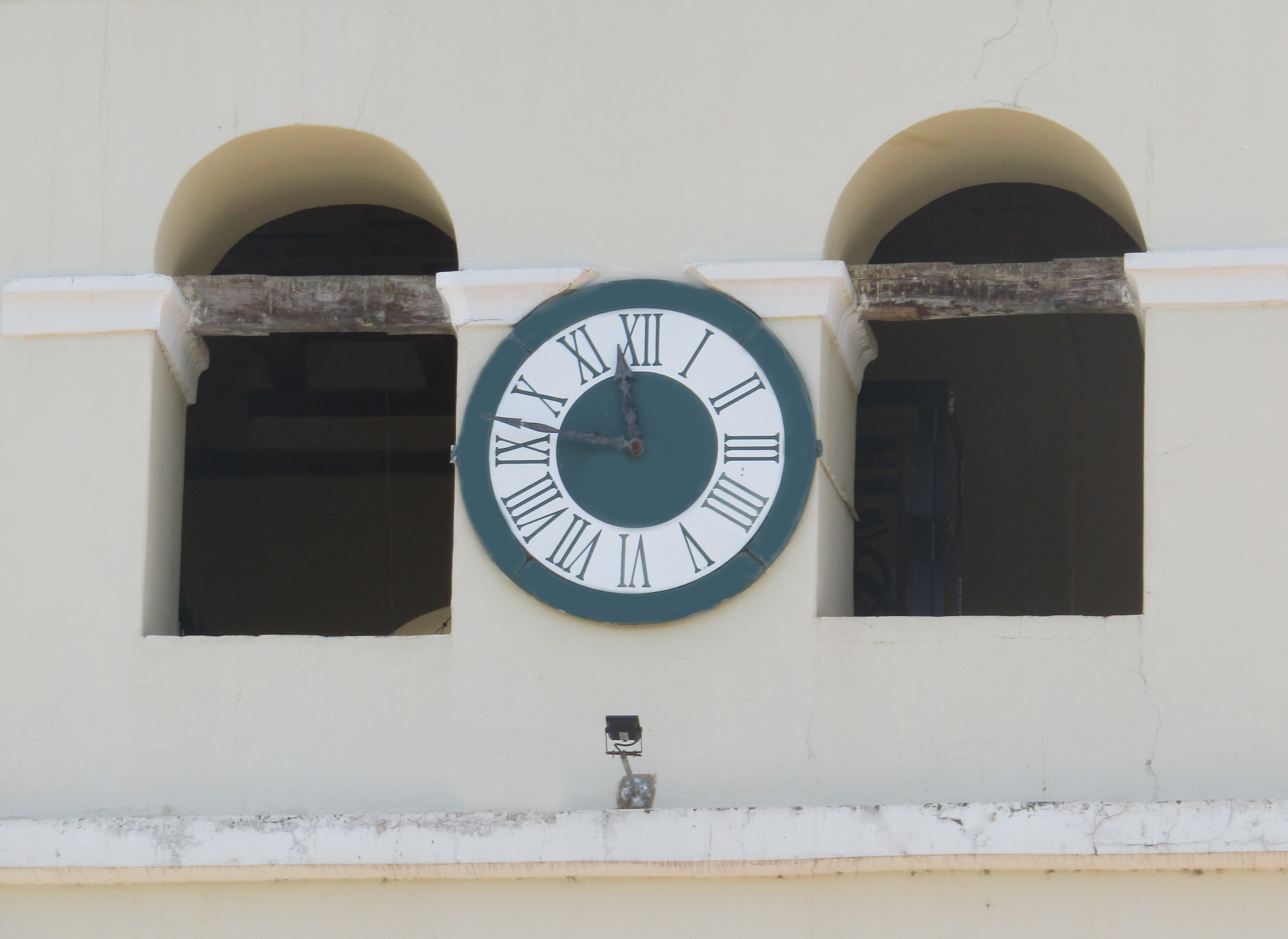
The clock is considered to be the oldest in the Americas and the second oldest in the world.

In the tower of the cathedral there is also the oldest clock in the Americas, built by the Arabs during their occupation in Spain in the Middle Ages around the year 1100. Before it was transferred to the Americas, it was working in the Alhambra, the Arab palace in the city of Granada, the capital of the last Muslim kingdom of the Iberian peninsula.

On the orders of King Felipe III of Spain, it was transferred to the Hibueras region of the New Spain where it would function as the city's clock. The clock mechanism is based on gears, ropes, weights and a pendulum, the whole set shows the time on the dial located on the facade of the church where the number 4 in Roman numerals is shown as IIII and not as IV. Before being installed in the cathedral, it worked for a time in the church of La Merced, which functioned as the previous cathedral of the city until the completion of that of the immaculate conception in 1715.

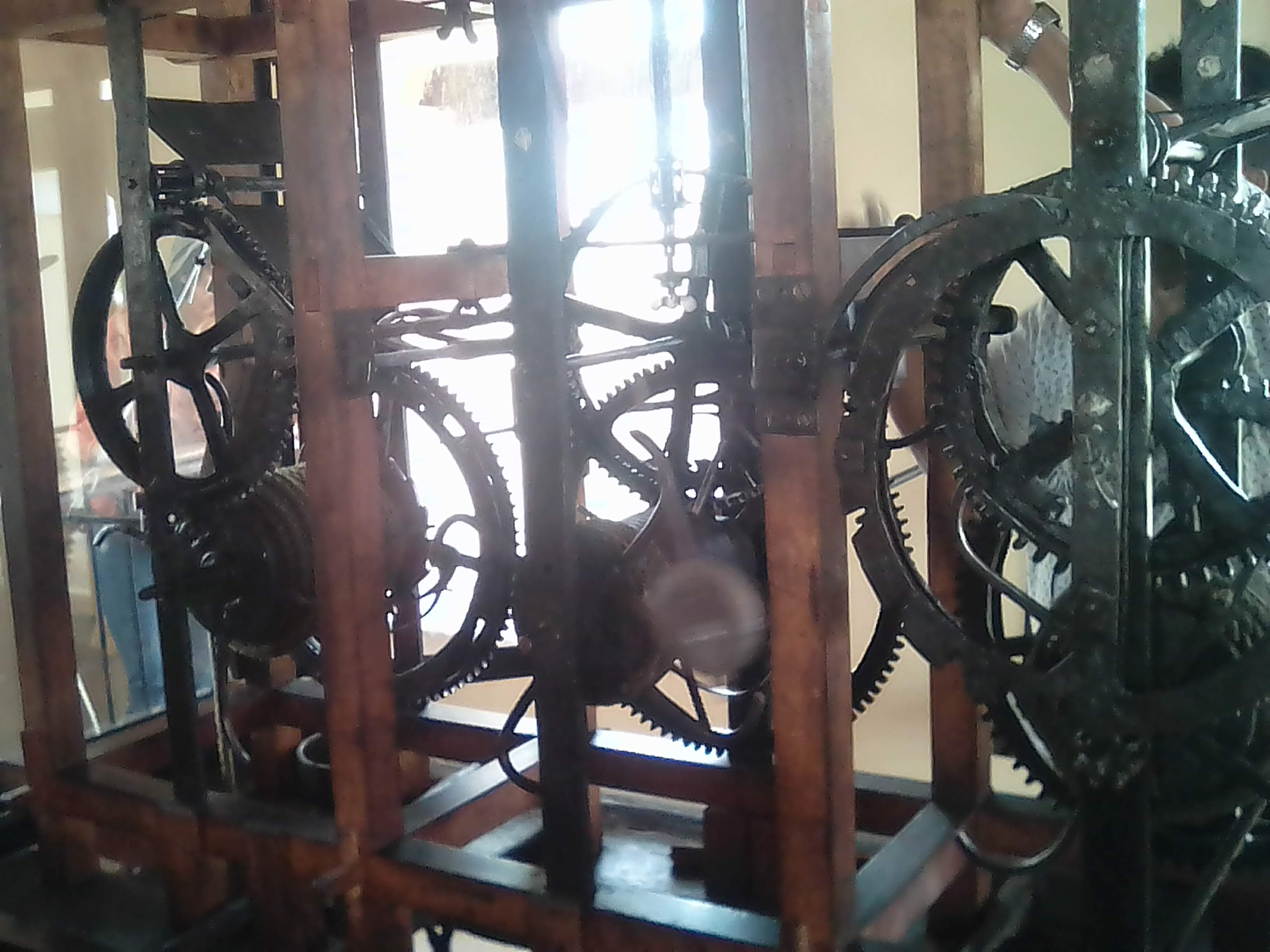
Clock mechanism protected in a crystal case

During 2007 it was subjected to a restoration process by the Municipal Mayor's Office, the National Congress, the Comayagüense Cultural Committee and the supervision of the Honduran Institute of Anthropology and History, for which the master watchmaker Rodolfo Antonio Cerón Martínez from Guatemala was located, who after five months of hard work concluded his work on December 20, 2007.

There is a conflict between whether or not it is the oldest on the planet, its contender is a watch found in England and it is alleged that it is the oldest, however, it is made on the basis of cast iron and that of Comayagua in wrought iron base, of the two techniques the wrought iron is older than the one used in the English clock so it follows that the Comayagua is the oldest.

== See also ==
- Roman Catholicism in Honduras
- Comayagua
- History of Honduras
