= Saint Agustín College (Honduras) =

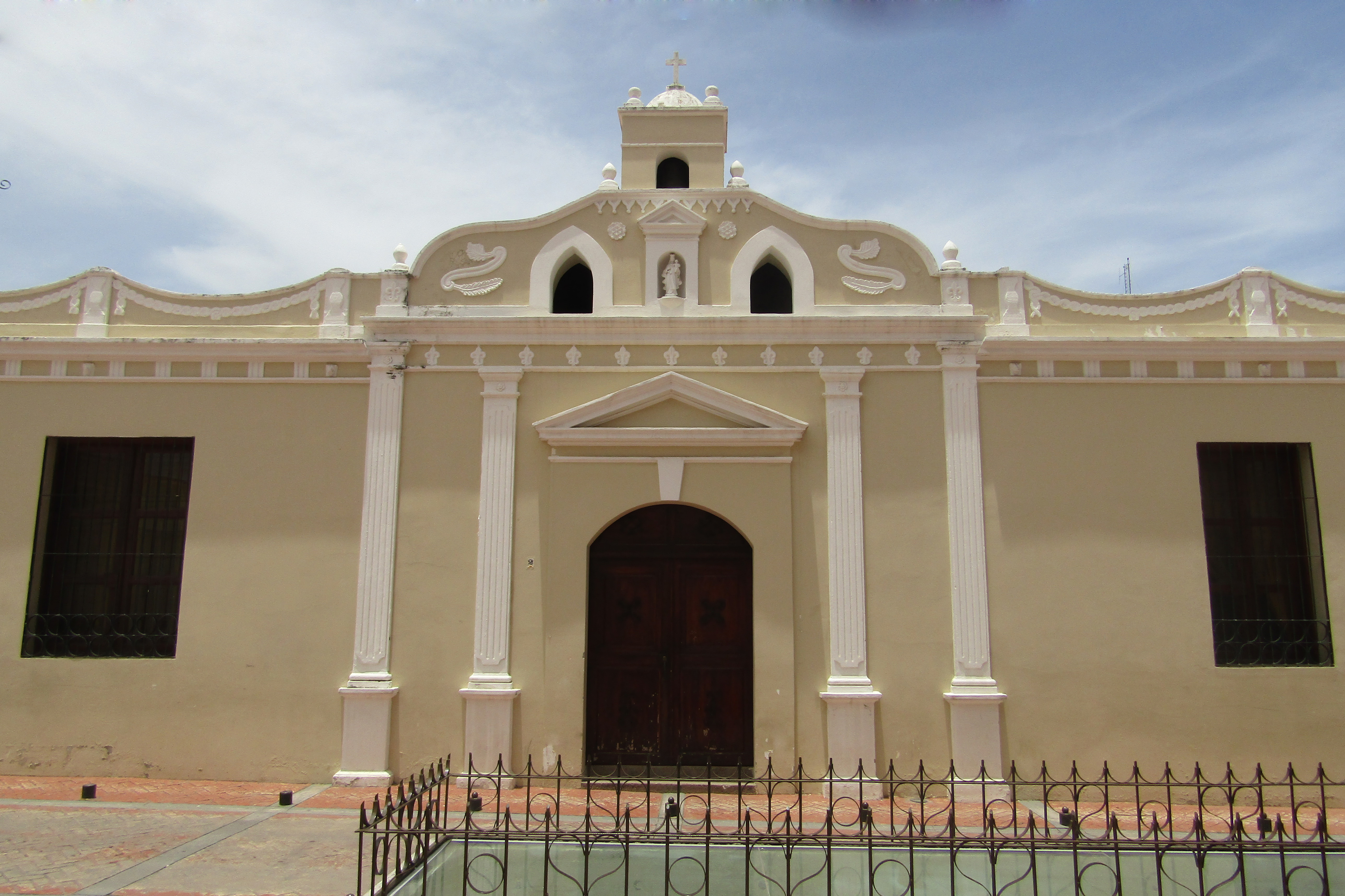
Palace facade after the 2012 restoration, is considered to be one of the oldest buildings in Honduras.

The Saint Agustín College, also known as Comayagua episcopal palace or "colegio tridentino de San Agustín de Comayagua" was higher academic Roman Catholic institution during the colonial period of New Spain in the province of Honduras.

== History ==
=== Background ===
Although in colonial times, education was imparted by the friars of the orders who settled in the Honduran territory, it was until February 20, 1564 that the first school was opened by Fray Jerónimo de Corella in Santa María de la Nueva Valladolid de Comayagua, to give grammar classes to the children of the Spaniards and Criollos. A few years later, in 1678, the creation of the college was requested, which was established in 1679 by means of a Royal Certificate and its building will be completed until 1684, with Bishop Fray Alonso Vargas y Abarca founding the Colegio Seminario de San Agustín from of the first basic school created by Corella, which served with classes of Castilian Grammar such as Latin Grammar, History, Mathematics, Theology and Morals.

=== Colonial period ===
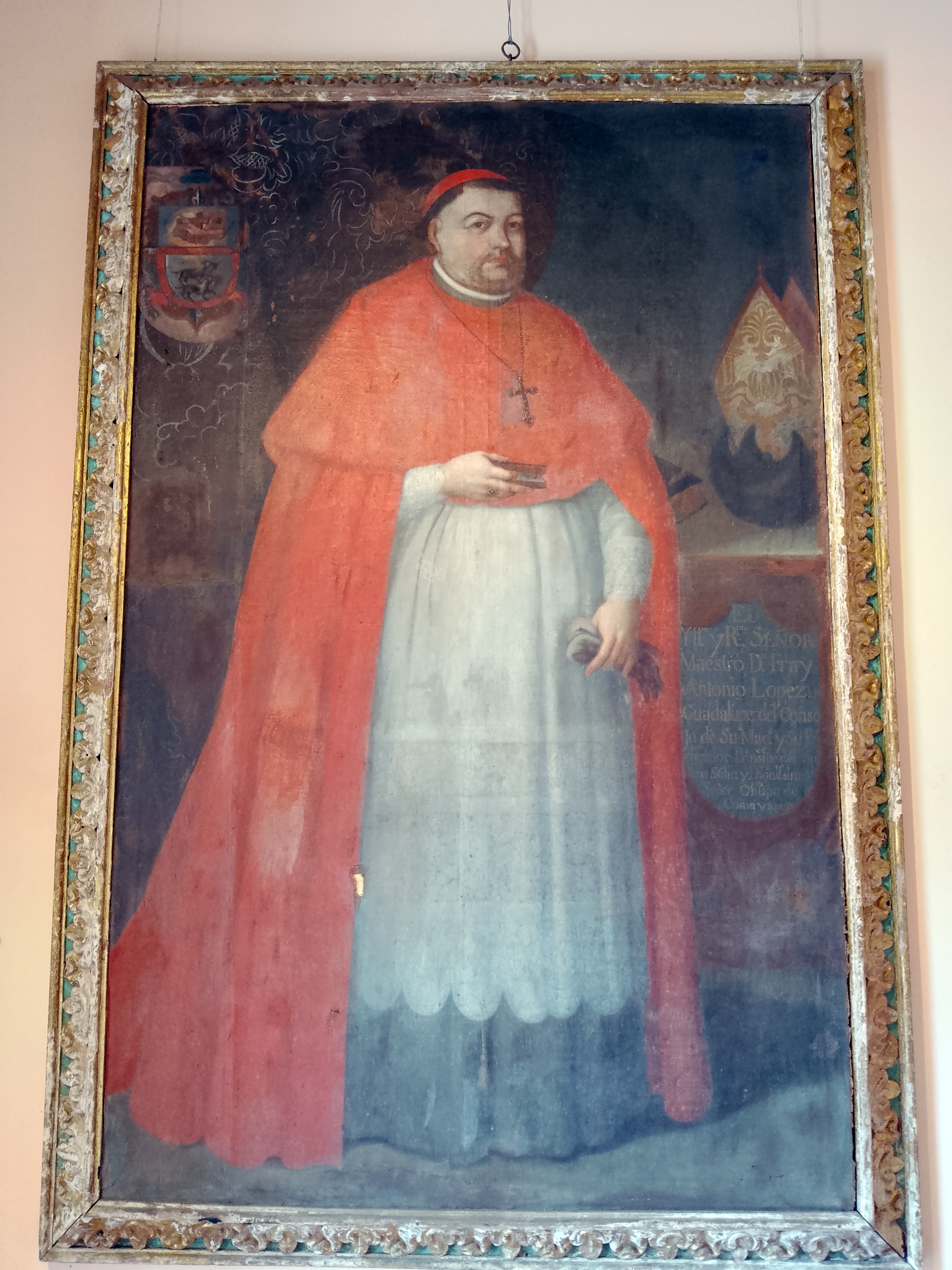
Mexican bishop based in Honduras, fray Antonio Guadalupe López Portillo.

The higher education center of the province of Honduras as it was known until the following century was founded by the Mexican religious Antonio Guadalupe López Portillo, who contributed with the construction of the center for the former Seminary College in 1731, which was completed in 1733 and was inaugurated and renamed as "Colegio Tridentino de San Agustín" in Comayagua. That later it was authorized by means of a Royal Certificate of His Majesty Don Felipe V of Spain, dated November 7, 1738 to teach the new classes and with a subsidy of 200 pesos that should be received by the Priest José Simón de Zelaya Cepeda, first rector and builder from the Cathedral of San Miguel (Tegucigalpa). Simón de Zelaya also gave classes in philosophy, Fray Fernando de Guadalupe, chairs of music and Gregorian songs.

On September 16, 1815, Mr. Francisco Moijan, representative of Comayagua, presented a request to the Cortes of Cádiz to raise the status of the Tridentine College of San Agustín to a University, since they had the basic requirements. Then in 1820, another request was presented for the opening of new careers such as: Laws, Medicine and Surgery and Mineralogy, because the province had innumerable mining deposits and also the classes of doctrinal and penitentiary Canon were suppressed. Both requests did not arrive with good results for the rectory, the following year in 1821 Doctor Mariano Méndez, gave a report to the Courts that in Comayagua there was only one seminary college with studies of Latin and Moral, then he proposed that authorization be given. for minor university studies, by virtue of the fact that in Guatemala and Nicaragua there were centers with higher education. This was not carried out due to the Declaration of Independence of Central America from the kingdom of Spain, on September 15, 1821, the Colegio Tridentino de San Agustín, would continue to be an educational center for lower studies.

=== Republican era ===
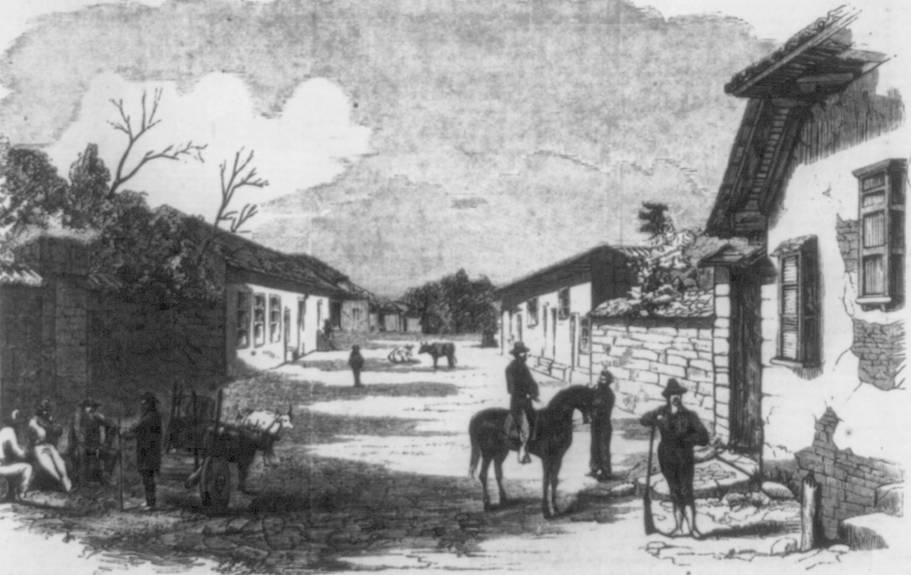
Comayagua during the 19th century.

Through the Ecumenical Council held in Trento, new directions were given to the Tridentine College, which operated until 1827, when it was closed due to the overthrow of the head of government of Mr. Dionisio de Herrera at the hands of General José Justo Milla and the forces Guatemalan federal invaders. After 17 years, closed in 1843, General Francisco Ferrera ordered the Tridentine College to be reopened, for which, on the occasion of the opening, the chairs of: Philosophy, Dogmatic Theology, Civil Law, Grammar and Medicine were requested to expand the number of chairs taught at the school; But bad news also arrived that in the Villa of Tegucigalpa, where politicians and religious were considering maintaining the Grammar Academy in that city, of which the Priest José Trinidad Reyes was rector, and because the Tridentino School lacked professors prepared to continue with the docent.

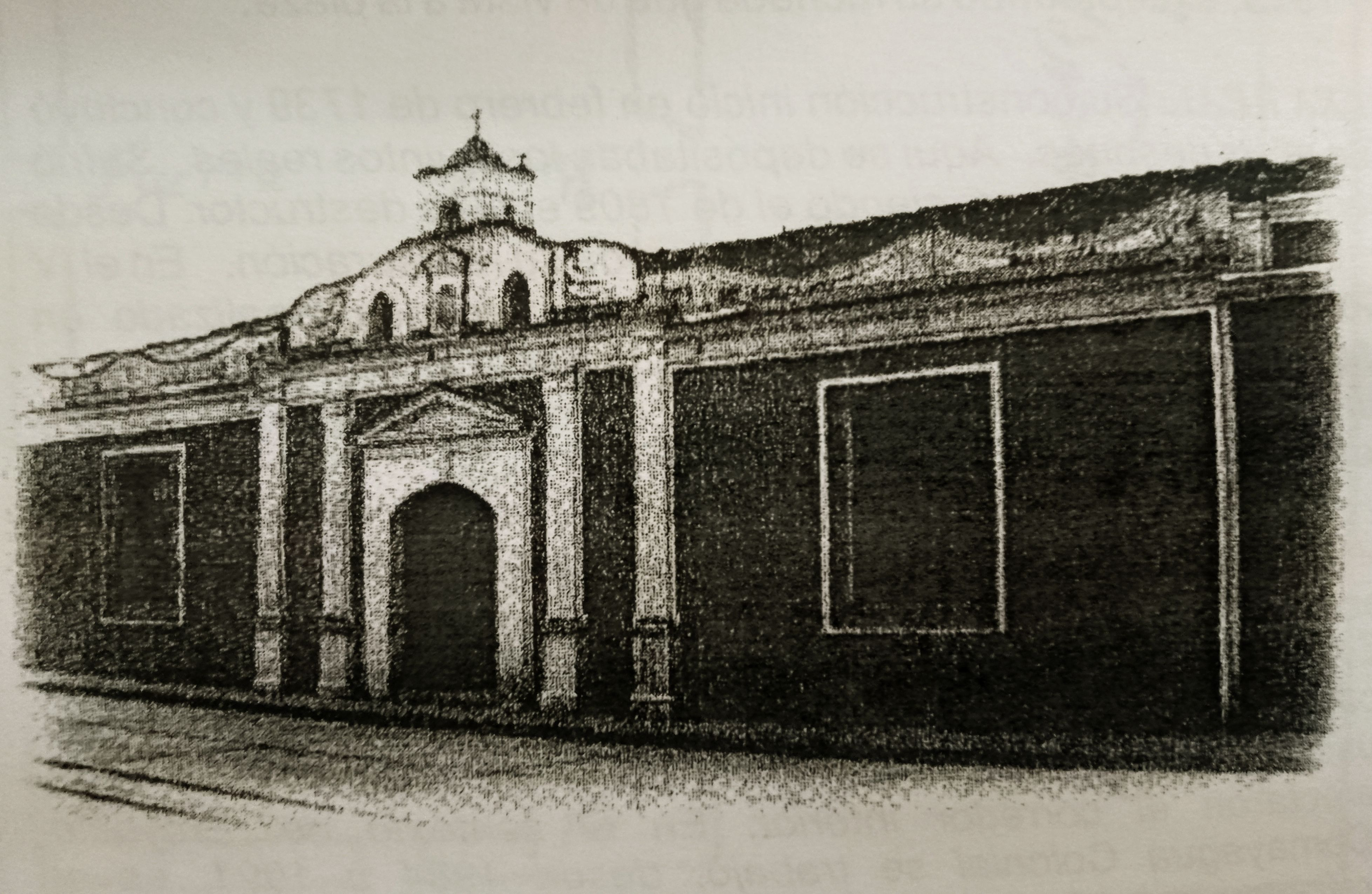
The building during the early 20th century.

In 1847, the government of the president, Don Juan Lindo, gave total interest in the creation of a university of a national character and at the level of its Salvadoran, Guatemalan and Nicaraguan homonyms. That is why by Decree it was elevated to the Literary Academy of Tegucigalpa as the Central University of Honduras. By 1848, the first national education book "Rudiments of Arithmetic" was published, written by Professor Domingo Dardano, a professor who was from the "Colegio Tridentino de Comayagua".

The Tridentino School was closed again in 1856 by the Hierarch of the Diocese of Comayagua, Bishop Hipólito Casiano Flores, who was at odds with the Honduran government, a year later it was reopened under the presidency of Brigadier General José Santos Guardiola, until its total and definitive closure, due to the lack of clerical and governmental support. In 1874 this building, President Carlos Céleo Arias López, signed his surrender of the government to General Ponciano Leiva Madrid.

== Reconstruction in 2012 ==
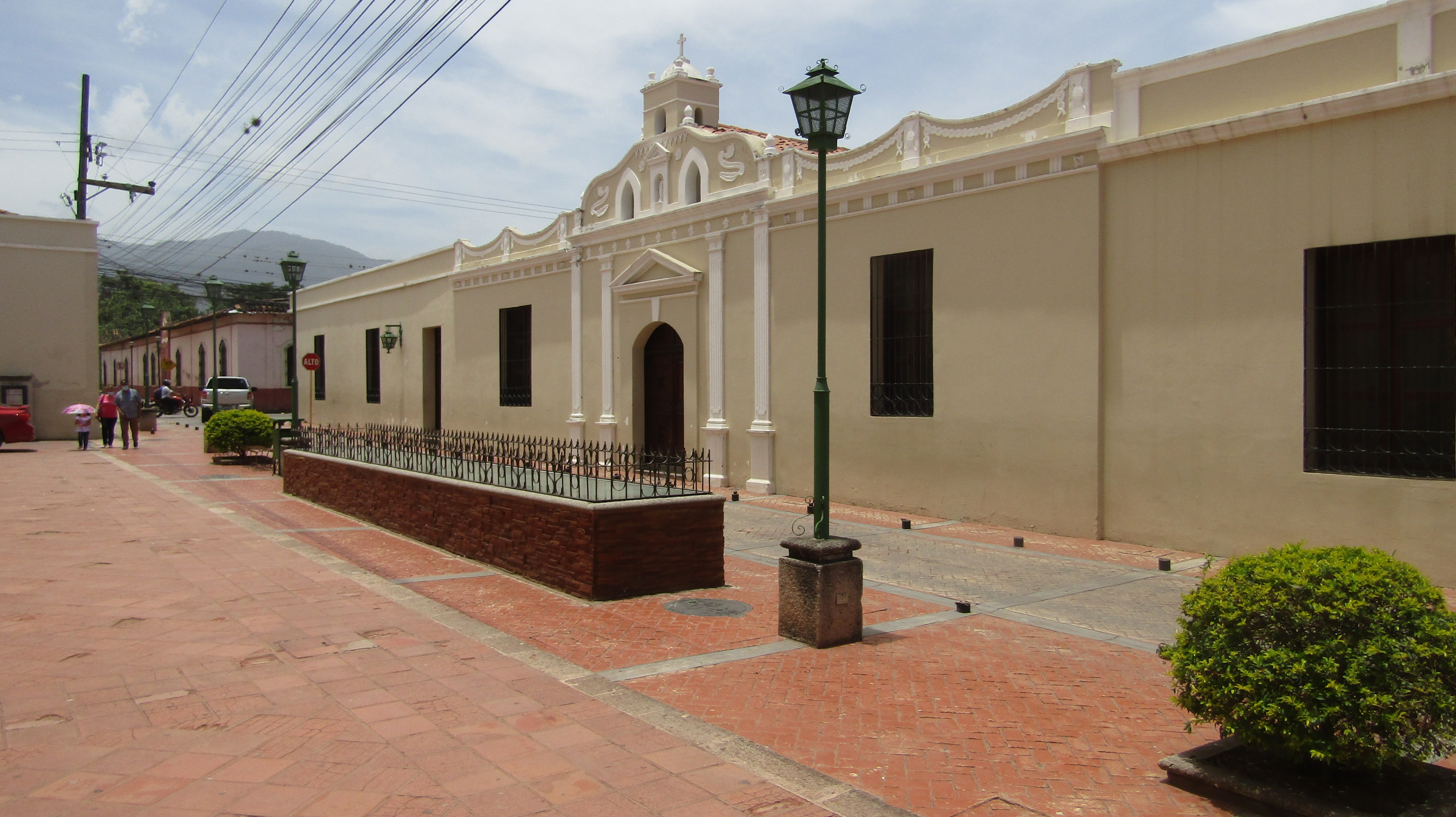
The palace is one of the most well preserved buildings in Comayagua.

The Episcopal Palace suffered a fire on the night of April 15, 2009 until the early hours of April 16. The fire damaged much of its structure, but it was possible to save almost all its collection of religious colonial art and the colonial archives of Honduras. With the help of the Honduran Institute of Anthropology and History, a process of reconstruction of the palace began with the formation of a committee led by Monsignor Roberto Camilleri.

The rebuilding was led by Carlos Yuja Vindel and took about three years to complete. The mahogany wood used in its reconstruction was donated and more than 130 doors and 100 windows were made. The reconstruction cost a total of 16 million Lempiras. The palace was reopened on August 24, 2012.

== Notable students ==
- General José Trinidad Cabañas Constitutional President of the Republic.
- Attorney Francisco Cruz Castro Provisional President of the Republic.
- Lawyer Céleo Arias Constitutional President of the Republic.
- Lawyer Luis Bográn Constitutional President of the Republic on two occasions.
- Engineer Terencio Sierra Constitutional President of the Republic.

== See also ==
- History of Honduras
