= Comayagua =

Comayagua Santa Maria de la Nueva Valladolid de Comayagua
- Municipality
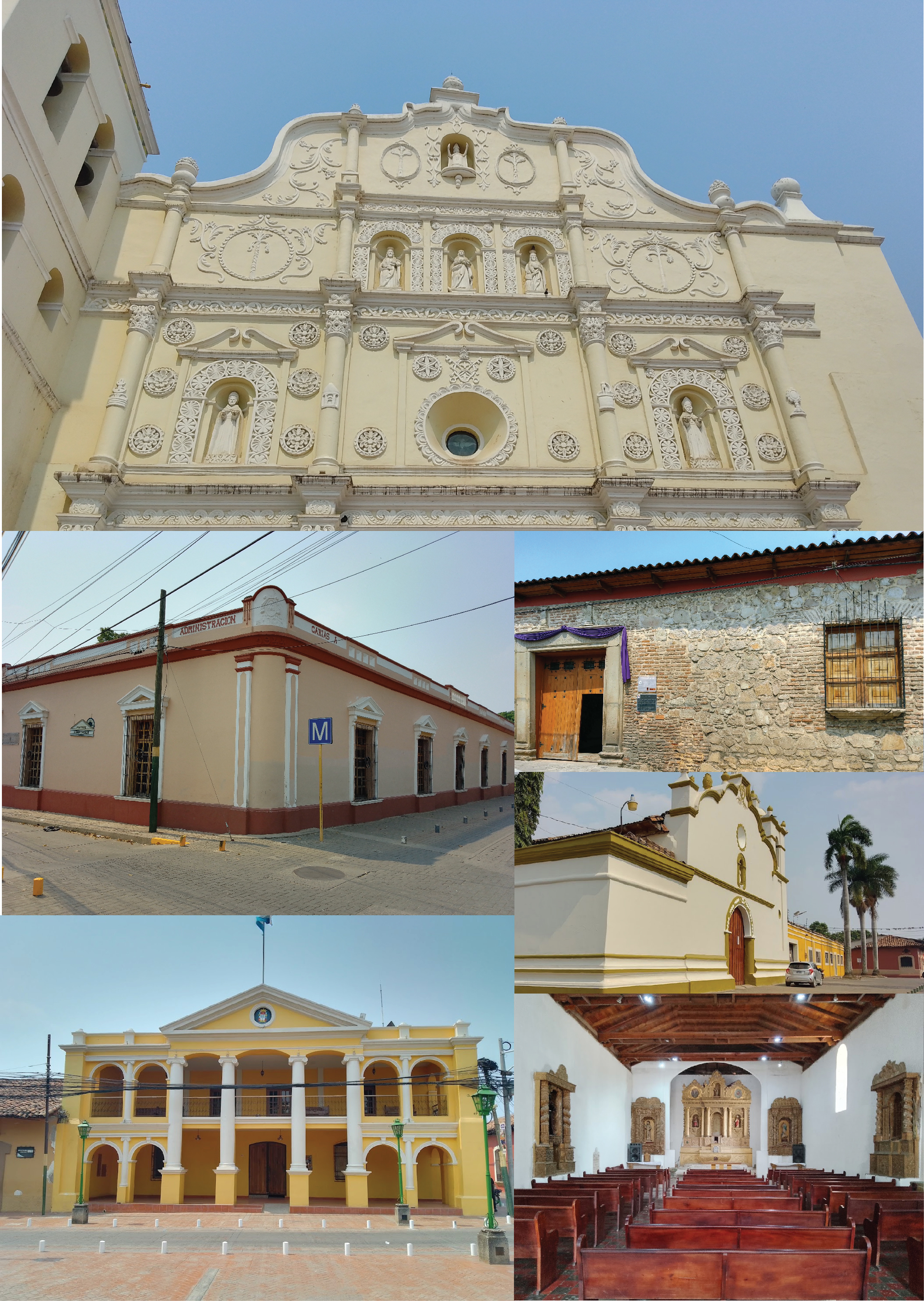

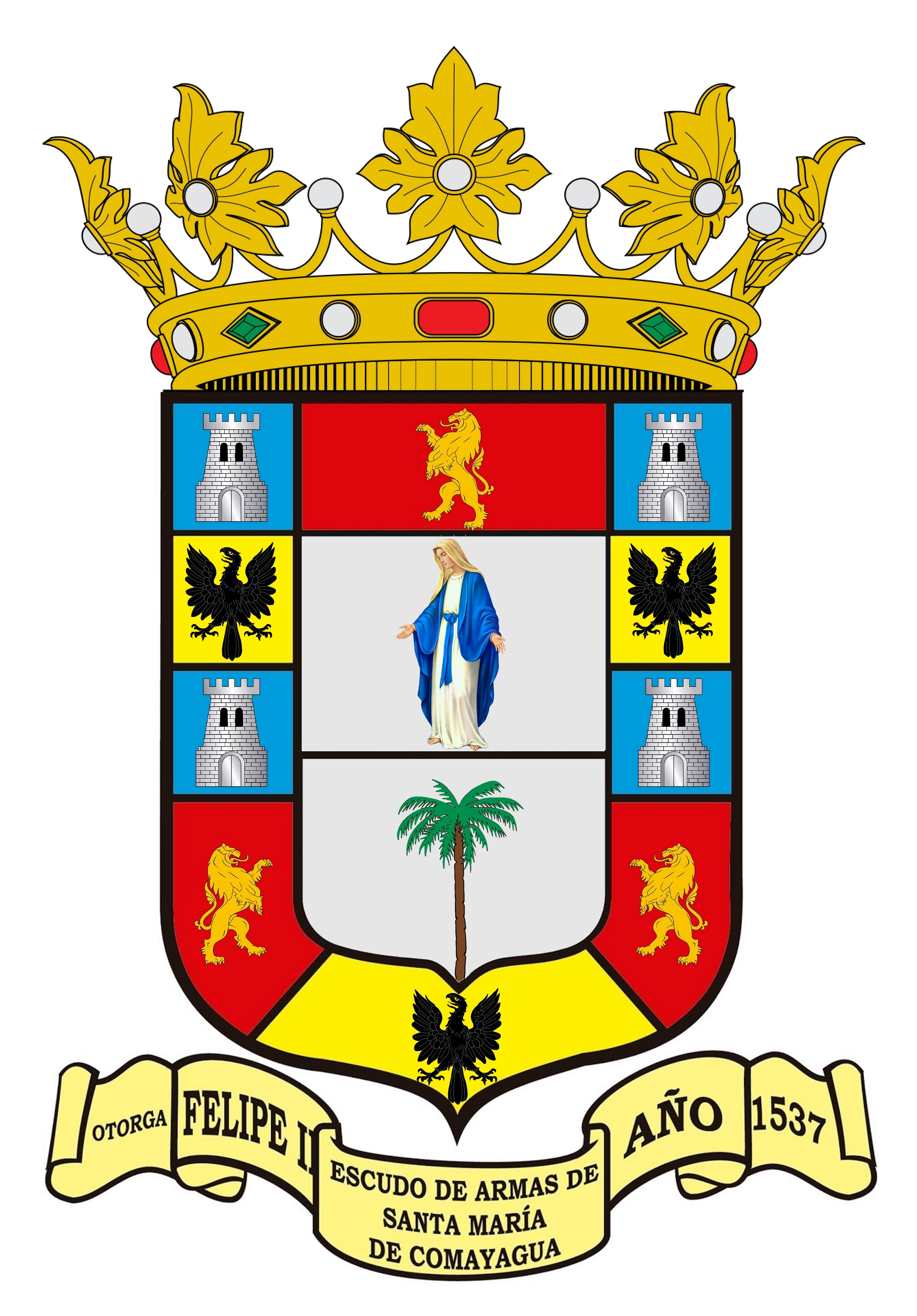
- Flag Seal

- Location within Honduras
- Coordinates: 14°27′08″N 87°38′18″W
- Country: Honduras
- Department: Comayagua Department
- Foundation: 8 December 1537; 488 years ago
- Nearby Large Cities: List: Tegucigalpa 60.5 km (37.6 mi); San Pedro Sula 124.9 km (77.6 mi); San Salvador 193.0 km (119.9 mi)

Government
  - Alcalde: Carlos Miranda

Area
  - Municipality: 834 km^{2} (322 sq mi)
- Elevation: 594 m (1,949 ft)

Population (2023 projection)
  - Municipality: 184,694 (5th in Honduras)
  - Density: 221/km^{2} (574/sq mi)
  - Urban: 127,018
- Time zone: UTC-6 (CST)
- Website: comayagua.hn

Comayagua (Spanish pronunciation: [komaˈʝaɣwa]) is a city, municipality and old capital of Honduras, located 80 km (50 mi) northwest of Tegucigalpa on the highway to San Pedro Sula and 594 m (1,949 ft) above sea level.

The accelerated growth experienced by the city of Comayagua led the municipal authorities to structure a territorial reorganization plan. Between the years of 1945 -1975 the population of the city quadrupled due to the high rate of population growth achieved at that time (4.8%) and to migratory movements in the interior of the country. In 2023 the estimated population of the city was 120,500. It is the capital of the Comayagua department of Honduras and it is noted for its wealth of Spanish Colonial architecture. The cathedral, at the central square of the city, has the oldest clock in the Americas.

== Etymology ==
Comayagua is known today as "La Antañona" (transl. 'the old one') by Hondurans. They call it that because in addition to being one of the oldest cities in Honduras, it still maintains a large part of its buildings with architectural value from the colonial era. Its historic center "is the most restored and preserved nationwide."

The Spaniards named the place "Valladolid" or "País de las Higueras" (transl. 'country of the fig trees'), but the city formally kept the original, indigenous name of the place. Some differ over its etymology, but most agree that it is composed of koma (which in Lenca means 'huge amount of land') and jawa 'water', its true meaning being 'abundant land of water'.

== History ==
=== Pre-Columbian era ===
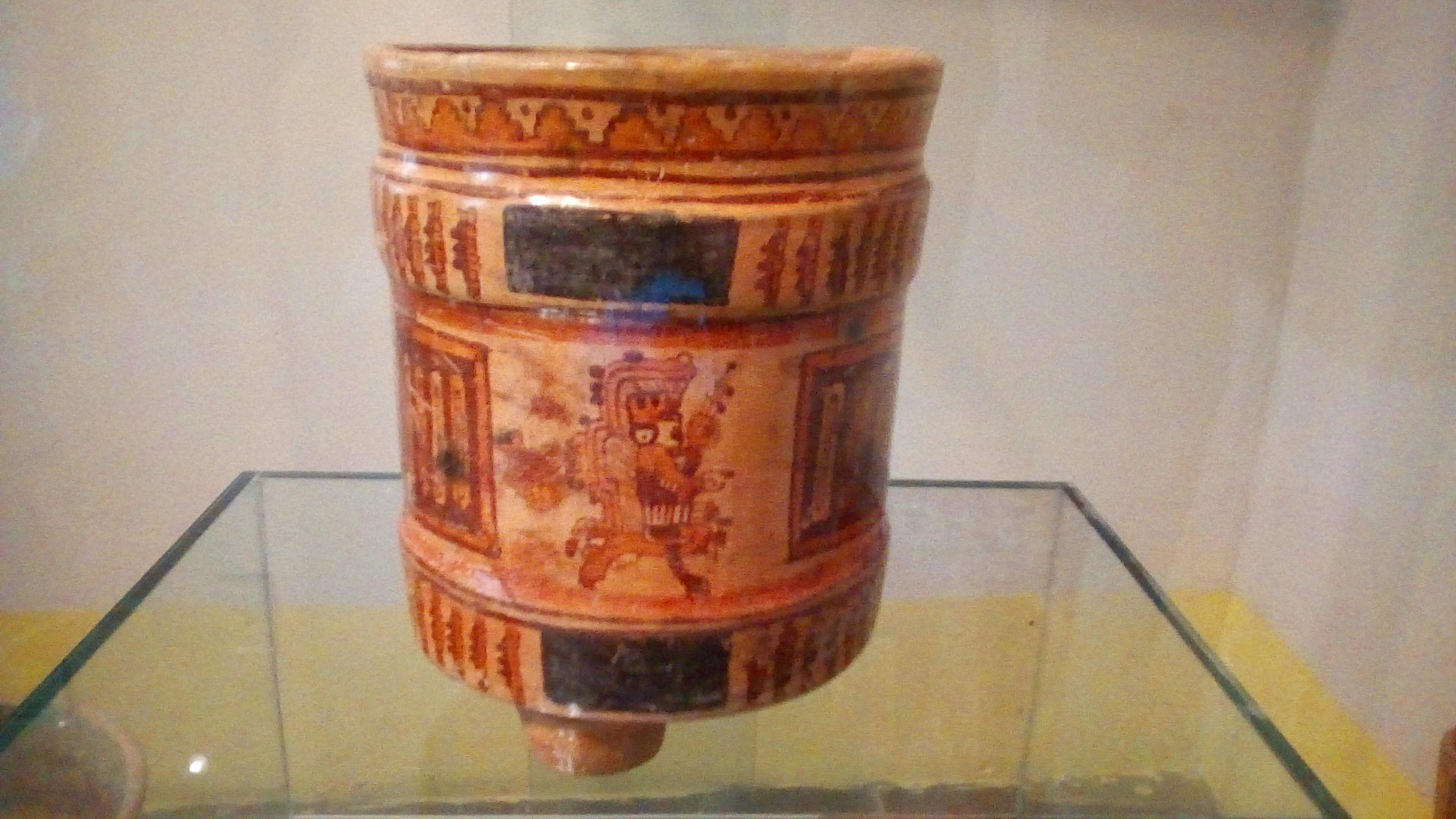
Lencan pottery from the Mesomerican classic period.

During the Pre-Columbian era the valley in which the city is located was populated by Lenca people, an indigenous Mesoamerican culture that still survives in Honduras. Archaeological remains such as Yarumela and Tenampúa show that these natives have populated the valley since approximately 1,000 B.C.

The flat topography and subtropical climate helped these natives to prosper and built its own societies and towns, most of its economic activities were the control of trade routes that connected the Caribbean sea to the Pacific Ocean. During the colonization of the American continent the Spaniard conquistadors found a rich valley with different Lencan towns, most of them well organized with a high social stratification. these natives were the ones that gave a well-done resistance during the conquest of Honduras.

=== Foundation ===
The city was founded in 1537 by the Spaniard Captain Alonso de Cáceres in compliance with instructions "to find an apparent situation to form a city in the middle of the two oceans" by order of the advance Francisco de Montejo, first governor of Hibueras (modern day Honduras) as it was first known to Honduras. The city was originally called "Santa María de la Concepción de Comayagua."

On 20 November 1542, King Philip II of Spain ordered that the Real Audiencia de los Confines reside in Santiago de los Caballeros de Guatemala, but the Council of the Indies ordered on 13 September 1543 to install its headquarters in the town of the Concepción de Comayagua. In the same provision it is given the name of "Villa de la Nueva Valladolid de Comayagua" in honor of Valladolid of Spain, where at the time of signing the founding letter of the hearing, the Court resided.

Finally, the assignment as the seat of the audience was not effective and it was transferred to the town of Gracias Lempira, on 16 May 1544. On 20 December 1557, King Philip II granted it the title of city. At that time, the city already had a Mercedarian convent founded by Fray Jerónimo Clemente in 1553 and a stone church built in 1551 at a cost of 15,000 gold pesos. In 1558 the first capitulars were elected. In 1561, the episcopal chair that resided in Trujillo was transferred to it, due to its more favorable conditions, its location in the center of the country and its proximity to the gold and silver mining regions. In 1585 the first cathedral was built; and the one that now exists (Immaculate Conception) began in 1634, and was completed in 1715.

=== Spanish colonial period ===
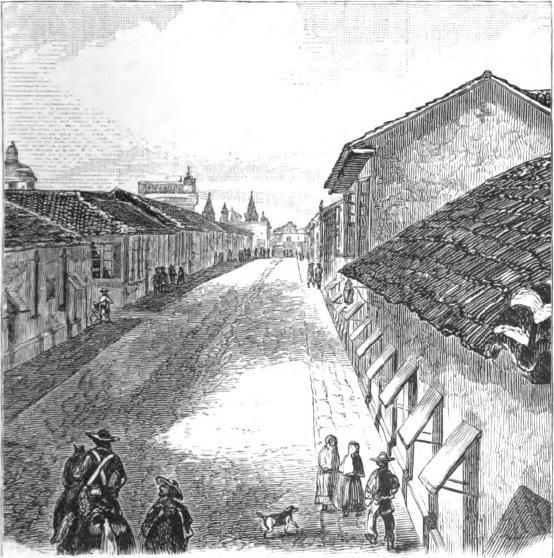
Comayagua was the capital of Honduras during the Colonial period, and became one of the most important cities of Central America in New Spain.

Comayagua remained the capital of Honduras throughout all the colonial period. By the time the Spanish authorities gifted the city with different architectural works, such as churches, colleges, convents, houses, and Fountains. Comayagua's system of cisterns and fountains dates from colonial times making it the first city in Honduras with a system of aqueducts. However Tegucigalpa began to dispute that position in the mid-17th century, as it developed as a mining center. In recognition of its growing importance it received the title of town in 1768.

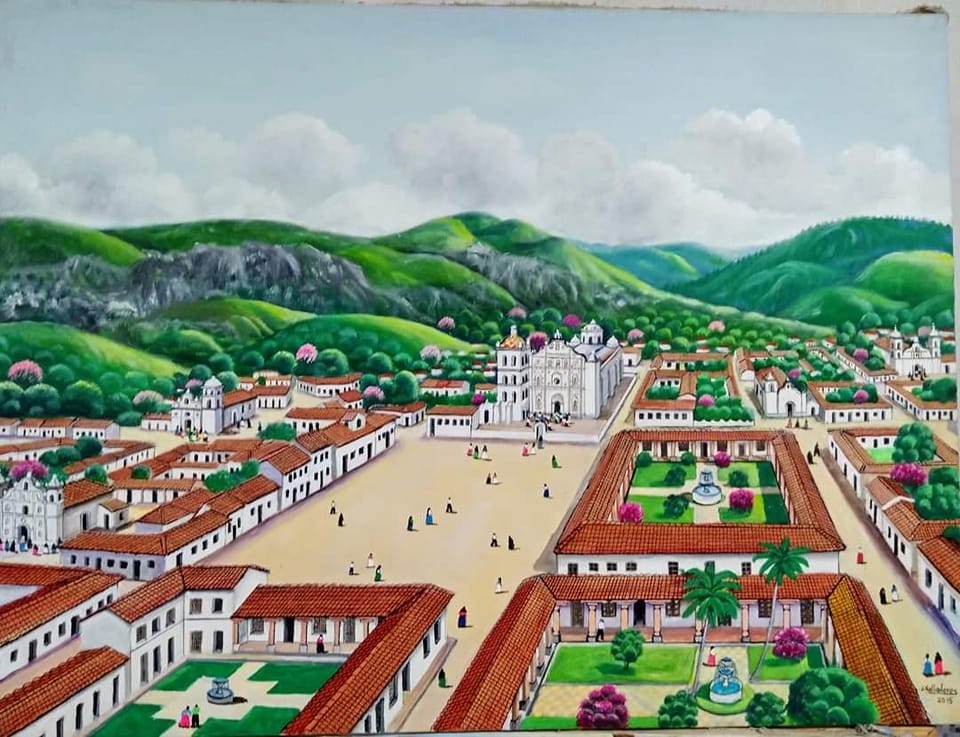
A recreation of the city during the 18th century, several buildings that have disappeared today are shown.

However, the development of Tegucigalpa was ignored when in 1788: "Comayagua became an Intendancy and politically absorbed Tegucigalpa which became a sub-delegation" ... "Even so, the appointment was made from Comayagua, which caused a revolt in Tegucigalpa, fueling the existing rivalry between the two most important cities of the Province. Some resentful Tegucigalpans a few years later, complained that these decisions had resulted in the economic decline of the area, "claiming that the new mayors were not interested in the development of mining and that they established a local tax on agricultural products such as indigo, sugar, and cattle, which only benefited Comayagua.

As a result of the complaints presented by the residents of Tegucigalpa and on the recommendation of José Cecilio del Valle, advisor to the president of the Guatemalan hearing, the Mayor's Office was re-created in 1812. The establishment of the intendancy in Comayagua not only delayed the growth of Tegucigalpa, but could not contain the continued decline of Comayagua. It became from the capital of the province, to a sleepy town that, by the early nineteenth century, had only a few Spaniards, near 30 European families, all reduced to living off charity. Furthermore, the city had earned a reputation for being unhealthy because of its economic decline.

"The reason given for the decline of the city was the decline in agriculture and commerce, which was often attributed to the laziness of the natives. In 1802 the two parishes of the city had a combined population of 5,369." For all these reasons it was proposed that the capital be moved to Tegucigalpa. Despite these proposals, the capital remained in Comayagua throughout the colonial period.

=== Independence ===
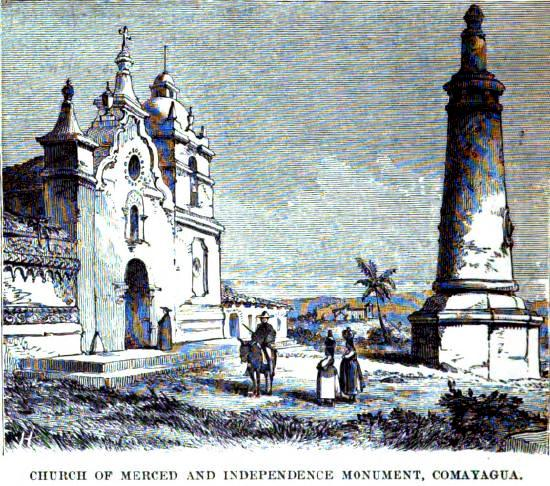
The plaza of la Merced after the independence from the Spanish Empire in 1821, the monument in the lithography was built after the constitution of Cadiz.

During the period close to independence, there were several pro-independence movements throughout Central America. In Honduras these movements took place in Tegucigalpa. Names like Miguel Bustamante, Matías Zuniga, Simón Gutiérrez, Pablo Borjas, Andrés Lozano, Diego Vijil, Dionisio de Herrera, and Francisco Morazán etc. appear on the list of people related to the pro-independence movement. "Those patriots Tegucigalpenses were considered by the Comayagua authority as conspirators," trying to "promote from Tegucigalpa the ideas contrary to the colonial regime."

The Comayagua authorities wanted to quell the pro-independence revolts, but the colonial regime had already died. On September 21, 1821, Central America proclaimed its independence from Spain. Comayagua received the documents in the early hours of the morning of September 28 and the government with the members of the council learned of the decision, accepting independence.

On November 28, 1821, a note from General Agustín de Iturbide reached Guatemala suggesting that Central America, and the Viceroyalty of Mexico, form a great empire under the Plan of Iguala and the Treaties of Córdoba. The issue of annexation to Mexico caused divisions within each of the provinces since some cities were in favor of it and others against it.

In Honduras, Comayagua – through its governor José Tinoco de Contreras – spoke out in favor of annexation; but Tegucigalpa, the second largest city in the province, opposed the idea of it. In the end, Iturbide's annexationist proposal triumphed and on August 22, 1822, Central America joined Mexico. Agustín de Iturbide's annexation to the Mexican Empire did not last long, because it abdicated on March 19, 1823, and on July 1 of that same year, Central America proclaimed its definitive independence. Comayagua and Honduras became part of the United Provinces of Central America.

=== Burning of the city ===
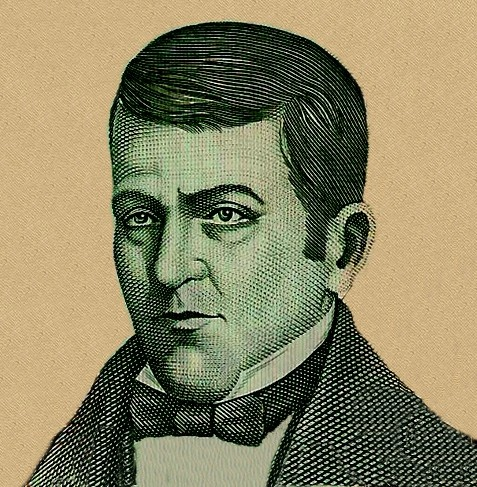
Dionisio de Herrera was the first head of state of Honduras.

After Honduras became part of the United Provinces of Central America, Comayagua continued to be its capital. In 1824, Honduras elected Don Dionisio de Herrera as its first Head of State. Soon the reaction arose against him, led by the Vicar, Canon José Nicolás Irías Midence, with the support of the President of the Republic, General Manuel José Arce, who, having already entered the path of arbitrariness, he saw Herrera as a serious obstacle to the development of his plans.

"Irías, promoted anarchy as much as he could and finally caused the invasion of Honduras. President Arce, under the pretext of guarding the cigars belonging to the Federation, stored in the Villa de Santa Rosa, sent his federal forces under the command of Colonel Justo Milla, with the purpose of overthrowing Dionisio de Herrera. Without further ado, Milla's troops reached Comayagua and laid siege to it. This happened on April 4, 1827. Comayagua was burned and looted to a large extent, and although the forces with which it was defending were inferior in number to those of the invader, they would have triumphed if their Commander, Colonel Antonio Fernández, a Spaniard, had not betrayed Mr. Herrera, putting him in prison and understanding with Colonel Milla, with whom he settled a capitulation on May 9, by virtue of which he delivered the square and the person of the Chief. "Mr. Herrera was taken to Guatemala, where he should have been submitted to the Assembly to declare whether or not his conduct gave rise to the formation of a cause. But since he was not accused of arbitrariness, and President Arce, in making war on him I did not have my sights other than to separate him from the Government of Honduras to organize it according to his interests, which he had already achieved, the President of the Republic did not worry about that, and kept the prisoner in his own house. Justo Milla temporarily took command of the province of Honduras; because on November 11, 1827, it was defeated by the forces of General Francisco Morazán in the battle of La Trinidad. Later, Morazán marched to Comayagua where he took command of the state of Honduras from the hands of Miguel Eusebio Bustamante. In June 1828, Morazán handed over command to Diego Vigil.

=== Transfer of the capital ===
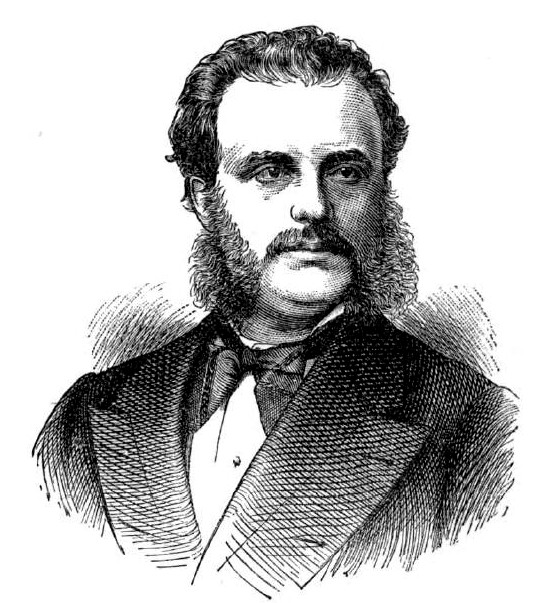
Marco Aurelio Soto was the President that moved the capital to Tegucigalpa.

«That rivalry between the radical Comayagua and the liberal Tegucigalpa became more and more accentuated every day and was notorious at the time of independence and in the consolidation of the State from 1825, when the first Constitution was issued. The ideas of alternating the capital on an annual basis began then as a political approach that arose in the Cedros mineral, an intention that only remained in that. »15

In June 1849, while Dr. Juan Lindo of the Constituent Assembly chaired by Don Felipe Jáuregui was president of Honduras, he issued a decree transferring the capital to Tegucigalpa, but it was not executed due to legal inconsistencies and Comayagua continued to be the seat of state powers.

Through the eighteenth century, Tegucigalpa was taking advantage of Comayagua; Several buildings of important institutions were erected there such as "the Literary Academy, the genesis of the current National Autonomous University of Honduras." 15 Finally, on 30 October 1880, President Marco Aurelio Soto made the "decision to transfer the capital of Honduras from Comayagua to Tegucigalpa Dr. Marco Aurelio Soto Martínez, for economic or social reasons, picked up luggage and moved to his hometown thus ending that antagonism "between the two cities.

After the transfer of the capital to Tegucigalpa, the population, commerce, and importance of Comayagua was notably reduced. At the beginning of the 19th century, its narrow and irregular streets were poorly paved. Also, public buildings were in poor condition. However, this city continued to be the seat of the diocese of Honduras.

== Geography ==
A mountainous system surrounds the valley in which the city of Comayagua is located; where the main mountains are: Mountains of Montecillos, are to the west of La Paz. The mountains of Comayagua to the east of the department that join the mountains of Esquías, extending to Minas de Oro. To the south are the branches of Lepaterique, Mulacagua and Pototerique.

=== Climate ===
Comayagua has a tropical savanna climate (Aw) under the Köppen climate classification.

Climate data for Comayagua (Comayagua International Airport) 2016–present
Month	Jan	Feb	Mar	Apr	May	Jun	Jul	Aug	Sep	Oct	Nov	Dec	Year
Record high °C (°F)	36.0 (96.8)	36.1 (97.0)	36.2 (97.2)	36.4 (97.5)	36.7 (98.1)	34.6 (94.3)	33.5 (92.3)	33.1 (91.6)	33.3 (91.9)	32.6 (90.7)	32.3 (90.1)	32.0 (89.6)	36.7 (98.1)
Mean daily maximum °C (°F)	30.8 (87.4)	32.9 (91.2)	34.9 (94.8)	34.9 (94.8)	34.7 (94.5)	32.1 (89.8)	30.0 (86.0)	30.0 (86.0)	29.0 (84.2)	29.5 (85.1)	29.9 (85.8)	30.2 (86.4)	30.8 (87.4)
Daily mean °C (°F)	22.8 (73.0)	23.6 (74.5)	24.2 (75.6)	25.0 (77.0)	24.6 (76.3)	23.9 (75.0)	23.5 (74.3)	23.5 (74.3)	23.3 (73.9)	22.3 (72.1)	22.0 (71.6)	22.8 (73.0)	22.1 (71.8)
Mean daily minimum °C (°F)	15.9 (60.6)	17.6 (63.7)	18.4 (65.1)	19.8 (67.6)	20.4 (68.7)	19.0 (66.2)	19.5 (67.1)	19.7 (67.5)	19.6 (67.3)	19.3 (66.7)	14.4 (57.9)	14.2 (57.6)	18.2 (64.7)
Record low °C (°F)	8.9 (48.0)	11.0 (51.8)	13.0 (55.4)	12.0 (53.6)	12.0 (53.6)	15.5 (59.9)	13.5 (56.3)	12.2 (54.0)	15.0 (59.0)	12.5 (54.5)	10.1 (50.2)	12.0 (53.6)	8.9 (48.0)
Average rainfall mm (inches)	3.8 (0.15)	4.9 (0.19)	5.9 (0.23)	18.7 (0.74)	80 (3.1)	120 (4.7)	150 (5.9)	250 (9.8)	256 (10.1)	108 (4.3)	79 (3.1)	45 (1.8)	1,121.3 (44.11)
Average rainy days (≥ 0.1 mm)	1	1	1	5	13	20	20	20	20	16	4	2	123
Average relative humidity (%)	55	56	56	60	67	68	82	83	86	83	76	72	70
Source: Climatedata.org

== Places of note ==
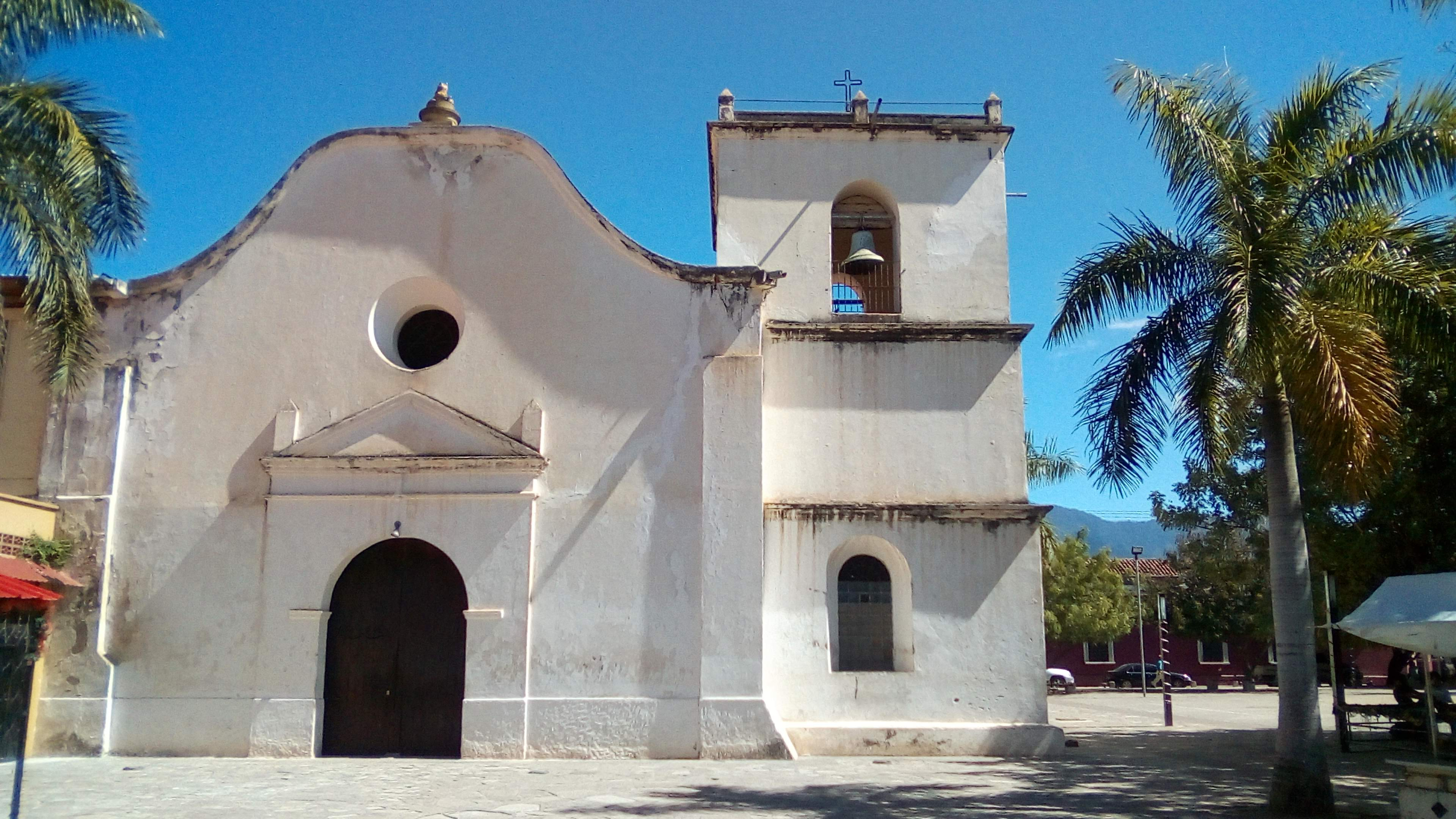
The San Francisco church was built in 1560 as part of the Franciscan Convent of the city, today is one of the oldest churches in Honduras.

Right in front of the plaza is located City Hall, which has been reconstructed a couple of times. The building is of neoclassic style and was built during the 19th century. The Cathedral de la inmaculada concepcion of Comayagua was built during the colonial era in Honduras. It was inaugurated on 8 December 1711. In the cathedral there is also the oldest clock in America, built by the Arabs during their occupation in Spain around the year 1100. It was moved in the colonial period as a gift from King Carlos III. Another attraction is the Plaza de San Francisco, which has a park, the colonial church and is located a few meters from the main square, this church possesses the Antonina Bell, is the oldest bell in America, being cast in Alcalá de Henares, Spain in 1460.

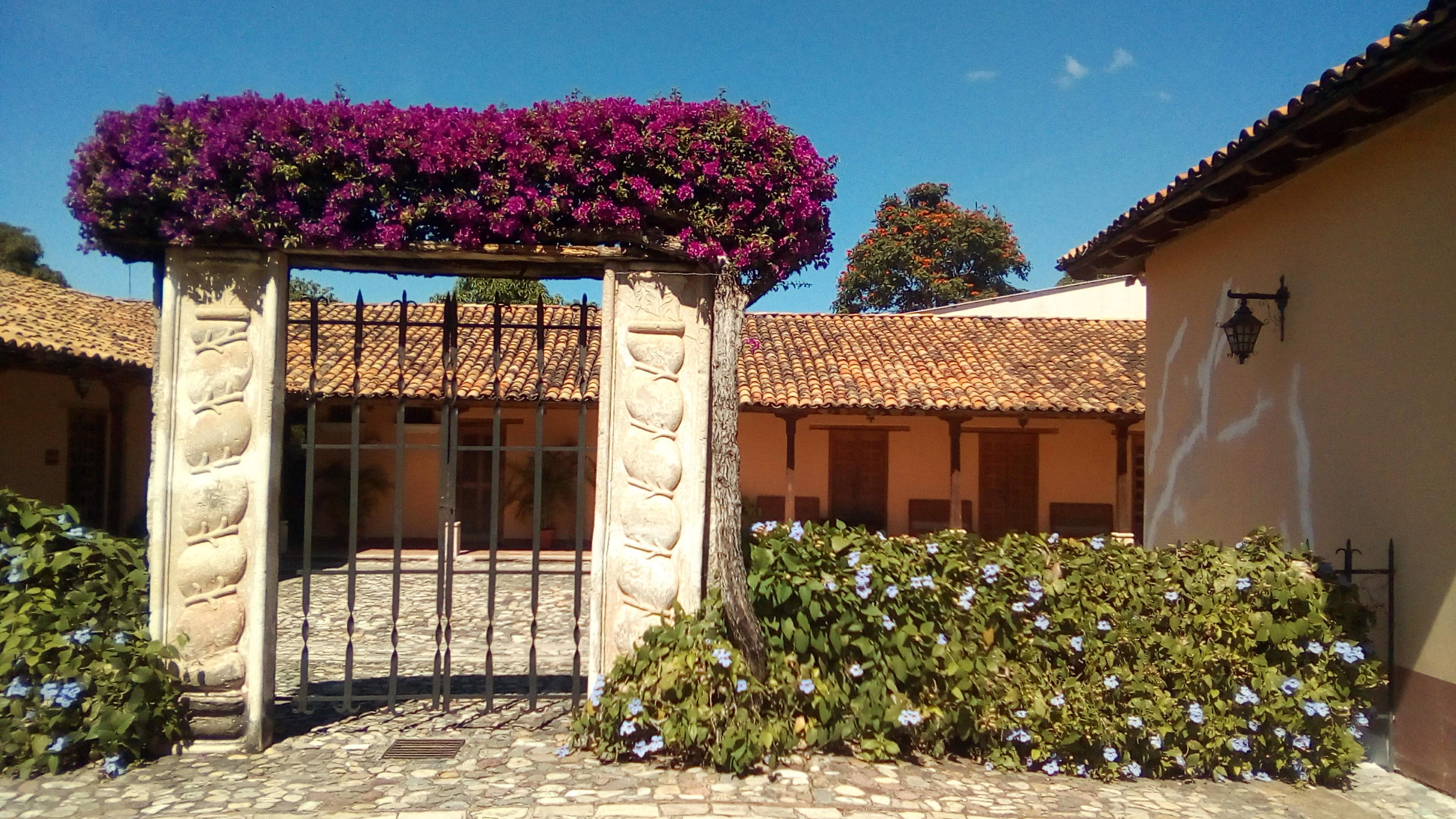
Archeological Museum of Comayagua. The building shows the architecture of the Spaniard criollo houses in New Spain.

The houses of the city still preserve their original Spanish colonial architecture from the 18th century, many of them have been turned into museums. The most important examples are the museum of colonial religious art, the archeological museum that contains relics of the Lenca people of the pre-Hispanic era, and the republican museum. Another square in the old town is the Plaza de la Merced, it is known for having a monument known as the obelisk and in front of it is the Iglesia de la Merced. Which was the first cathedral of the city before the current one was completed in 1711.

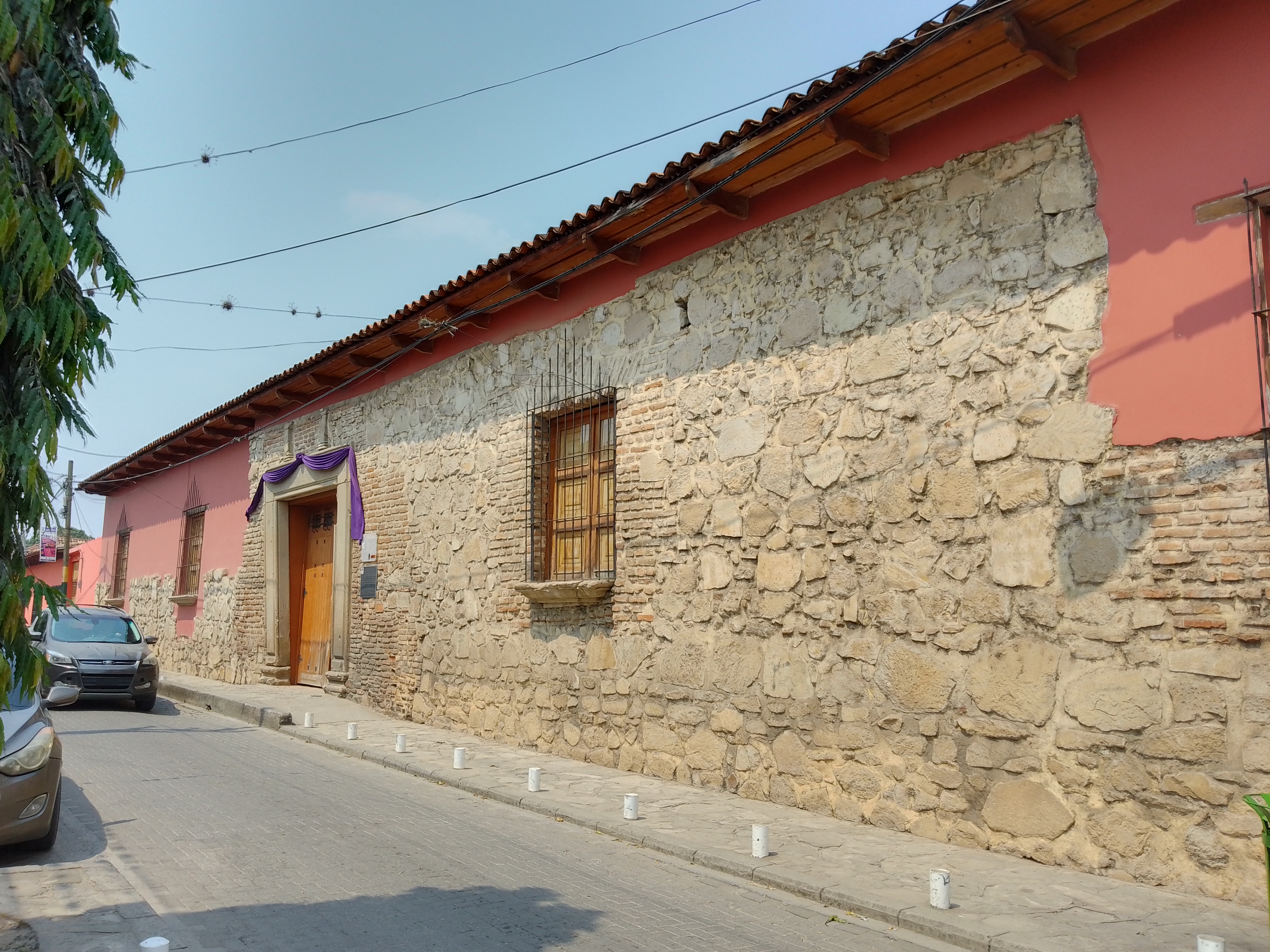
The Caxa Real, old Spanish warehouse.

Another attraction is the Caxa real, a colonial house that was built between 1739 and 1741 and developed by the Spanish architect Bartolomé de Maradiaga as a center where the tributes for the Spanish crown were stored, within it Gold, silver and plaster extracted from the mines of Honduras were processed, to later be shipped to Europe. On the ground floor of the building, introduce some elements that were not in common use in Central American architecture; It makes a very good difference between the purely official area, the Courtroom, the Accounting Office, the Treasury, the Azogues room,

the piece of fifth silver; This sector was entered through a large hall called by the men on horseback and which were on the street that the Chiquito River rises to the Plaza Mayor. In 1774, an earthquake that caused serious damage to the structure, however, was repaired within a few months, although the house was weaker. In 1809 another earthquake damaged the building.

It was rebuilt in 2013 and is currently an events center that has hosted important international political figures, such as Queen Leticia of Spain, and the former President of Mexico Enrique Peña Nieto on his visit to Honduras. The Plaza de San Francisco is another place of note, located a few meters from the cathedral and has one of the oldest churches in Honduras built in the mid-16th century by Bishop Fray Alonso de la Cerda and it was the second church built in Comayagua, being the second oldest in the city. The church has five bells, one of which, all imported from Spain.

== Patrimony ==
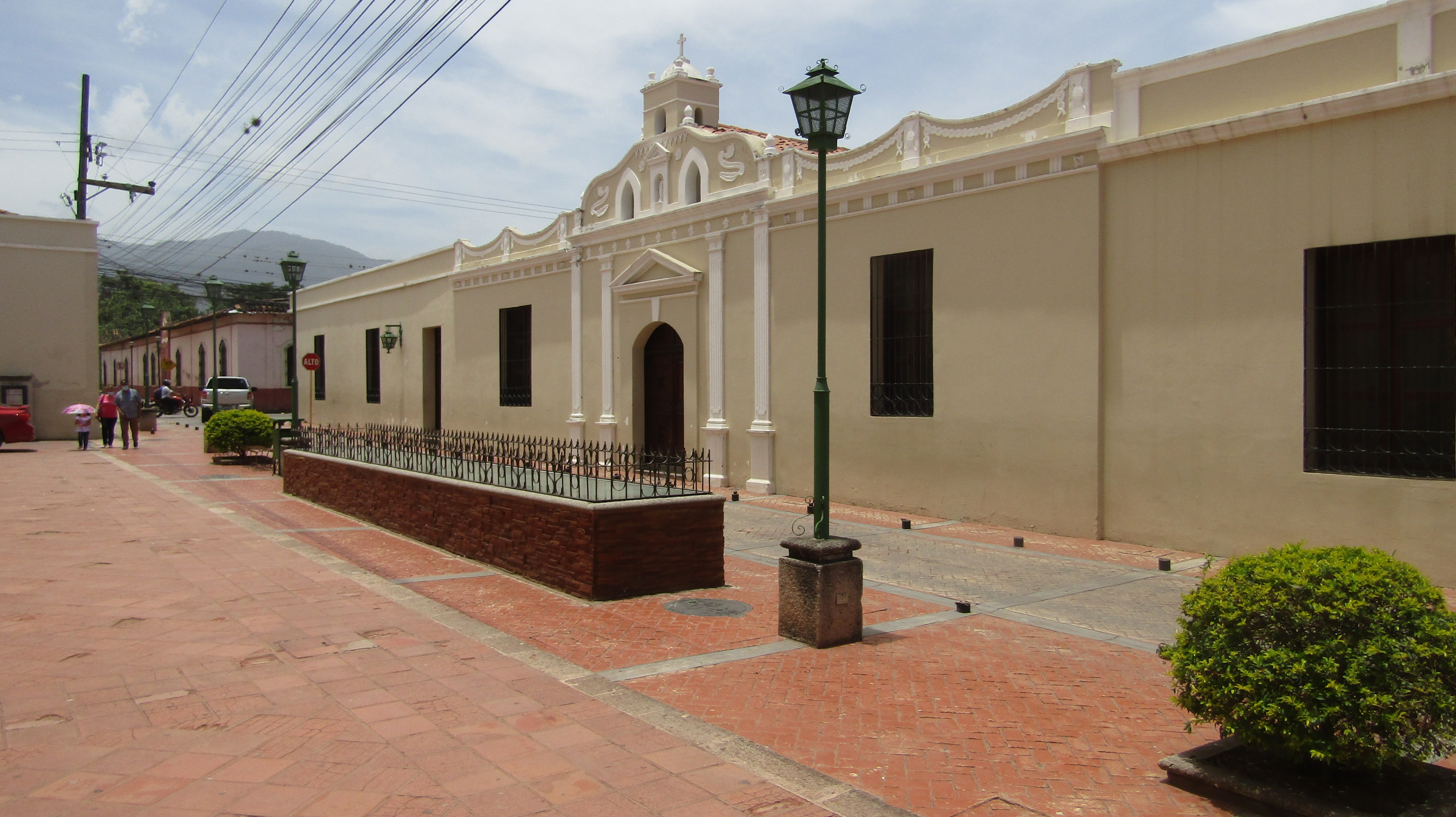
The episcopal palace that now works as a museum, was also known as the San Agustin College.

Comayagua has a huge architectural, cultural, and artistic patrimony. Some of the buildings date from the mid-16th century, and some of these are the oldest in Central America. In culture, the cities of Honduras are some of the few palaces that still practice Spanish traditions the same way as they were introduced.

=== Architectural ===
- La Merced church (1550)
- San Francisco church (1560)
- San Sebastián church (1580)
- La Caridad church (16th century)
- Comayagua archeological museum (House built in the late 16th century)
- Immaculate conception cathedral (1634)
- Religious art museum/San Agustín college (1678)
- Paseo la Alameda (Old criollo houses converted into restaurants)
- Cabañas house museum (18th century house)
- Santos Guardiola house museum (18th century House)
- Caxa Real (1739)
- Cádiz constitution monument (1812)
- Government Palace (1880)

=== Cultural ===
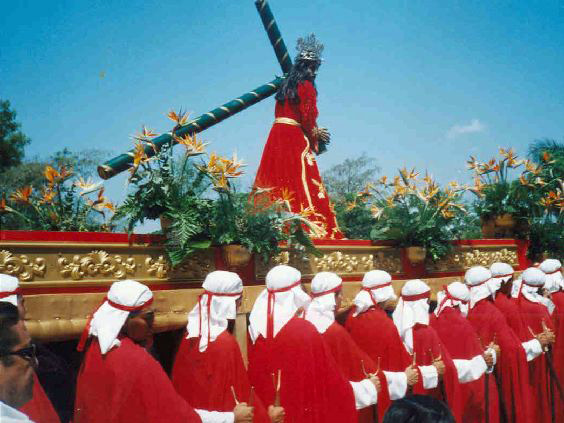
Holy week is perhaps the most notable holiday of the city.

Semana santa (holy week) is a famous Roman Catholic holiday celebrated in Comaygua, it is still practiced in the same Spanish way that was introduced in the 16th century. Every holy week, people make the famous "alfombras de aserrín" or colored carpets from wood dust that represents a part of the life of Jesus of Nazareth and representations of other biblical characters like the Virgin Mary and the Holy spirit. Also, many catholic saints are represented in the carpets like Saint Jude the Apostle. These traditions had their roots in southern Spain and were mostly practiced in Guatemala and Hondurans during the colony. The Honduran Semana santa have been compared to the one celebrated in Andalusia Spain in cities like Seville due to its incredible similarity to the old Spanish catholic tradition taught to the indigenous people.

Other famous traditions of Comayagua are the mixes of indigenous and Spanish elements, like el baile de los diablitos (littles devils dance), where dancers wore colorful clothes and masks that represent something like an animal, a person, or a mythological creature. This tradition has its roots in the 17th century, when indigenous people mixed its religious rituals with the catholic ones.

=== Arts ===
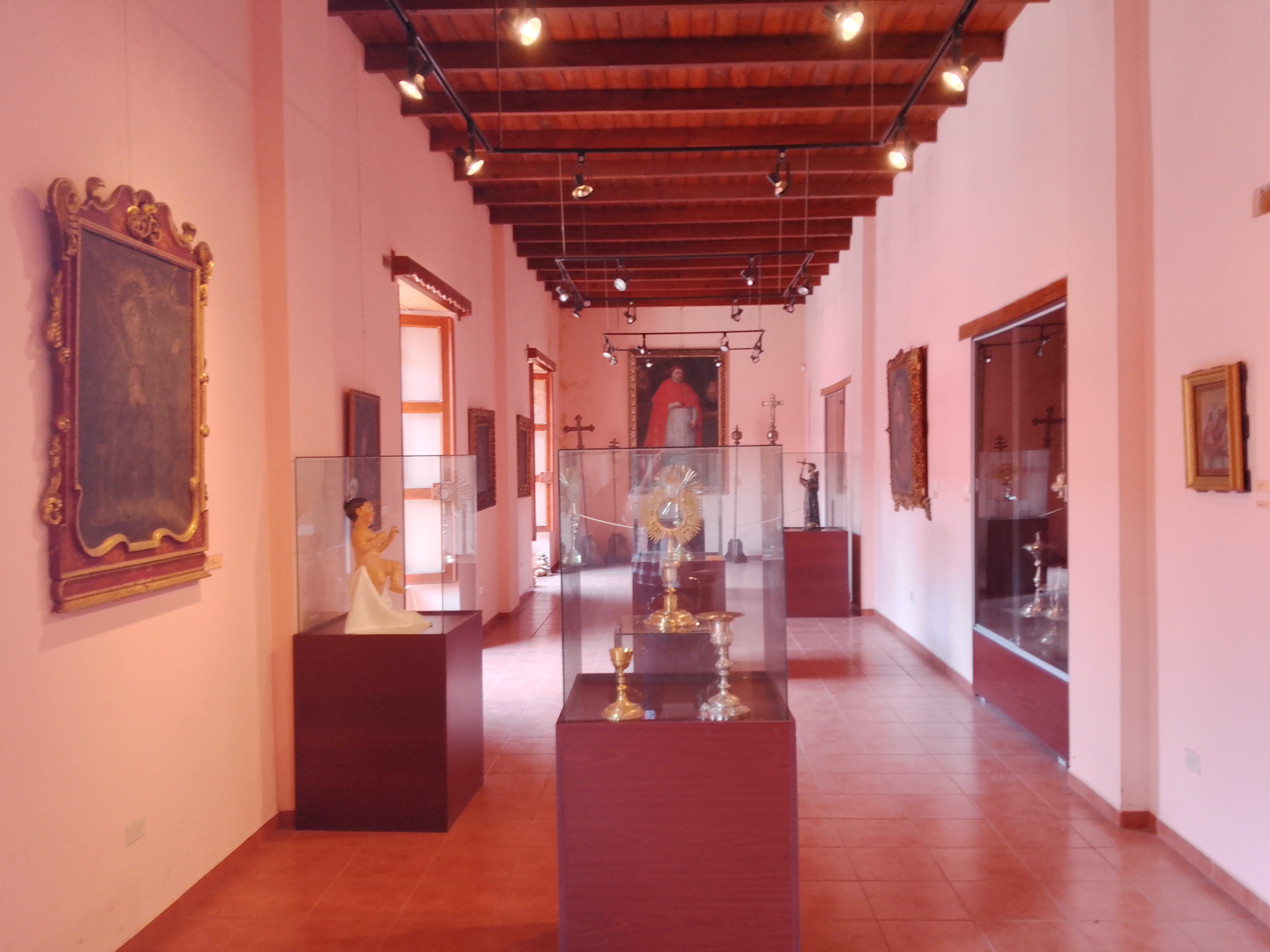
Religious art museum.

Comaygua has pieces of arts that dates from different eras, like the pre-Columbian Lencan art in the pottery exposed in the archeological museum as the pieces of art from the Viceroyalty of New Spain, some of them even dates from the late 16th century. The altarpiece of the Catedral of immaculate conception was made in Jaén Spain in the 17th century.

It is considered one of the most beautiful baroque pieces in Honduras, same as the altarpieces and paintings of the many other churches of the city. Most pieces of art are now preserved in museums of the city like the ones exposed in the museum of religious art. Other arts are the expositions of national painters in the archeological museum which shows the art works of different Hondurans from the entire country.

== Comayagua International Airport ==
The new Comayagua International Airport will be one of the most important airports in the country with a capacity greater than the Toncontin International Airport in Tegucigalpa. This new airport is expected to serve not only Comayagua but also the residents of Tegucigalpa due to the limitations on growth of Toncontin. The new airport could become the main airport for the capital starting from October 2021 especially if there is a partial closure of Toncontin.

The new airport will have a capacity of 20 aircraft and the terminal will have more than 39,000 square metres (420,000 sq ft) built, approximately four times the size of Toncontin in Tegucigalpa. The airport will also have the third longest runway in Honduras after the Ramón Villeda Morales International Airport in San Pedro Sula and the Golosón International Airport in La Ceiba.

== Soto Cano Air base ==
Soto Cano Air Base (formerly Palmerola Air Base) is a Honduran military installation located less than 16 km (10 mi) from Comayagua. The 3 km-wide (2 mi) and 10 km-long (6 mi) airbase is home of the Honduran Air Force Academy. United States maintains Joint Task Force Bravo on Soto Cano Air Base with approximately 550 US military personnel and more than 650 US and Honduran civilians. The airport is also open to civilians as Comayagua International Airport.

== Sport ==
Comayagua is headquarters of Club Hispano, of the Honduran National Soccer League. The club obtained its first promotion to the National League in 2004–05. Nevertheless, after only their first season in the soccer league; they were relegated to second division once again. For this reason, the board of directors, bought the first division franchise from Club Municipal-Valencia of Choluteca. The Club plays its home games at the municipal stadium 'Carlos Miranda' which currently holds about 10,000 spectators.

Comayagua was host to the first International Fellowship of Christian Athletes Motocross camp in September 2012. Sixty men and women participated in the camp which was instructed by professional riders from the United States, Jimmy Povolny, Shawn Clark and Ryan Meyung among others. The camp was followed by a race sponsored by Colmotos Enduro and was in memory of Dylan First, a US rider who lost his life on the track the previous year. This is now an annual event in Comayagua with instructors from the US and leaders from Honduras.

== See also ==
- Comayagua prison fire
- History of Honduras
