= Instituto Hondureño de Antropología e Historia =

Government institution in the republic of Honduras

Instituto Hondureño de Antropología e Historia (IHAH)
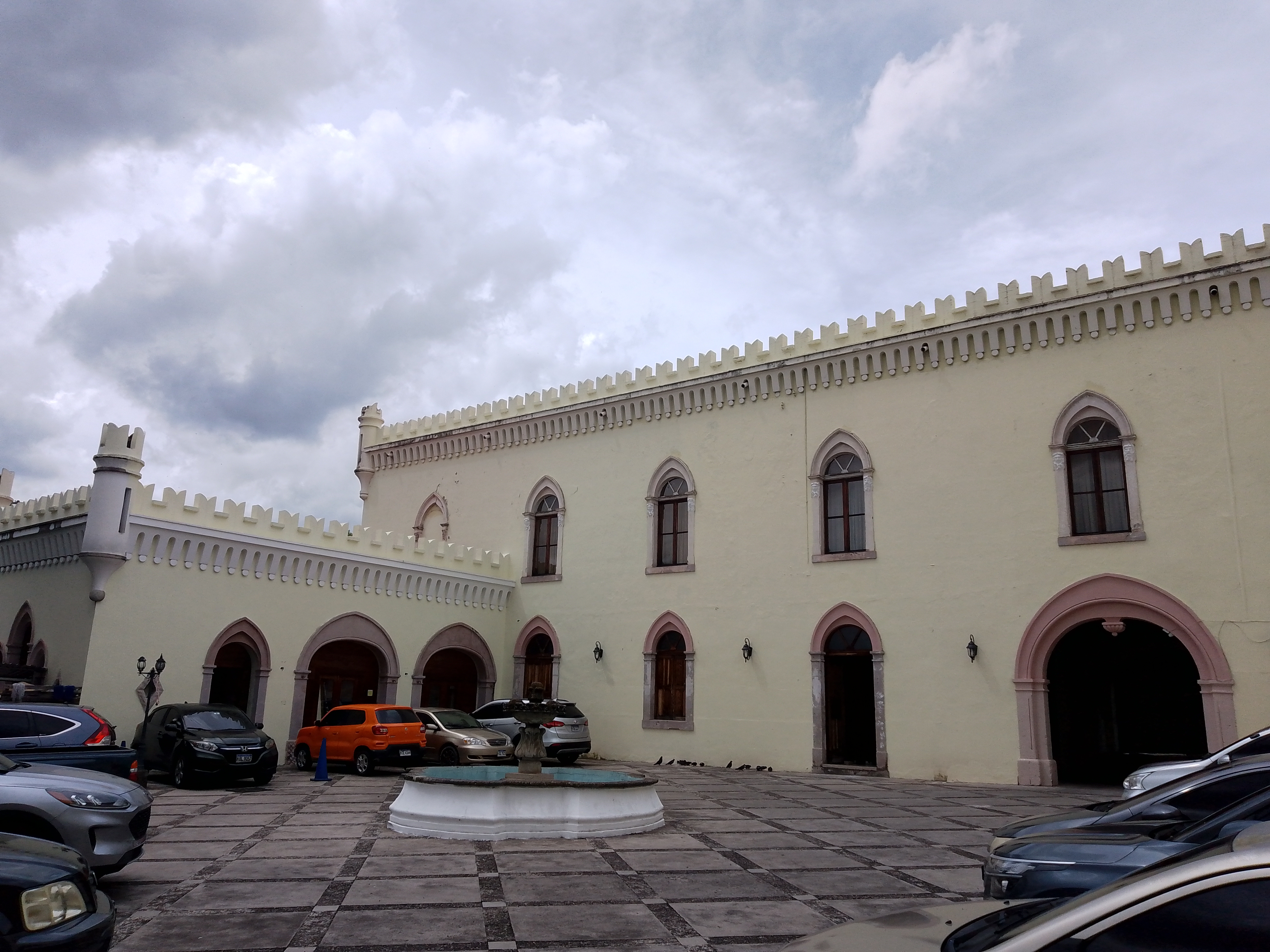

Agency overview
- Formed: July 22, 1952; 74 years ago
- Jurisdiction: Government of Honduras
- Headquarters: Museo Villa Roy, Tegucigalpa; 14°6′45″N 87°12′23″W
- Website: www.ihah.hn

The Instituto Hondureño de Antropología e Historia (IHAH, Honduran Institute of Anthropology and History) is a government institution in the republic of Honduras.

It formed on July 22, 1952, by Decree No. 24 originally under the name of National Institute of Anthropology and History under the government of Dr. Juan Manuel Gálvez.

In 1968, Decree No. 118, changed its name to the Instituto Hondureño de Antropología e Historia , which changed its administrative autonomy, legal personality and own patrimony.

The IHAH has a website, where their publications are available daily.

The Honduran Institute of Anthropology and History has the following departments:

- Department of Anthropological Research (DIA)
- Department of Historical Research
- Department of Museums
- Restoration Department
- Department of Protection of Cultural Heritage
