= Popenoe =

Popenoe is a surname. Notable people with the surname include:

- Dorothy Popenoe (1899–1932), British archaeologist and botanist
- Paul Popenoe (1888–1979), American agricultural explorer and eugenicist
- Wilson Popenoe (1892–1975), American naturalist, brother of Paul
