= Yarumela =

Archaeological site in Honduras

- El Chircal
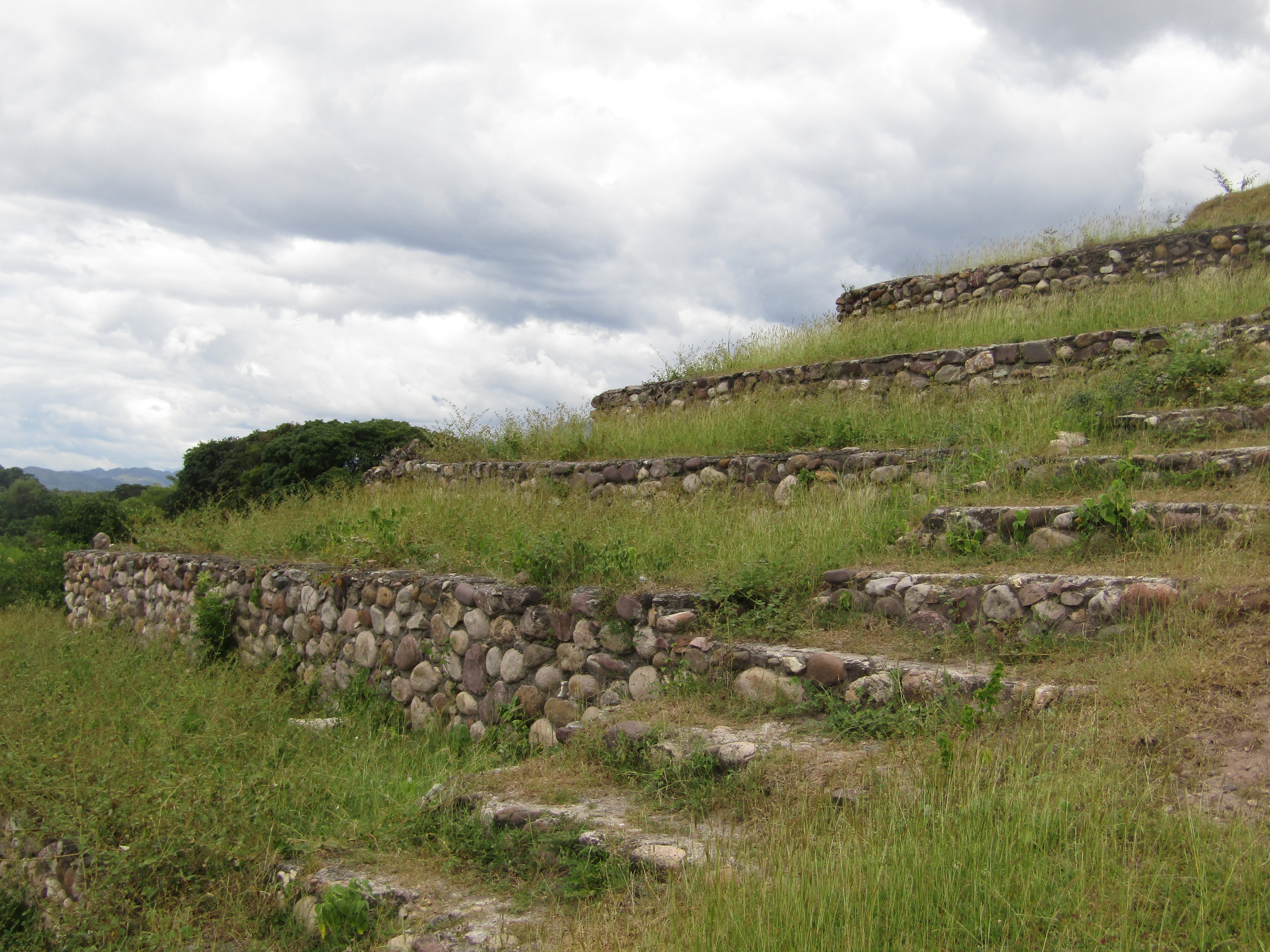

- Location within Honduras
- 14.3636°N 87.6476°W
- Associated with: Lencas
- Location: Comayagua Valley

History
- Built: 600-400 BCE
- Built by: Proto-Lencas
- Abandoned: 250 CE

Yarumela also known as El Chircal, is one of the archeological sites located in Honduras and based around the Middle Formative era in Mesoamerican history, occupied between 1000 BC and AD 250 by the ancestors of the Lencan culture, also known as the Proto-Lencan people. During its heyday at the end of the Preclassic mesoamerican period was a popular trade center, especially for precious commodities.

== Overview ==
Yarumela also called Hiarumela, llarumela, or "El Chilcal", was a Lenca settlement from the Middle Formative period in Mesoamerica, a period that ran from approximately: 900 BC-300BC. The Lenca are an indigenous Mesoamerican people from southwestern Honduras and eastern El Salvador. Yarumela was part of a region that covered around 16,000 square kilometres and shared the region with other archaeological sites such as: La Venta, Los Naranjos, Lo de Vaca and Playa de los Muertos.

== Features of Yarumela ==
Located sixty kilometres south of the Los Naranjos, the site of Yarumela yielded information that led archaeologists to believe that it was another imposing Middle Formative center. This information also led archaeologists to believe that Yarumela as a center had a focus on precious commodities. Much like the settlement found at Los Naranjos, Yarumela's area was protected by the location in which it was found. On the eastern side, the settlement at Yarumela was protected by the Humuya River, which was a branch off of the Ulua, and on the western side it was protected by a large man-made ditch.

The settlement at Yarumela was considered to be a large and prosperous trade center; archaeologists determined this from the numerous large structure mounds they found on the site as well as some of the material artifacts located there as well. Artifacts like shells, jadeite, obsidian fragments as well as exotic ceramics.

== History ==
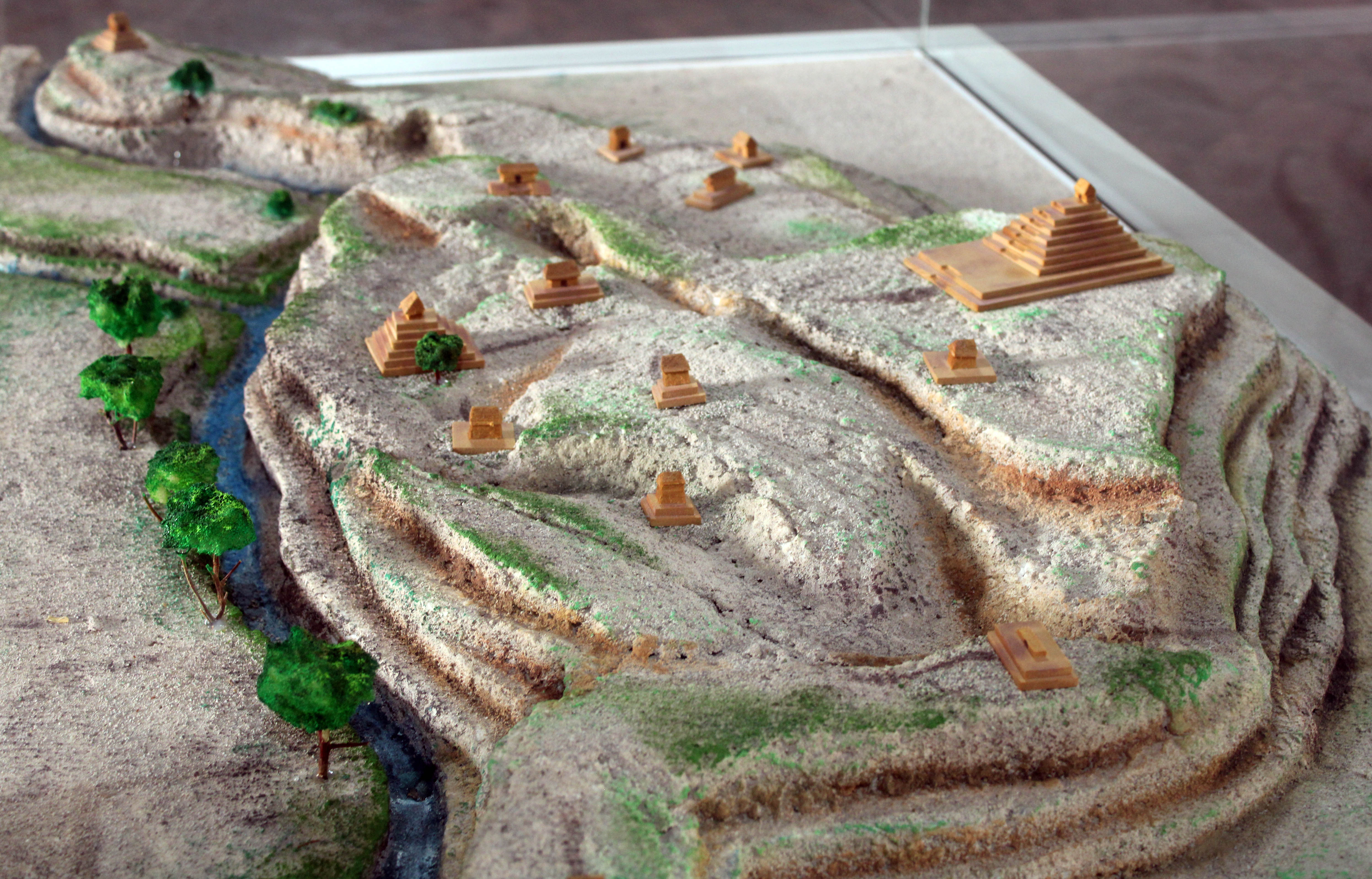
Model of the structures of the city in the museum of Comayagua.

According to the archaeological studies carried out in the area, this settlement was first inhabited approximately 1,000 B.C during the Mesoamerican pre-classic period by the ancestors of the Lenca culture known as the Proto-Lenca. The El Chircal de Yarumela settlement covered approximately 74 acres (30 hectares) of territory in the Comayagua Valley, and due to its location, the site took advantage of its fact of being an important passageway between the Pacific Ocean and the Caribbean Sea.

This was evidenced by the large number of ornamental shells found at the site, the shells that were native to both coastal regions, this together with the amount of Guatemalan jade and other exotic items found by archaeologists at the site location makes the researchers believe that this was the case. In fact, several discoveries indicate that it was a central trade route that connected Mesoamerica with the intermediate zone.

Peak time

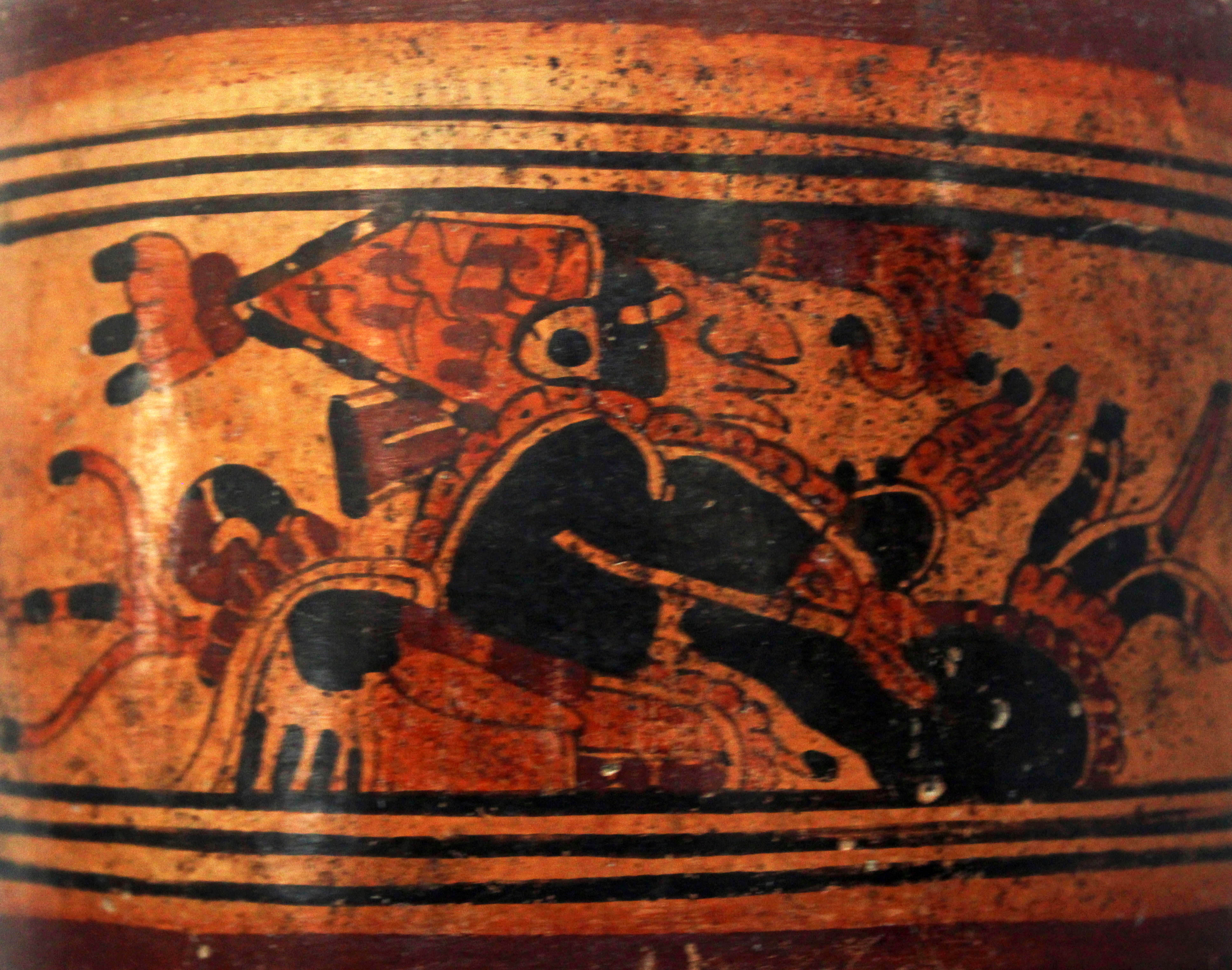
Vessel found at the site depicting someone from the elite.

Over the centuries, thanks to its commercial importance and its wealth, the city would become the capital of a chiefdom later known as Señorío de Yaruma which was founded around 400 B.C thanks to the union of various tribes from both the Valley of Comayagua and other surrounding areas. It is possible that it was during this period that most of the major structures and urbanization projects were carried out, although this is the time when the most visible structures on the site were built. When conforming as capital its estimated population at the end of the pre-classic period was about 6,400 inhabitants. Thus, the Yarumela society began to become a more cosmopolitan city, receiving new settlers who moved in search of being able to better sell their products and by the beginning of the classical period it would end up becoming the most populated city in what is now Honduras by the time.

Although the city was mostly made up of modest merchants due to its constant economic activity in the area and had an active urban life, much is unknown about what its rulers were, since the residents of the Yarumela did not leave written testimonies. Archaeologists could theorize that like every Mesoamerican city it had a good social stratification, with the priestly caste and the nobility at the top. The commercial activity of the city and the arrival of various travelers loaded with their merchandise made it a city full of life and many monuments that reflected its beauty as a result of its wealth.

Decline

Entering the classical period, despite its high population density, the city experienced a decline due to several factors such as the appearance of new important centers, conflicts between different manors and poor harvests, the final blow for the city being an eruption of the San Migel Volcano, whose ashes reached the Comayagua Valley; after this fact several experts point out that it began its absolute abandonment after the last remaining residents decided to completely abandon the center.

== Studies ==
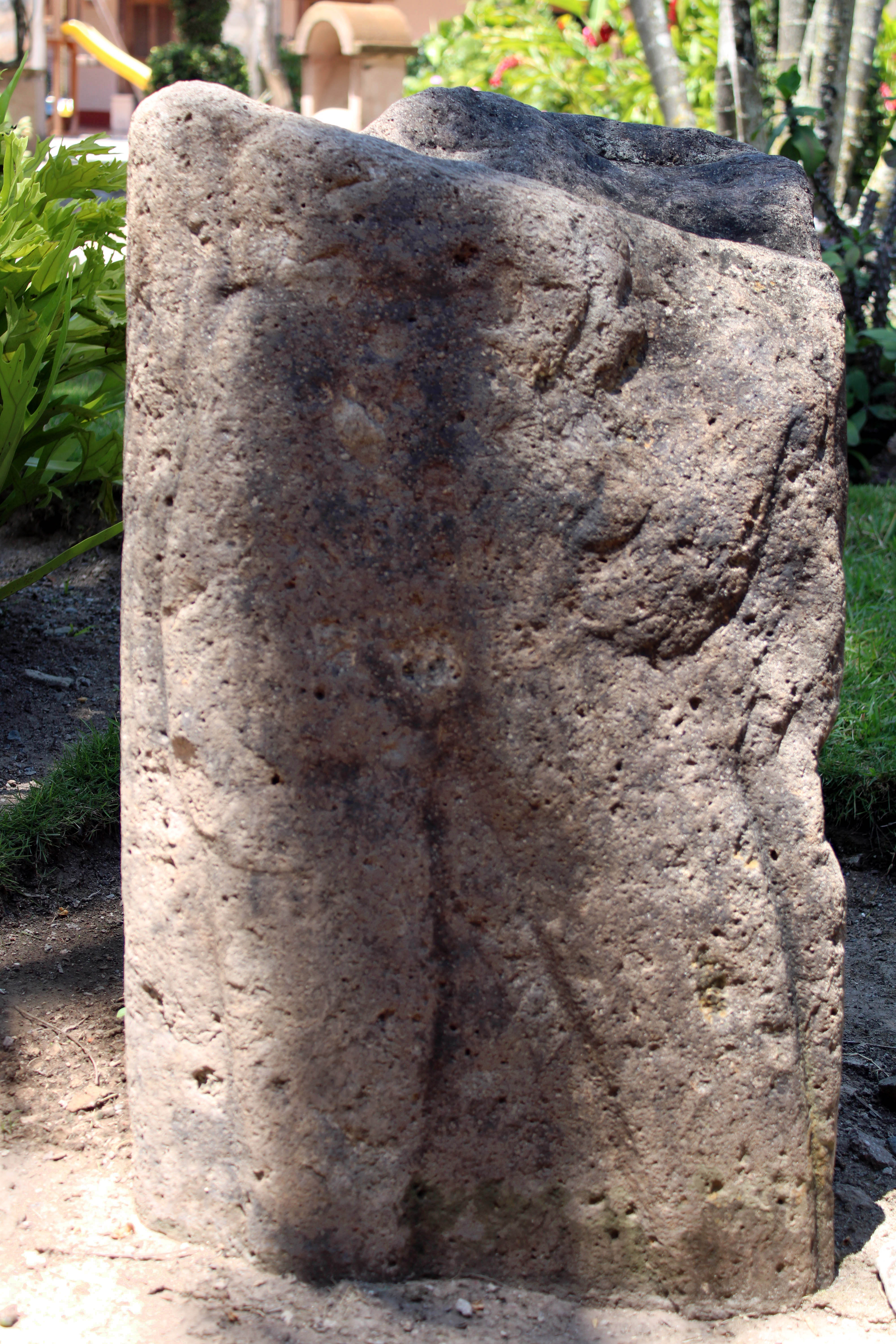
One of the stelae found at the archaeological site, possibly could have represented a ruler. Now exposed in the Museum of Comayagua garden.

The site has been studied since the 19th century, first foreign impressions of the place were collected by Ephraim G. Squier, an American traveler, American diplomat and ethnographer, who visited the area in the to carry out a study of the long-awaited interoceanic railway. Squier. He expressed himself of the structures of Yarumela in the following way: "Of regular, rectangular shapes and placed with scrupulous reference to the cardinal points having been arranged in terraces flights of harrows in the middle of each site still standing fragment of walls with cut stones”.

At the beginning of the 20th century there are brief mentions of Yarumela in two archaeological expeditions: one of them by Samuel K. Lothrop of the Haye Foundation (1926), who carried out excavations in Tenampua (1927), and that of Jens Yde (1935), who led a joint expedition of the Danish museum and the University of tulane. Archaeological investigations in the Comayagua Valley carried out by Doris Stone, an American archaeologist daughter of the Director of United Fruit, managed toraise the importance of the site worldwide.

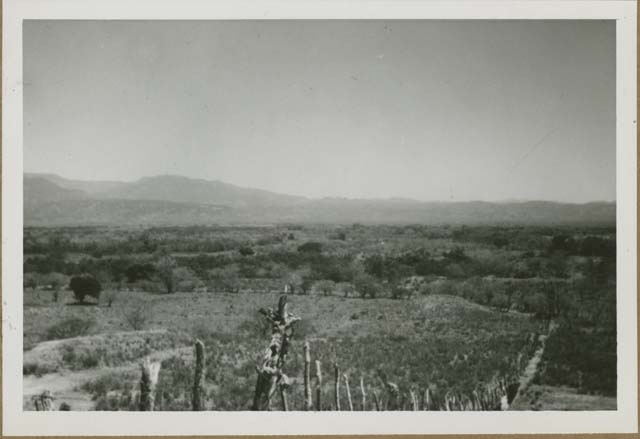
View of the site from the Structure 101 taken by Dr. Lothrop in 1947.

In the 1940s the Vatican's apostolic nuncio to Honduras, Monsignor Federico Lunardi, showed interest in Yarumela. He wrongly attributed the origin of the structures to the Mayans, In the following decades there were mentions of various archaeologists such as Boyd Dixon, who carried out excavations in the area at the end of the 1970s. From the 1980s, large-scale works are carried out. Researchers include Leroy Joesink Mandeville, Boyd Dixon, Carleen Sanchez, among others. Claude Baudez French archaeologist, related Yarumela with ceramic complexes in northern Honduras, specifically with Los Naranjos and Playa de los Muertos.

Craig Goralski, affiliated with the University of Pennsylvania, conducted one of the most comprehensive recent studies on the archaeological site of Yarumela. His doctoral dissertation drew upon the field notes of Claude Mandeville, a late archaeologist who dedicated significant time to research at the site but published very little during his lifetime. Goralski's work is especially valuable as it aims to recover and analyze Mandeville's extensive but largely unpublished field notes. This research holds the potential to provide new insights and a deeper understanding of the structures and historical context of Yarumela, offering a vital contribution to the study of this pre-Columbian site in Honduras.

== Structures ==
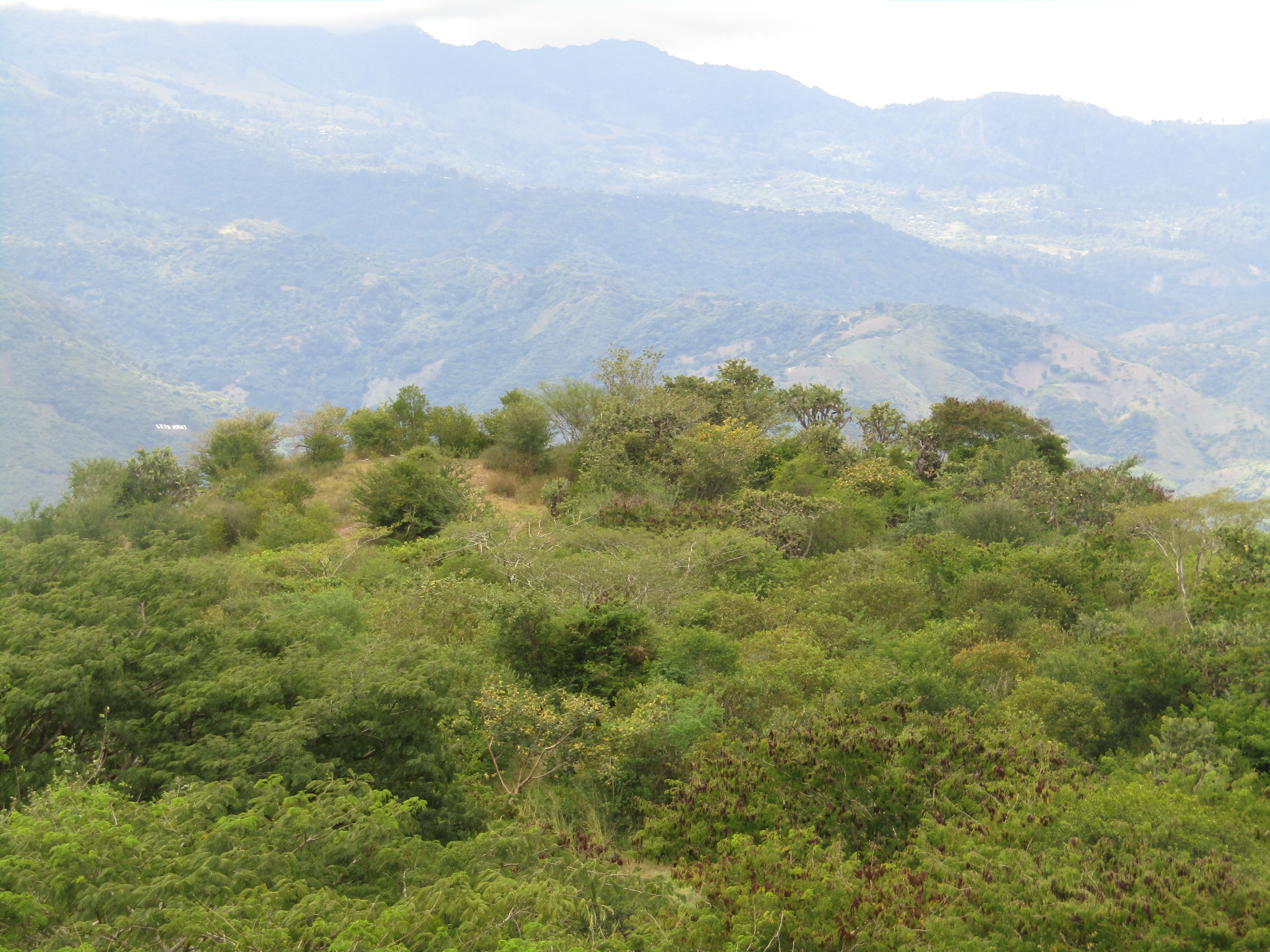
Structure 101 is to date the biggest pyramid found in Honduras; due to its size, it has been confused with a hill.

More than 60 structures have been found on the site, of which only 9 can be seen with the naked eye, most of which have not yet been unearthed. The largest one founded is the Structure 101 also named as "El Cerrito", which reached a height of approximately 20 meters or sixty two feet high. This was determined to be the ‘main mound’ and was located in the central district of the site.

Archaeologists determined that when it was fully functional and maintained his original structure was visible from almost any point in the valley where the site was situated. El Cerrito is the main focus/attraction of the site at Yarumela, along with another visible large mound and a reconstructed small step pyramid close to the river opposite the large mounds.

== Rehabilitation of the archaeological site ==
On April 11, 2019, the mayor of the town of Yarumela and the Honduran Institute of Anthropology and History with the support of the national police of Honduras, restored structure 102 and managed to rehabilitate a good part of the site, installing signs where there is information about the history of the place. It is currently open to both national and foreign public.

In 2024, talks were held for the preservation and restoration of several pyramids with the municipality of the town of Yarumela to turn it into an archaeological park. The project is an initiative of the Institute of Anthropology and History of Honduras.

== See also ==
- Lencan
- Copan
- History of Honduras
