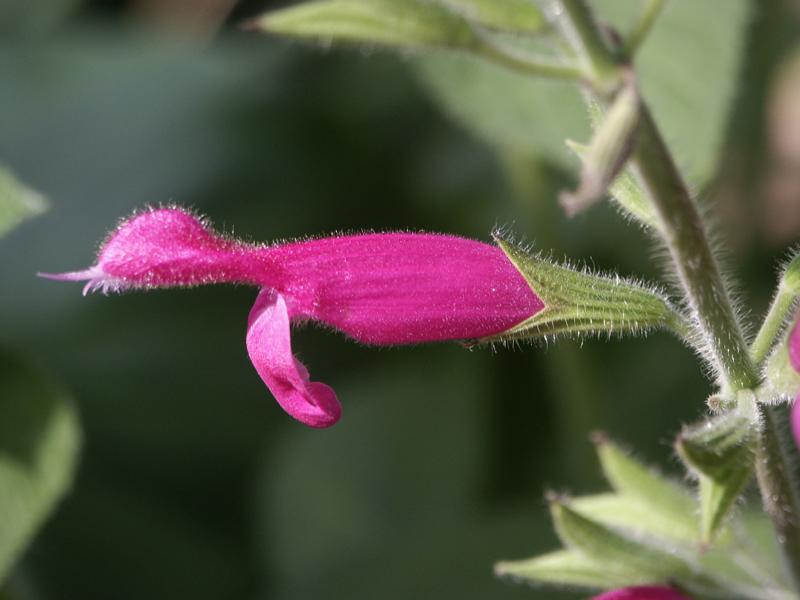

Scientific classification
- Kingdom: Plantae
- Clade: Tracheophytes
- Clade: Angiosperms
- Clade: Eudicots
- Clade: Asterids
- Order: Lamiales
- Family: Lamiaceae
- Genus: Salvia
- Species: S. dorisiana

Binomial name
- Salvia dorisiana Standl.

= Salvia dorisiana =

Species of shrub

Salvia dorisiana, the fruit-scented sage or peach sage, is a perennial shrub native to Honduras. It grows 1–1.3 m tall, and is heavily branched. The leaves have a fruity scent when brushed, and large magenta-pink flowers that bloom in winter. Salvia dorisiana was first described in 1950, and has become popular as a greenhouse plant. The flowers reach up to 5 cm in length, with a lime-green calyx about the same length. The entire plant is covered in hairs whose glands release a pineapple-grapefruit scent.

Salvia dorisiana was named for Doris Zemurray Stone, 1909–1994, archaeologist and ethnographer and director of the national museum of Costa Rica, though many horticulture references apocryphally repeat that it was named after Doris, daughter of Oceanus and Tethys, and the wife of Nereus.
