= Tenampúa =

Archaeological site in Honduras

- Location within Honduras
- 14.233°N 87.552°W
- Associated with: Lencas
- Location: Comayagua Valley

History
- Built: 750 a.C
- Built by: Lencas
- Abandoned: 1050 a.C

Tenampúa is an archaeological site belonging to the Lenca culture dating from the Mesoamerican classic period, located in central Honduras in the Comayagua valley. It is known for having the interesting characteristic of several mounds of between 6 and 15 meters and a fortress inside, in addition to being a place located in a mountainous area with difficult access. The area is also characterized by forests of pine trees and a cool climate hovering between 15 and 21 degrees Celsius in temperature and strong gusts of wind.

== Site description ==
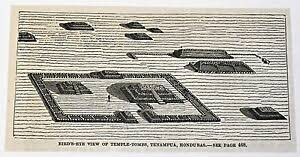
Recreation of 1883 of how the ruins should have looked like back then.

Located in the middle of a pine forest characteristic of central Honduras, 57 km from Tegucigalpa to the south of the municipality of the town of San Antonio, whose plateau is made up of sloping slopes that are difficult to access and 866 meters above the sea. From this space you can see part of the Comayagua valley, La Paz and the mountainous surroundings that adjoin the Francisco Morazán department, for this reason the Lenca decided to build the pre-Columbian fortification there. The 21-hectare area that comprises the archaeological site is made up of several mounds, platforms, and a fortress with walls of between two and four meters and whose base ranges from three to seven meters in which inside it houses stepped pyramidal structures of between 6 m and 12 m.

In the area there are also some bleachers, mounds that were once a characteristic ball court of Mesoamerican cultures, areas with rock engravings and rock art in nearby caves located in the same area. 250 structures have been registered on the site, most of them covered by vegetation. The site was the victim of constant looting for several decades, which meant that a good part of the infrastructure is currently deteriorated or incomplete due to the looting of some residents of the area, so it was registered as cultural heritage until 1997, it is currently protected by guards.

== History ==
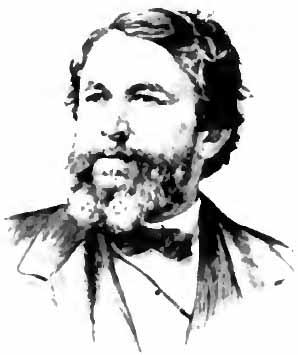
American Explorer G. E. Squier visitored the Ruins in the 19th century.

The little that is known about this site is that it was built by the indigenous Lencas during the Mesoamerican late classical period with the purpose of being a ceremonial center and that it was also used as a refuge. It is not known precisely why it was abandoned or why the Lencas stopped using it as a ceremonial center to perform religious rituals, it may be that it was used more and more as a refuge and military fort during the constant wars they had with different manors as evidenced by the remains of walls found on the site. The best explanation given by Honduran archaeologists for its abandonment would be that several villages that were located near the archaeological site were gradually abandoned by the inhabitants to settle more in lower areas, mainly in the valley, leaving Tenampua in oblivion.

During the 19th century it was visited by the American explorer and archaeologist Ephraim George Squier in 1853, who sent reports and letters about the ruins to the New York community of historians. According to Squier's testimonies, the ruins came to amaze him not only because of their size but also because of the location in which they were built, since it was a feat of engineering to carry out the rocks to the mountainous terrain where they are located.

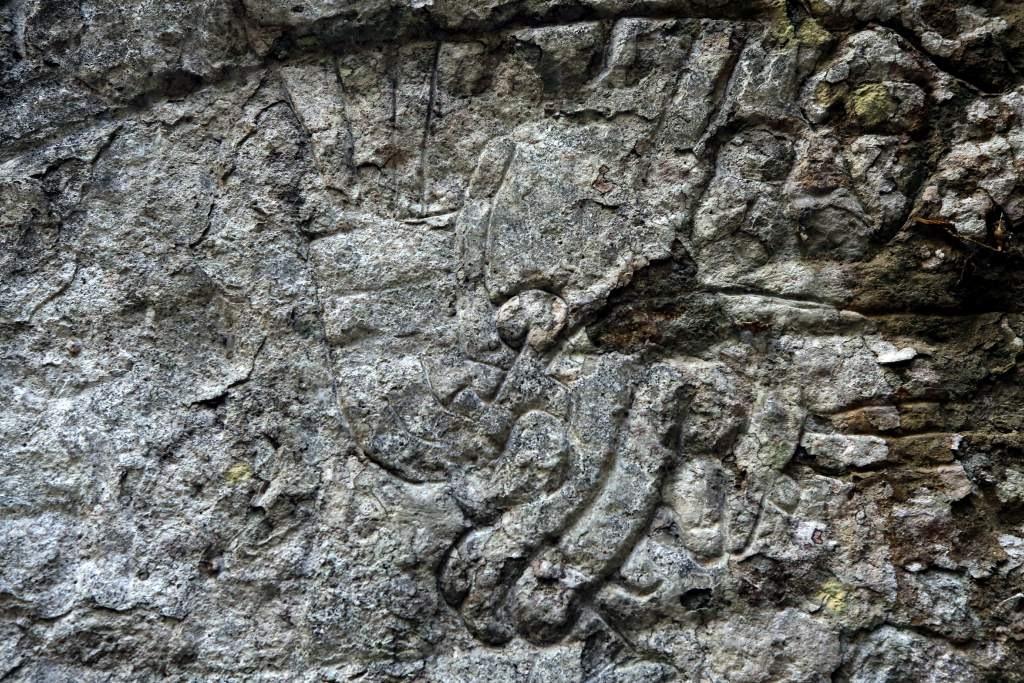
Lenca petroglyph that represents a bird, located in what was once its ball court.

By the time Squier Reported the finding of ball game which was another architectural feature distinctive of Tenampúa. This is probably the only considerably better structure in Tenampúa by the time. Was a court with its ends open. A linear arrangement of stone at the southern end of the field has made many researchers think the opposite. Although it was discovered that these are only the remains of a retaining wall of a large terrace that was created to put the ball game court on flat ground.

Some time later, the area encompassed by the archaeological site was also a victim of the Honduran civil war of 1924, which could considerably damage the structures, which is why in some areas of it bullet caps and parts of bones of soldiers from the national army a few years after the war.

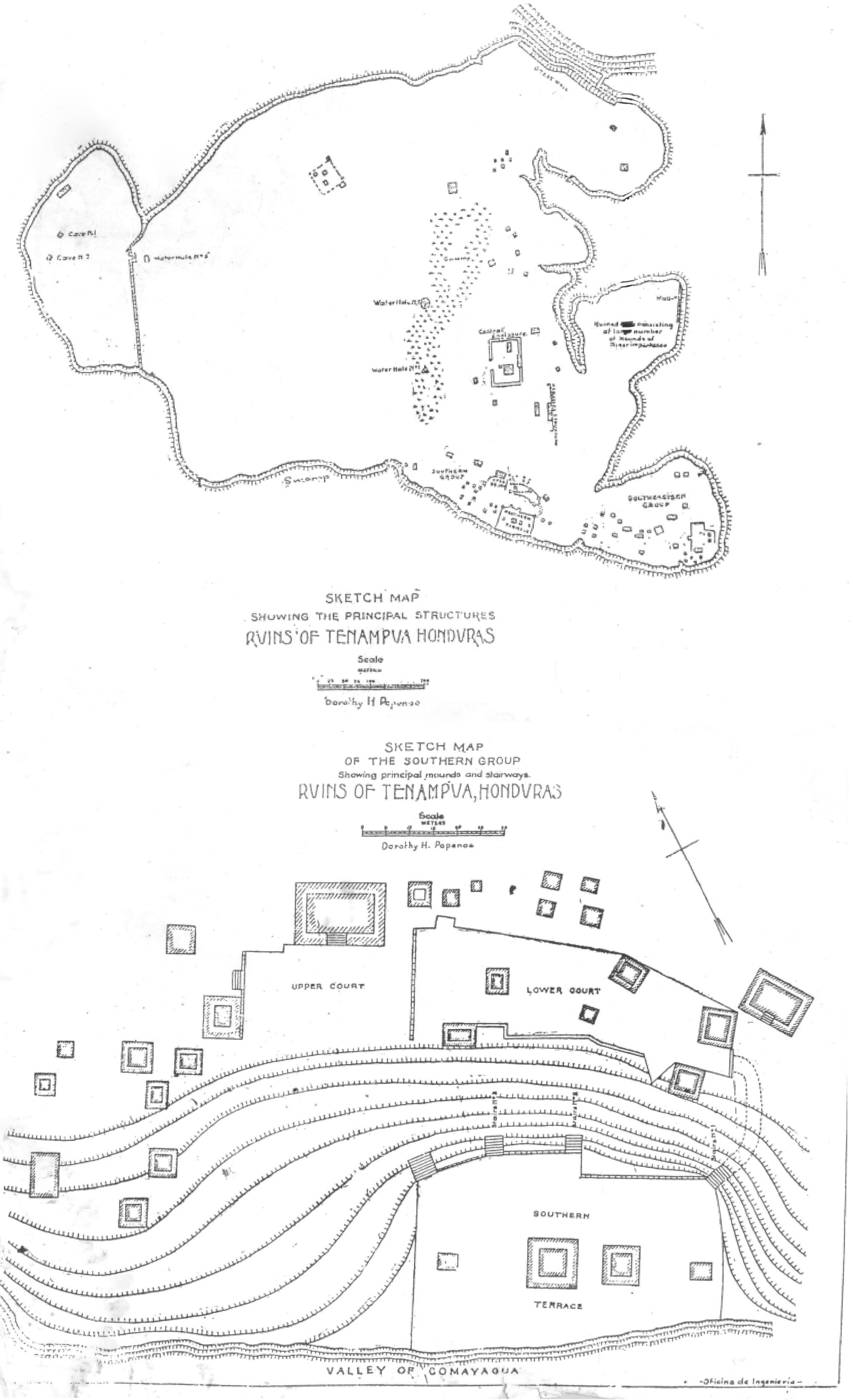
Mapping of the site by the archeologist Dorothy Popenoe in the 1920s.

One of the archaeologists who managed to map the site completely was Dorothy Popenoe, who left some maps of the exact location of various structures and evidence that the site was a safe area for several residents of nearby villages where they could take shelter during times of conflict. The reports indicated that the various plazas were connected by steps which can be barely seen among the vegetation of the place.

According to the archaeologist Federico Lunardi at the time of visiting the ruins, they still had several lagoons and palaces that were still visible in 1948, which would suggest that the site also had recreation areas for the ruling elite and the priestly caste. Currently you can still see an area with stoneware and some wells that, due to abandonment, currently measure half a meter deep, which suggests that the Lencas managed a system of aqueducts that took advantage of rainwater and the streams near the site to launder, store it, and distribute it within the enclosure.

In 1957 the site was studied by archaeologist Doris Stone, who reported the use of “lime cement” (the studies implies that it is stucco), as a floor in the main mound of Tenampúa. This mound was also enclosed by a relatively long and quite elaborate rectangular wall, which had an only entrance on the west side. In Comayagua stucco is not frequently found. In fact, the only other place where this type of use of stucco has been found is in Yarumela but in a Preclassical context.

Currently the site can be accessed by the public, although with difficulty as it is located in a mountainous and wooded area considerably away from inhabited areas although there are guides.

== Findings ==
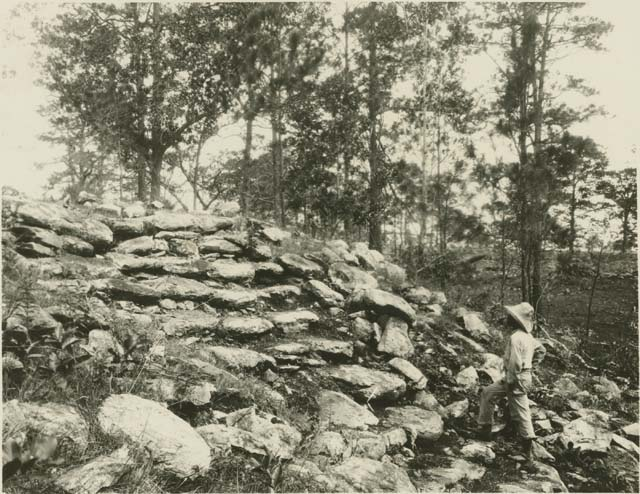
Staircase No.1 after its reconstruction in 1927.

Several researchers have found various types of ceramics with exquisite engravings and decorations, obsidian arrowheads, and jade carvings, have been found in the area, also statuettes representing some deities of the Lenca Mythology such as Itanipuca, Ilanguipuca, and Icelaca. Currently exhibited in museums in Comayagua and Tegucigalpa.

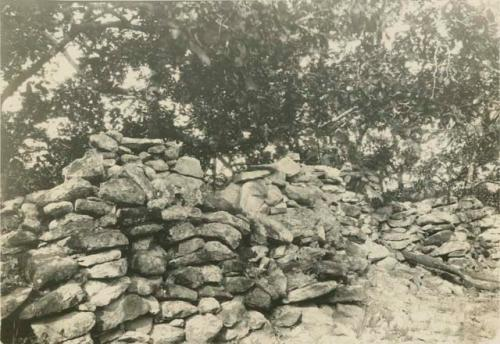
The great wall.

Mrs. Popenoe was able to see several mounds that she mapped and a series of steps that provided access to the different terraces. At the time of arriving at the site, the remains were partially preserved, so during his stay at the site, with the help of his team, he decided to carry out a reconstruction of the staircase no. 1 of the site, which can still be seen today without However, it can be difficult to find because of the weeds that frequently grow in the area. He was also able to reconstruct what he calls the "Wall of the upper terrace in the Great Avenue", which is one of the residential terraces of the Lenca elite during the classic period.

Another findings are supposed temples near the area according to some North American researchers, although due to deterioration they are currently already collapsed or reduced to rubble covered by vegetation. Remains of the main defensive wall of more than 200 meters in radius have been found, which is destroyed by destructive activities in some areas.

=== Gallery ===
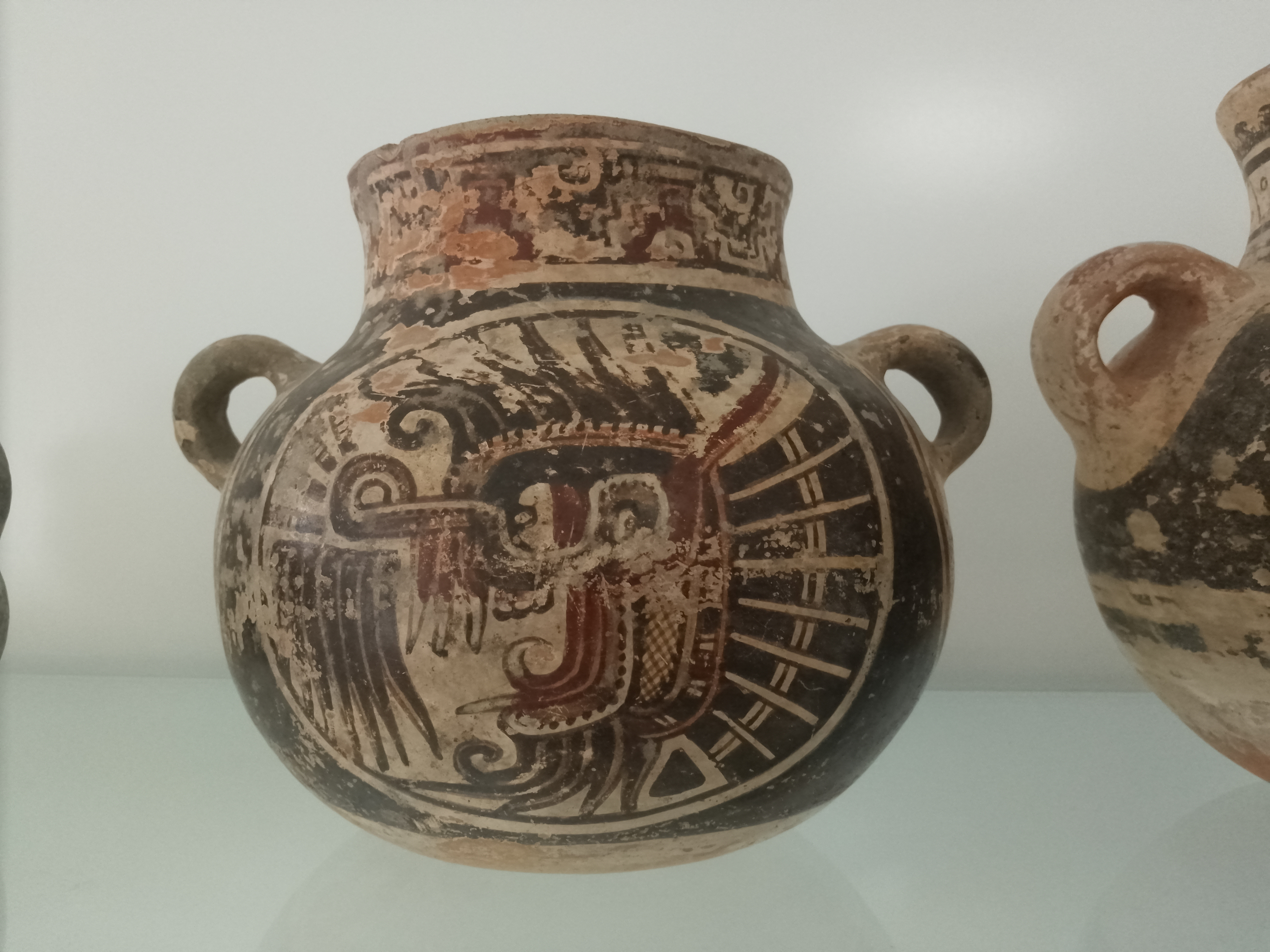

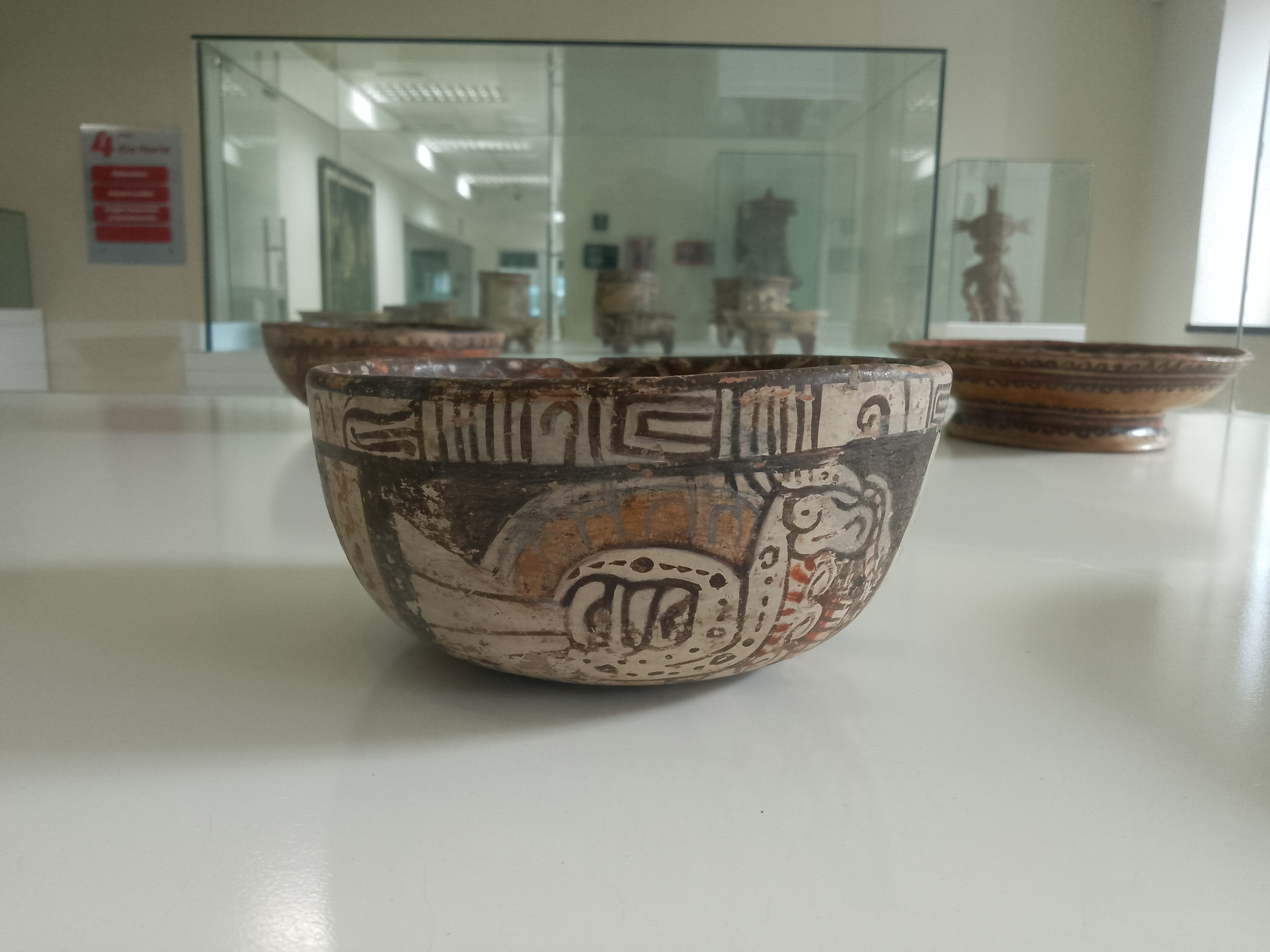

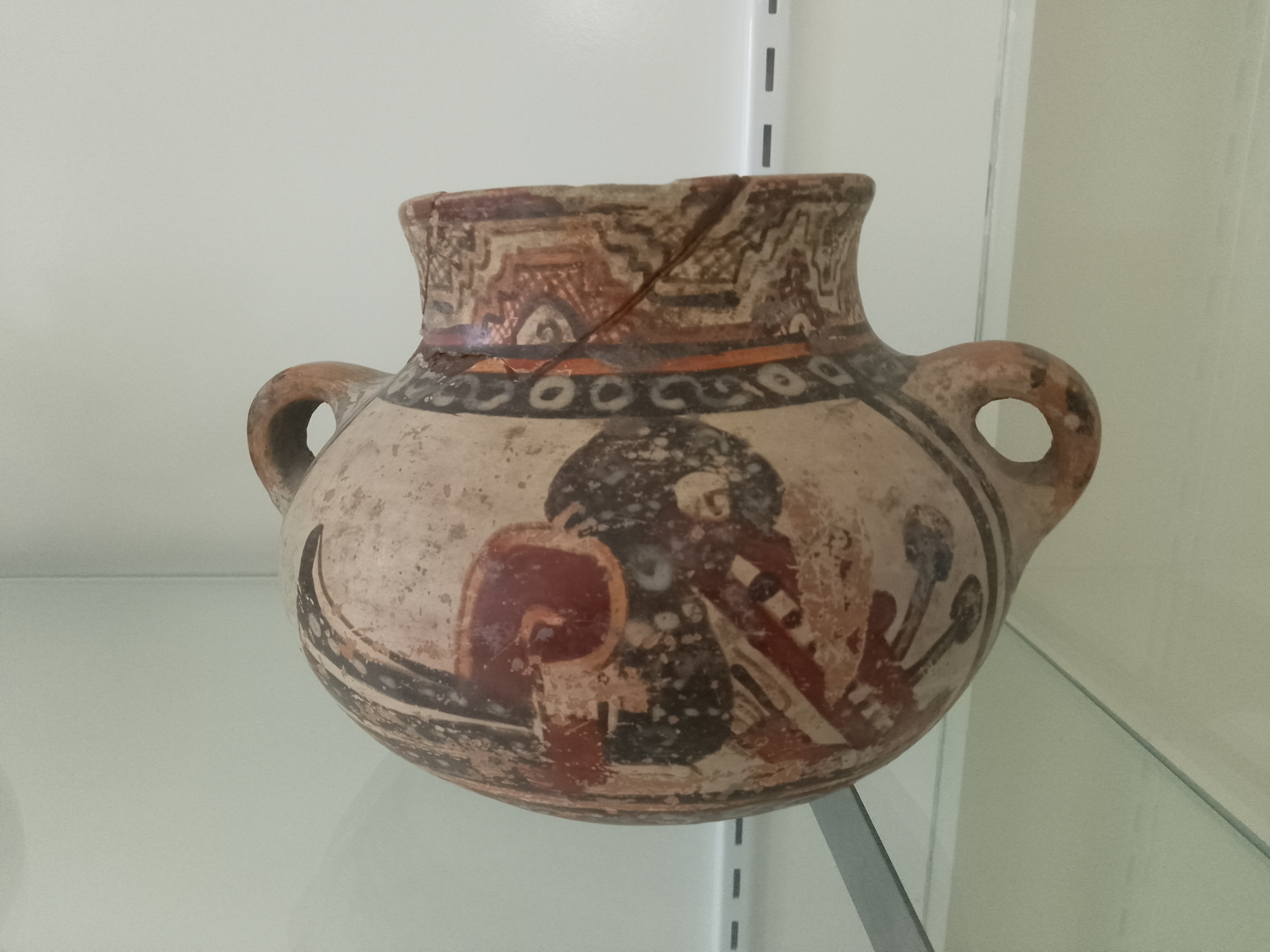

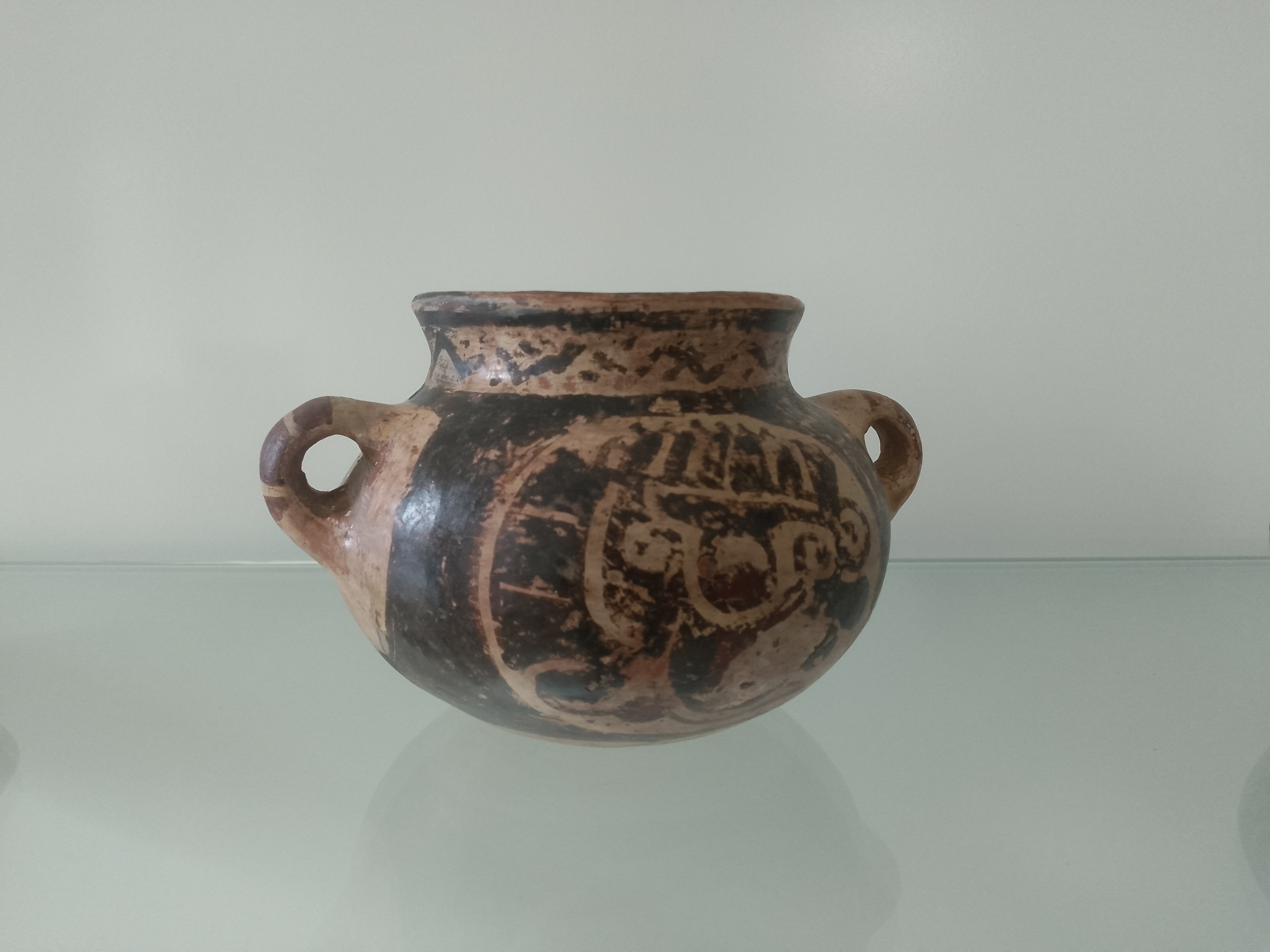

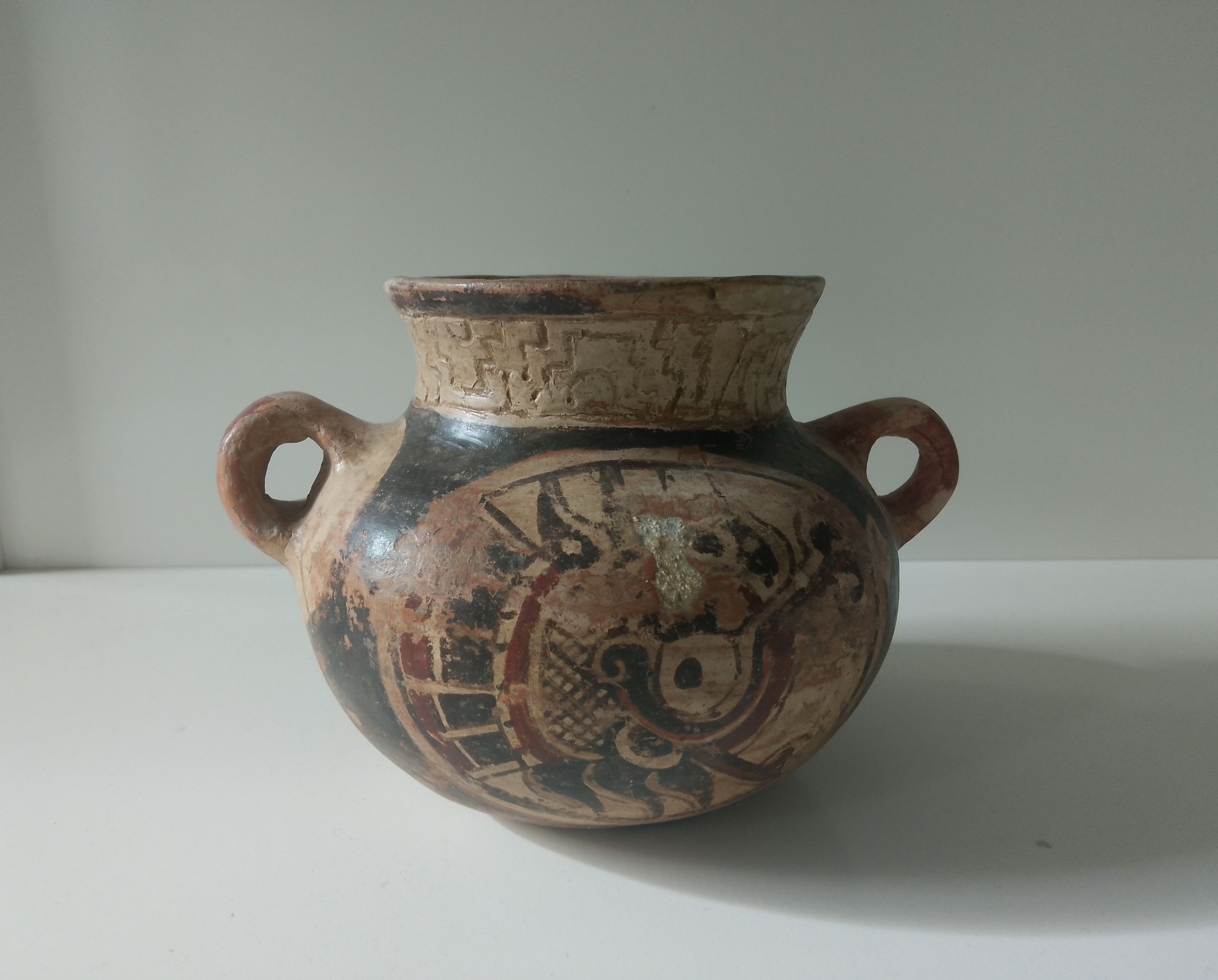

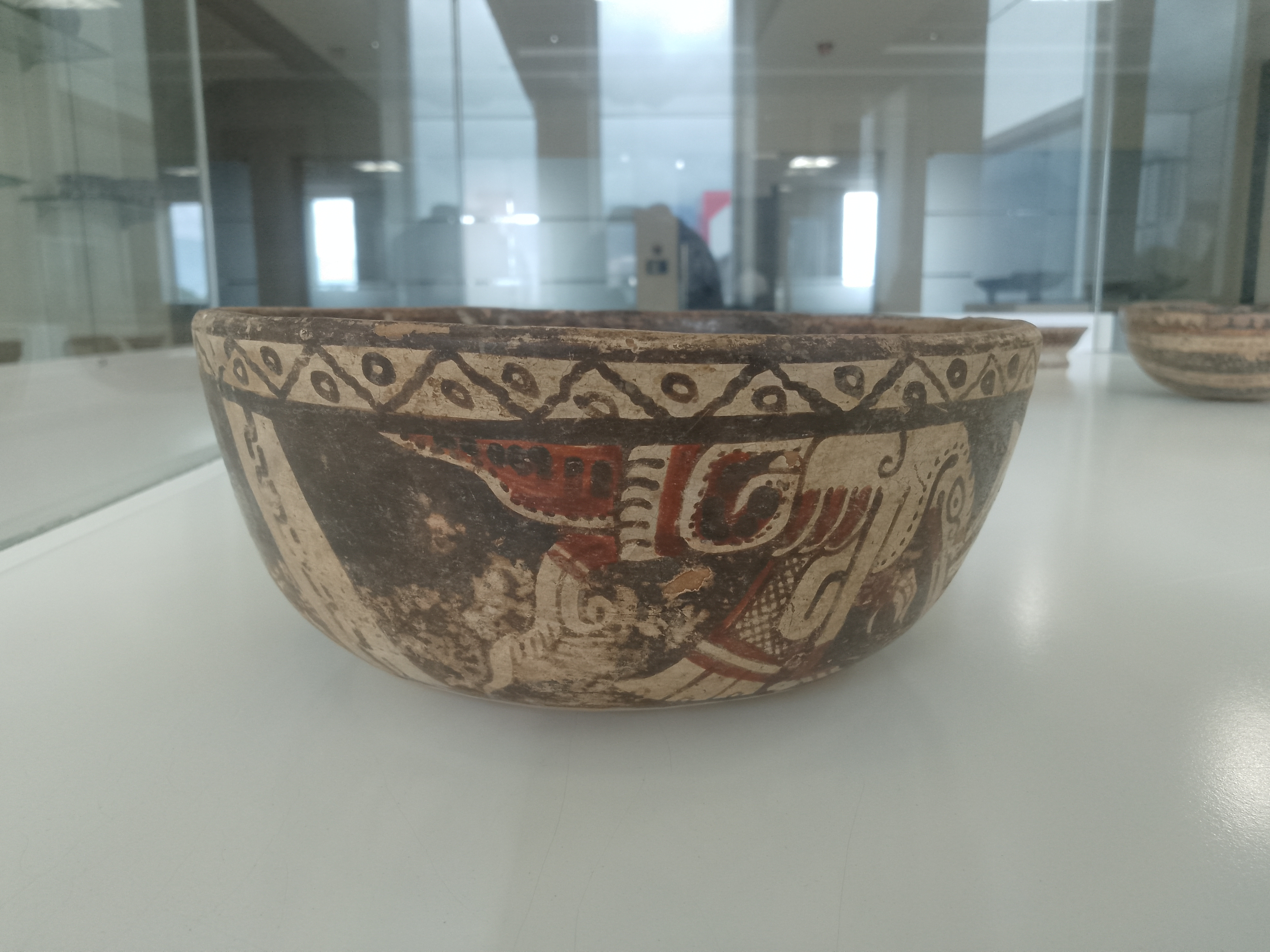

== See also ==
- Yarumela
- Copán
- Los Naranjos
