= Zemurray =

Zemurray is a surname. Notable people with the surname include:

- Doris Zemurray Stone (1909–1994), American archaeologist and ethnographer
- Sam Zemurray (1877–1961), American businessman, father of Doris
