= Cerro Palenque =

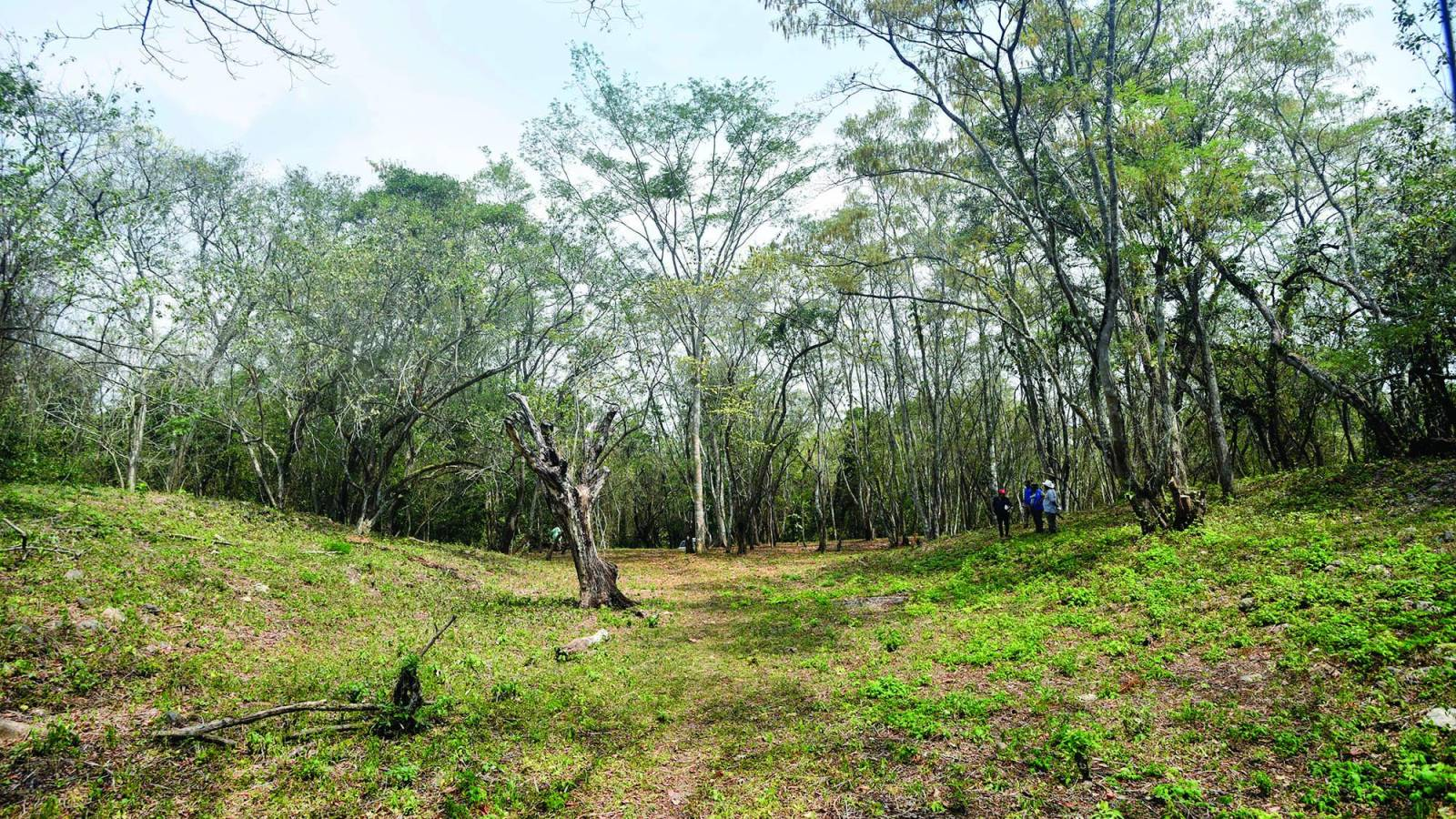
The ball court of the city.

Cerro Palenque is an archaeological site in the department of Cortés in Honduras. The city was founded in the Late Classic (500-800 AD) but reached its peak population and grew to over 500 structures in the Terminal Classic (850-1100 AD). Archaeologists cannot determine how the people who lived at Cerro Palenque would have identified themselves since unlike the Maya of Copan and far western Honduras, they left no writing. Over the years archaeologists have tried to ascertain the identity of the people who lived on the lower Ulua river drainage at various times in terms of populations known to have existed at the time of the Spanish conquest (1536). Popular candidates include the Tol (formerly Jicaque), Lenca, and Maya. Unfortunately, archaeologists cannot currently determine if it was one of these groups, or some other unnamed group.

== Location and context ==
The site today is found on top of the hill known as Cerro Palenque (232 meters above sea level), above the town of Santiago, near the confluence of the Ulua, Humuya (Comayagua) and Blanco rivers, and on several hilltops to the north. It is located some 40 kilometers from the city of San Pedro Sula in Honduras.

The first part of the site to be settled was on the top of the hill, Cerro Palenque, and along its sides. This part was developed in the Late Classic (500 to 800 AD) and remained fairly small, but impressive. In the Terminal Classic (850-1100 AD) the city moved to the lower hill tops north of Cerro Palenque. In the Terminal Classic, this was the largest city in the lower Ulua river valley.

Because of its location where the major rivers enter the valley from the south and southwest, Cerro Palenque was in a strategic position where it could have mediated access from the interior of the country to goods produced along the coast, and coming in trade with Belize and Yucatan.

The Maya of Yucatan told the Spanish, in the 16th century, that the Ulua River valley was the land of feathers and honey. They also valued it for its chocolate (cacao). Pottery, and other kinds of artifacts, tell us that there was trade between various cities in the Ulua river valley, and the Maya of Belize and Yucatan because artifacts from these Maya centers have been found in cities in the valley at this time, and in turn, artifacts made in the valley have turned up in Maya cities in Belize and Yucatan.

The valley is formed by the Ulúa, Comayagua, and Chamelecón rivers, which provided natural transport routes into the rest of present Honduras as well as Central America. The Gulf of Honduras facilitated easy access to Yucatán and Belize. The valley was agriculturally fertile, and had access through nearby supplies or long distance exchange to luxury goods like spondylus and other marine shells, copper (in the postclassic), feathers (especially quetzal), obsidian, jade, and turquoise.

== Excavations and findings ==
The fact that there were ruins on the top of Cerro Palenque has been known for a long time. Its first mention may be in A Ladies Ride across Spanish Honduras published in 1884.

Dorothy Popenoe excavated at the Late Classic portion of Cerro Palenque in the 1920s but died before she published the results of her excavations. Doris Stone included her analysis of the materials Popenoe excavated in her Archaeology of the North Coast of Honduras (1941)

In 1979, John S. Henderson began a project authorized by the Honduran Institute of Anthropology and History (Instituto Hondureño de Antropología e Historia - IHAH) to survey and test more than 2400 square kilometers of the valley, to record all of the archaeological sites within it, and perform a series of excavations to understand the chronology of settlement (who lived where, when). In this context, Rosemary A. Joyce did survey work and rediscovered the site. As part of her dissertation fieldwork, she mapped, and excavated at Cerro Palenque in 1982 and 1983. Her dissertation, and the book listed below are some of the results from that work. Most recently, Julia Hendon has been conducting excavations in the elite residential groups off the ballcourt.

The earliest settlement of this city, in the site called CR-44, atop Cerro Palenque itself, is Late Classic (500-850 AD). As a new city center was built to the north, this part of the site was abandoned. The new center was on top of a lower set of hills north of Cerro Palenque in the Terminal Classic (850-1100 AD). This new center includes a 300 meter long plaza and a large ball-court. There are also the remains of two causeways leading to residential groups off the main plaza. In the Terminal Classic, Cerro Palenque grew to be the largest city in the valley, with over 500 buildings.

Settlement patterns shifted in the post-Classic (1150-1536) and Cerro Palenque was abandoned in favor of settlements right down along the river banks. The valley itself remains an important resource area for the Maya of Yucatan and Belize for chocolate, feathers, and honey.

== Conservation and development ==
The Honduran Institute of Anthropology and History (IHAH) obtained 1.09 km² of land in 1997 to create an archaeological park. The intent of the park is to develop tourism infrastructure as well as benefit rural Honduran communities around the settlement. In 2005 the IHAH contracted with an outside firm to develop a management plan for Cerro Palenque. The consultants wrote an unrealistic plan that called for a 10 year development program with a cost of more than $6,000,000. A link to that plan, in Spanish, is included in the references below (see "Plan de Manejo").

In 2007 the IHAH proposed a project that would develop a visitor center and interpretive panels for Cerro Palenque, and is in the process of seeking funds to develop this park. The 2009 coup in Honduras stopped these efforts.

== See also ==
- Mesoamerican chronology
