= Zamorano =

Boarding school in Francisco Morazán, Honduras

Zamorano University (Pan-American Agricultural School)
- Type: Educational Institution nonprofit
- Established: 1942
- Rector: Sergio Rodriguez Royo
- Dean: Ana Margarita Maier Acosta
- Students: 1,253 (2016)
- Location: San Antonio de Oriente, Francisco Morazán, Honduras, Honduras; 14.009895°N 87.011206°W
- Campus: 4,092.74 hectares
- Colours: Green Red Blue Yellow
- Website: www.zamorano.edu
- Location within Honduras

The Zamorano Pan-American Agricultural School (Spanish: Escuela Agrícola Panamericana Zamorano), generally known as El Zamorano or Zamorano, is a private, coeducational, boarding school located in the valley of the Yeguare river, Honduras. El Zamorano's main focus is agricultural and there are four different programs to choose from in the school. Enrollment stands at more than 1000 students. It is currently registered in Delaware as a 501(c)3 non-profit organisation.

Zamorano is host to students from several countries, including Honduras, Guatemala, El Salvador, Nicaragua, Costa Rica, Panama, Ecuador, Peru, Colombia, Chile, Bolivia, Haiti, Dominican Republic, Paraguay, and Mexico.

== History ==
The school was founded in 1941 by Samuel Zemurray (1877–1961) a Russian born American and president of the United Fruit Company. Mr. Zemurray set out to create a high quality agricultural education centre, devoted to the training of youth from throughout the region. To carry out this dream, he recruited Dr. Wilson Popenoe, a renowned botanist and horticulturist of the time who had extensive experience in the region, and had already organised the Lancetilla Botanical Gardens in Honduras.

Popenoe travelled for several weeks in 1941, exploring the Central American highlands to develop the project. He finally chose an estate of approximately 15 km² in the valley of the Yeguare, some 30 kilometres from the Honduran capital. The name Zamorano is that of the family from the province of Zamora, Spain that originally owned the estate.

Construction of the school began in late 1941. Dr. Popenoe became the Founding Director of the new institution and held that post until 1957.

== Campus ==
The university is located on a large campus. The entire property lies on approximately 70 km², including natural forests and two micro basins, large productive areas, many places for recreation and various buildings. There are green areas, paths and lagoons harbouring numerous wild species that have found natural shelter on the Zamorano campus.

Zamorano hosts flora and fauna both endemic to the region and from across the tropics. The university is home to one of the largest herbaria in Latin America, The Paul Standley Herbarium, which houses over 300,000 classified specimens from Meso-America.

The campus is home to more than 1000 resident students on the campus eleven months of every year. An area of 200,000 m² is set aside for student dorms. An area of 70,000 m² is used for various aspects.

== Library ==
Zamorano has one main library, the Wilson Popenoe Library. This library has a diverse collection of books. It has over 18,000 specialised books, 6,500 technical brochures, access to online databases worldwide, digital documents and a considerable number of magazines.

== Publications ==
- La Zeta, the university's student-run newspaper was published until few years ago with a weekly edition. Some efforts have been made to bring it back but they have not been successful as to February 2020.
- The Annual Report is the report, published yearly and focused on the activities for that year. It shows a brief the description of the activities that Zamorano has realised in all the year. Annual Report
- The Class Profiles is the university's yearbook, published yearly and focused on the senior class for that year. It shows a brief profile of the graduating seniors, their interest, their projects and related experience.
- Ceiba. A peer review publication that started in 1950. Ceiba is open access and publishes articles using the continuous publication model. Available at http://www.lamjol.info/index.php/CEIBA (past issues and submissions) and https://web.archive.org/web/20130902064235/http://revistas.zamorano.edu/index.php/CEIBA (past issues).

== Enterprises ==
The enterprises are the university's production, processing and marketing units, where the students learn by doing. Working in the enterprises is an integral part for the formation of each student and takes up about half of their time. The enterprises provide the physical resources and the right environment where the student develops skills and knowledge that prepare them for their future careers. The University Enterprises are living labs where the students face what has been learned in the classroom and confront it with the real world and in doing so improve their learning process.

The University Enterprises are distributed into three main groups: agriculture, animal husbandry and processing plants. There is also a marketing and sales unit in which students are actively involved, interacting with customers and the market. The agriculture group is made up of the agricultural units for horticulture, orchards, forestry and grains and seed.

The animal husbandry group includes livestock units in dairy and beef cattle, swine production and a support unit in agricultural machinery and irrigation. The processing plants group consists of plants for processing dairy and meat products, animal feeds, seed production, fruit and horticultural products, post-harvest care of horticultural products and a sawmill. Each business unit is managed by means of an agribusiness plan and agro-budget so that operations are handled as a company with financial and educational goals.

== Presidents ==
- Wilson Popenoe
- Joseph Stewart Courand
- John Gordon Smith
- Simón Malo
- Keith L. Andrews (1992 – December 2002)
- Kenneth Hoadley (January 2003 – December 2010)
- Roberto Cuevas García (January 2010 – May 2014)
- Jeffrey Landsdale (June 2014 – November 2020)
- Tanya Müller García (April 2021 – December 2022)
- Sergio Rodriguez Royo (April 2023 – present)

== Distinguished alumni ==
A number of Zamorano alumni have achieved important roles in the government, non-profit organisations, universities, and multi-national companies. Some of these alumni include: Jose Antonio Molina (Botanist, Honduras '46), Marcel Laniado (Banker, Ecuador '49), Carlos Eduardo Mesa Mesa (Business Magnate, Colombia), Eduardo Galo (Novus International Director of North America, Honduras '95), Jose Rene Portillo, Cojutepeque, El Salvador. Andres Bernardo Gandarillas Mass (Co-Founder Beyond the Equator, Bolivia '12).

== See also ==
- Samuel Zemurray
- Connie Jiménez, Governor of Los Rios
- Paul Popenoe
