= Playa de los Muertos =

Archaeological site in Honduras

Playa de los Muertos (Beach of the Dead) is an archaeological site from the Middle Formative period and is located on the Honduras north coast, in the Ulua valley, however it has "had a continuous history going back as early as any sedentary society yet documented in Mesoamerica". Thought to at one time have been a village, Playa de los Muertos is primarily known through its burials and ceramics. Archaeologists have identified a strong Aztec and Mayan influence on the early inhabitants at Playa de los Muertos, however it is considered a distinct culture. The site is most notable for its finely made ceramic figurines, famously excavated by Dorothy Popenoe. These figurines, in particular those depicting the female form, have helped archaeologists interpret gender roles at the site. Archaeologists believe that people at Playa de los Muertos likely participated in long-distance trade networks which reach from Guatemala to the Gulf Coast Olmec centers.

== Etymology ==
The name "Playa de los Muertos" literally translated means "beach of the dead" in Spanish.

== Location ==
Playa de los Muertos is located on the Ulua River in the Cortés Department of northwestern Honduras. It is also located 10 km from the archaeological site of Puerto Escondido which is located on a small tributary of the Chamelecón River, one of two tropical rivers that form the lower Ulua Valley on the Caribbean coast of Honduras.

== Excavation history ==
George Byron Gordon first excavated the archaeological site of Playa de los Muertos from 1895 to 1897. Gordon conducted these excavations while touring Central America doing various excavations at sites across the continent. The information collected from Gordon's excavations gave important insight to the stratigraphic relationships between the various culture groups in the area. Particularly the analysis of pottery sherds helped in finding these relationships.

Then in 1928, Dorothy Popenoe commenced excavations at the site. Popenoe's excavations centered on the cemeteries located at Playa de los Muertos. Many of the pots and figurines recovered centre around gender roles and how the female form was depicted. During excavations, Popenoe drew sketches of artifacts and of the site as she excavated. The excavations were focused on the cemeteries and in particular the grave goods that were stored with the bodies. These excavations unearthed many pots, clay figurines and animal bones. The high number of animal bones has led researchers to believe that Playa de los Muertos was at least partially supported through hunting. Of the many potsherds and figurines that have been excavated, a large number depict females and distinct female sexual characteristics. Many of the figurines are depicted with; little clothing, sit cross-legged with one knee drawn up, and distinct sexual characteristics are visible.

A more contemporary example of work done at Playa de los Muertos can be seen in the work of Rosemary A. Joyce. Joyce has carried out various work on the Playa de los Muertos site in the late 20th century. Her analysis of the site reveals that many of the pots date as far back as 1600 BC and that established trade networks with areas in present-day Mexico date as far back as 1100 BC. Joyce's recent analysis of the site includes gendering and identity at Playa de los Muertos. Joyce identifies the importance of the individual at the site and discusses agency at Playa de los Muertos. The role of females and how they are depicted is also central to Joyce's work.

=== George Vaillant ===
George Clapp Vaillant was born 1901 in Boston, Massachusetts and attended Harvard University, where in 1927 he received his doctorate in Anthropology with a thesis that established the chronology of Mayan ceramics. After finishing his doctorate, he joined the American Museum of Natural History in 1927 and then began working in the Valley of Mexico. In terms of the excavations at Playas de los Muertos, Vaillant used the pottery found at the site in order to trace the development of the Middle Cultures of Mesoamerica. He did this by using the Law of Superposition, comparing the ceramics found at other sites and to those found at Plays de Los Muertos and cross dating.

=== Dorothy Popenoe ===
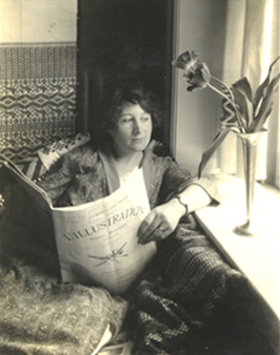
Dorothy Popenoe reading her morning paper.

Born Dorothy Kate Hughes, Popenoe was born June 1899, in Ashford, Surrey, England. She attended the Welsh Girls' School in Ashford until the beginning of World War I when she joined the English Land Army. After the war, she worked at the Kew Garden in London, England as an assistant to Dr. Otto Knapf until 1923 when she was invited by Agnes Chase to join the staff of the United States National Herbarium in the Office of Foreign Plant Introduction. She conducted numerous studies of cultivated bamboo. Once there, she met and married Wilson Popenoe, the agricultural explorer and later gave birth to their five children. In 1925, her husband accepted a position with the United Fruit Company as the director of agricultural experiments and moved the family to Tela on the Atlantic Coast of Honduras. While in Honduras, Popenoe developed an interest in archaeology and worked on several Honduran archaeological sites including in the Mayan fortress of Tenampua in 1927. Between 1928 and 1932 she excavated in the pre-Columbian cemetery at Playa de los Muertos. However she could not complete her work because in December 1932, she ate an unripe, uncooked akee fruit, which is believed to have poisoned her and as a result she died. The results of her excavations at Playas de los Muertos were published posthumously in 1934.

== Gender Roles at Playa de los Muertos ==
Much of what is now known about the gender roles at Playa de los Muertos is based on the analysis of unusually detailed clay figurines. These figurines have few different but reoccurring hair styles; they also tend to wear ornamentations. Rosemary A. Joyce, Associate Professor of Anthropology at Harvard University argues in her analysis that on the basis of these figurines being a representation of individuals. The ceramics represent particularly well women. Joyce believes that on the basis of ceramic images we may be able to draw conclusions about gender roles in the Honduran societies in the Formative period. Joyce’s analysis draws on the descriptions of hairstyles of women in Mexico in the 16th century. The Playa de los Muertos figurines hairstyles – as well as portrayed jewelry, strongly resemble these descriptions.

Therefore, the similarity would suggest that both Aztec and Playa de los Muertos societies were very conservative in the expression of the genders and life stages. Consequently, the ornamentation and hair style worn by an individual would be dictated by their gender and age. The figurines would be seen as "bodily representation".

In her analysis of ceramics, Joyce had compared the Playa de los Muertos – Ulua Polychrome art with the Lower and Central American and Classic Lowland ceramics. In all of these cases, figurines of men and women are usually represented doing some sort of labour or with objects related to labour. Joyce's analysis suggests that ceramics represent dichotomy embedded in gendered labour. Playa de los Muertos figurines mainly represent females with pots, or with a child or touching their hair. Joyce interprets these images as a way of showing the importance of women's contributions to society: preparing food and bearing children. In her analysis of gender at Playa de los Muertos, Joyce suggests that the gender dynamic had been strongly influenced by the alliance with Classic Maya culture.
