= Museum of Comayagua =

Archaeological museum

The Museum of Comayagua
- Museo de Comayagua
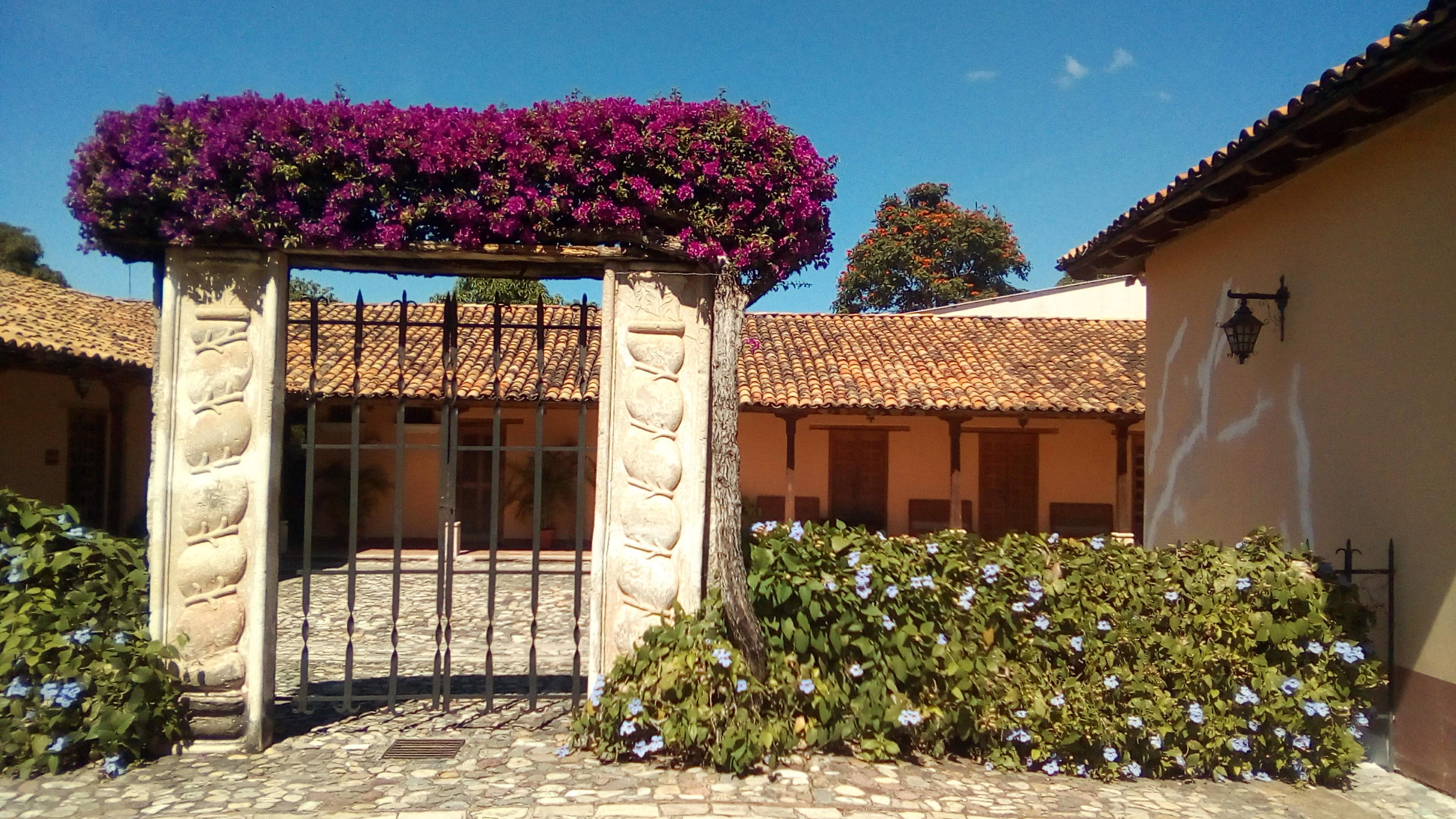
- Museum garden.
- Established: June 6, 1940
- Location: Comayagua, Honduras
- Type: Archaeological Museum
- Collection size: Archaeological objects from antiquity to the present, including pre-Hispanic objects of Lenca origin and more
- Founders: Honduran Institute of Anthropology and History
- Website: Museo de Comayagua

The Museum of Comayagua (also known until 2008 as the Regional Museum of Archeology of Comayagua) is an archaeological museum located in the city of Comayagua, Honduras, founded on June 6, 1940 and managed by the Honduran Institute of Anthropology and History. The museum has ten exhibition rooms and an archaeological theme of the history of the Comayagua Valley from ancient times to the present day. It is the only museum in the world dedicated to the Lenca culture. The museum is housed in a historic Spanish colonial house built in the late 16th century with a long history of use as the Presidential House of Honduras among many other important historical uses.

== History of the building ==
=== 16th to 18th century ===
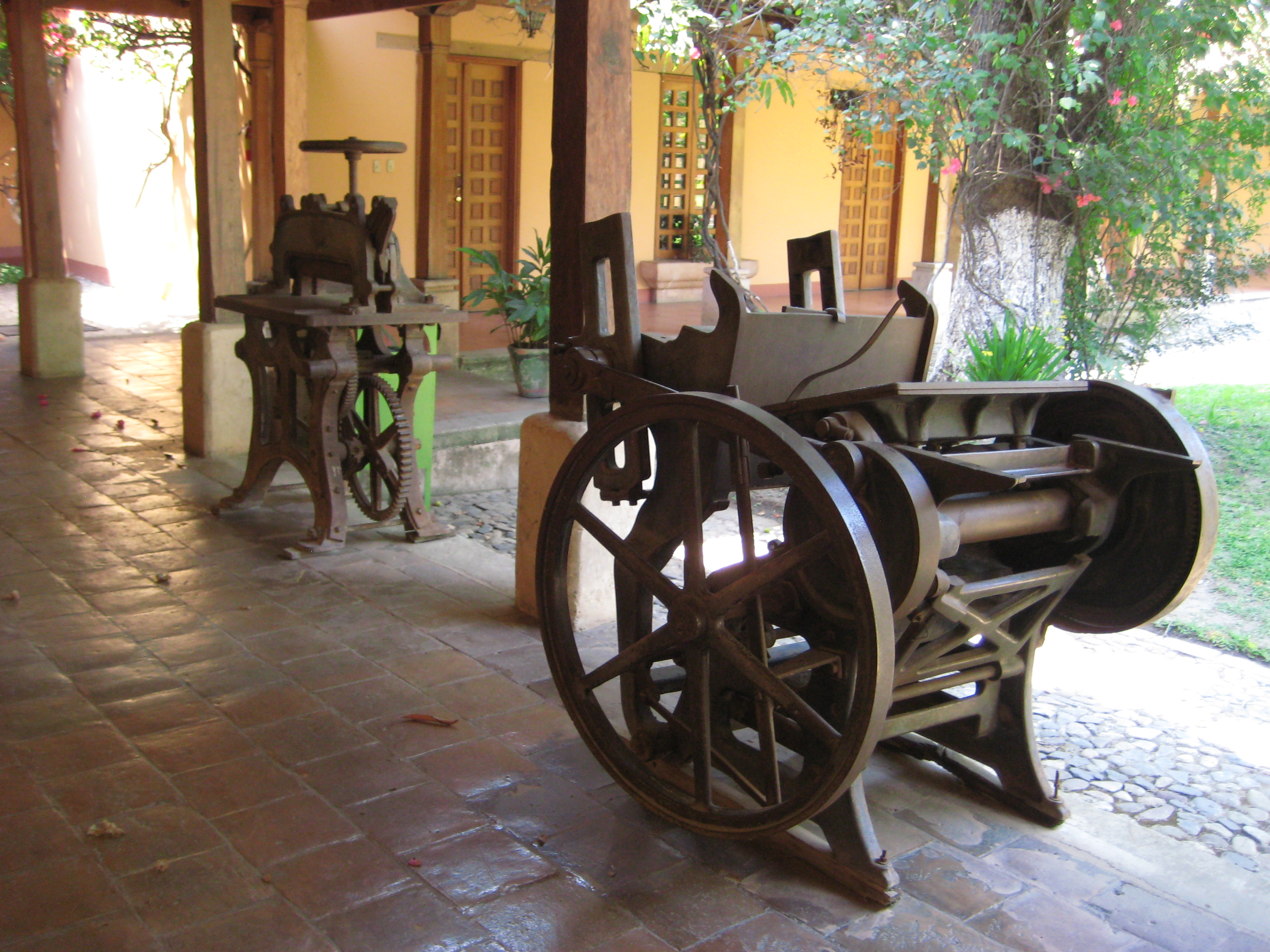
Typewriters in the museum dating from colonial era.

The property was built at the end of the 16th century as the private home of Francisco del Barco y Santiponce, the Spanish conqueror of San Jorge de Olancho. The house has a typical Spanish colonial design of a high class family of the time. After the death of Francisco del Barco y Santiponce, the house became the property of his granddaughter Juana del Barco. In the 18th century, the house became the property of Joaquín Fernández Lindo y Molina, councilor of the Comayagua City Council. His son, Juan Lindo, was a royal second lieutenant of the city and political chief and mayor of the province of Comayagua, then a deputy in the National Constituent Assembly and finally president of Honduras.

=== 19th century ===
In 1804, the house was inhabited by the then dean of the Guatemalan Bar Association, Norberto Serrano Polo, legal advisor to the Comayagua Municipality. In 1862, in the Republican era, the property became the Presidential House of Honduras after being confiscated by President José María Molina in 1860. When the Honduran capital was transferred for the first time to Tegucigalpa, the house stopped working as the house presidential for a period until it became so when the government of Don Ponciano Leiva Madrid transferred the capital to Comayagua again.In 1880, when the capital was finally transferred permanently to Tegucigalpa, the house was no longer a presidential house for good.

=== Twentieth century ===
From the end of the 19th century and until 1940 the house had various administrative functions of the city. In 1940 a part of the building is designated as a private museum. In the 1970s, the house became the property of the Honduran Institute of Anthropology and History under the name of "Museo Regional de Arqueología de Comayagua". In 1995 it became the headquarters of the "Comayagua Colonial" program, being the pilot project, housing the offices of the Master Plan and the Workshop School.

== Museum history ==
The museum was founded on June 6, 1940 as a private museum specializing in the archeology of the Comayagua Valley. In the 1970s it became the property of the Honduran Institute of Anthropology and History under the name of "Regional Museum of Archeology of Comayagua". In 1999 the building was restored and reopened to the public in December 1999. In 2008 the museum changed its name to Museo de Comayagua.

== Collection ==
The museum has a collection of archaeological objects from antiquity to the present with pre-Hispanic objects of Lenca origin from different periods and sites of pre-Columbian occupation in the Comayagua Valley. The museum has a collection with objects from El Chilcal, Tenampúa, Las Vegas and Salitrón. The museum also has objects from the Yarumela settlements in pre-Hispanic times, the founding of the city of Coamyagua as a Spanish city, the development of the city during the colonial and republican times, up to the present day. The collection includes polychrome ceramics from the Preclassic period of America, with jars, glasses and pieces of jade. The museum also has a public library and an auditorium for cultural events.

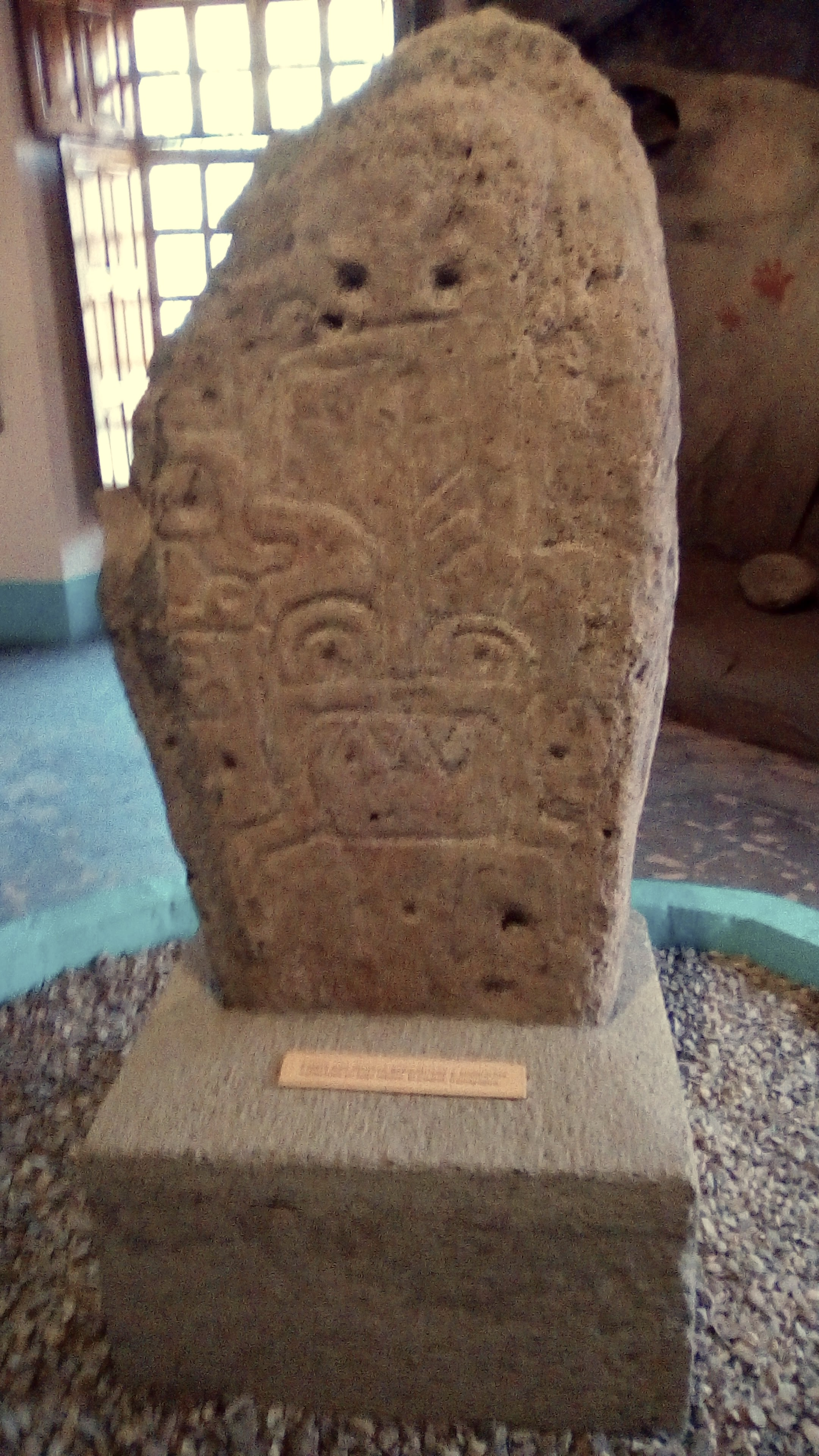
Stela from the Mesoamerican pre-classic period

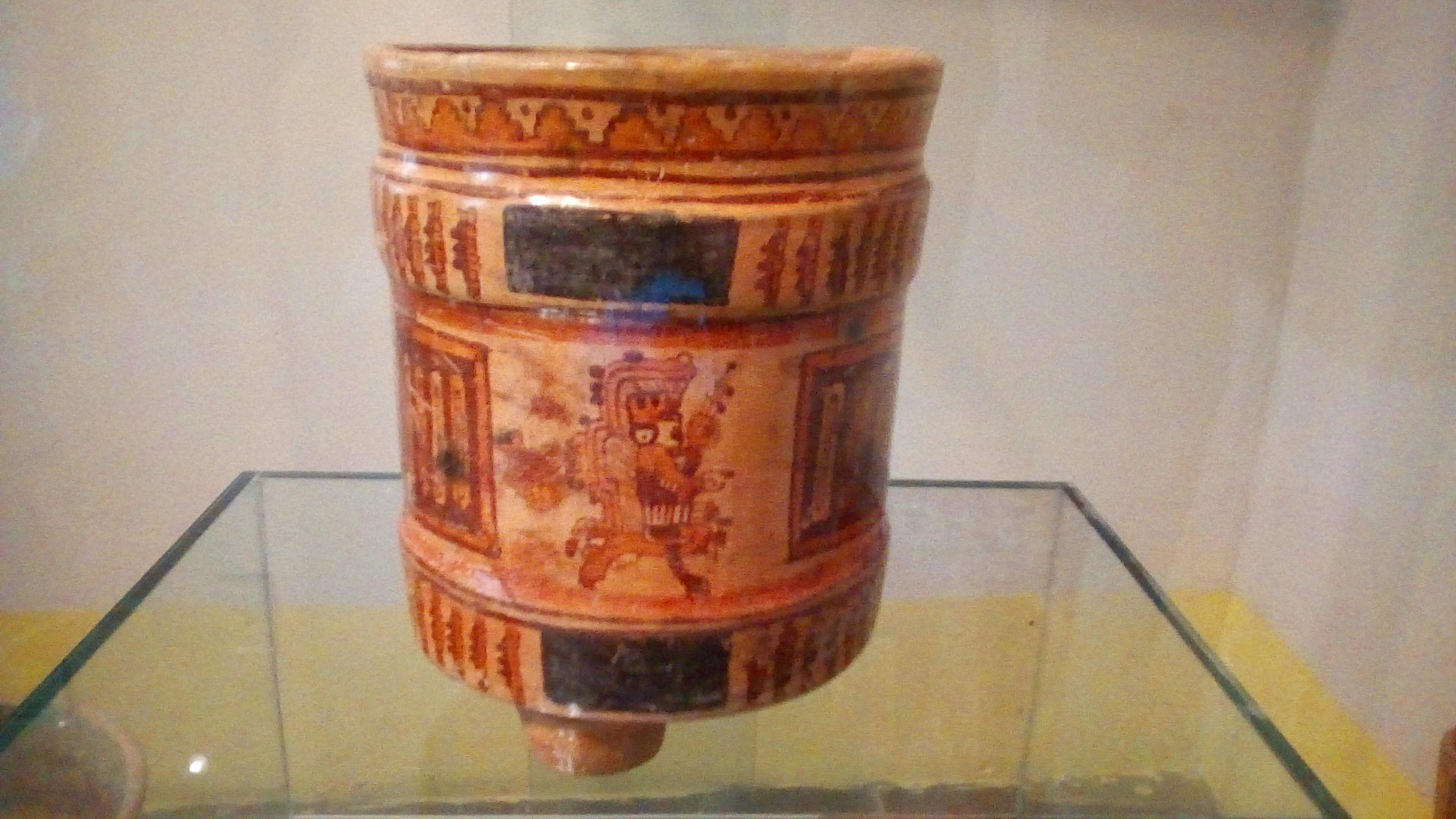
Lencan Urn

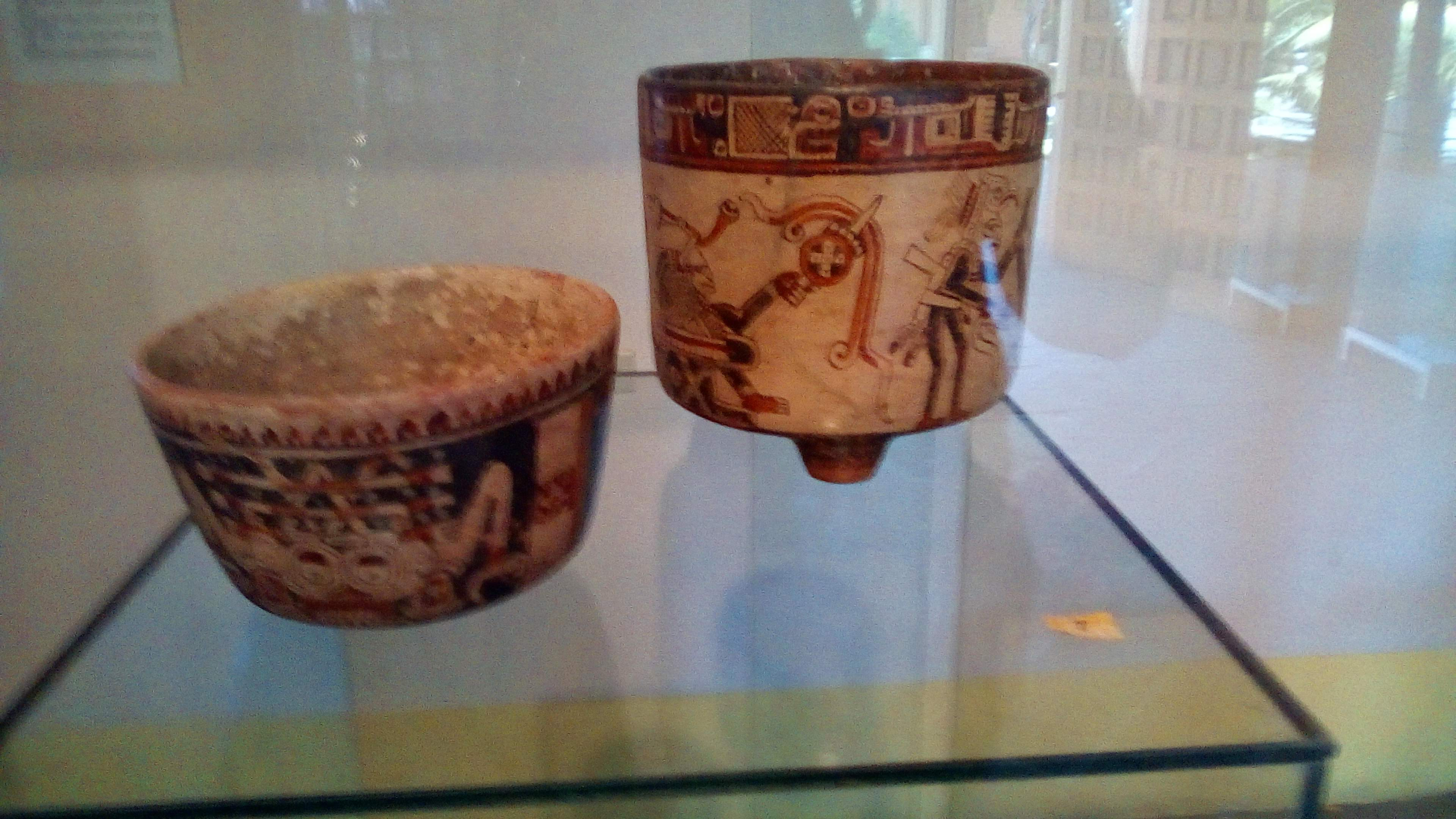
Lenca vessels from the Mesoamerican classical period.

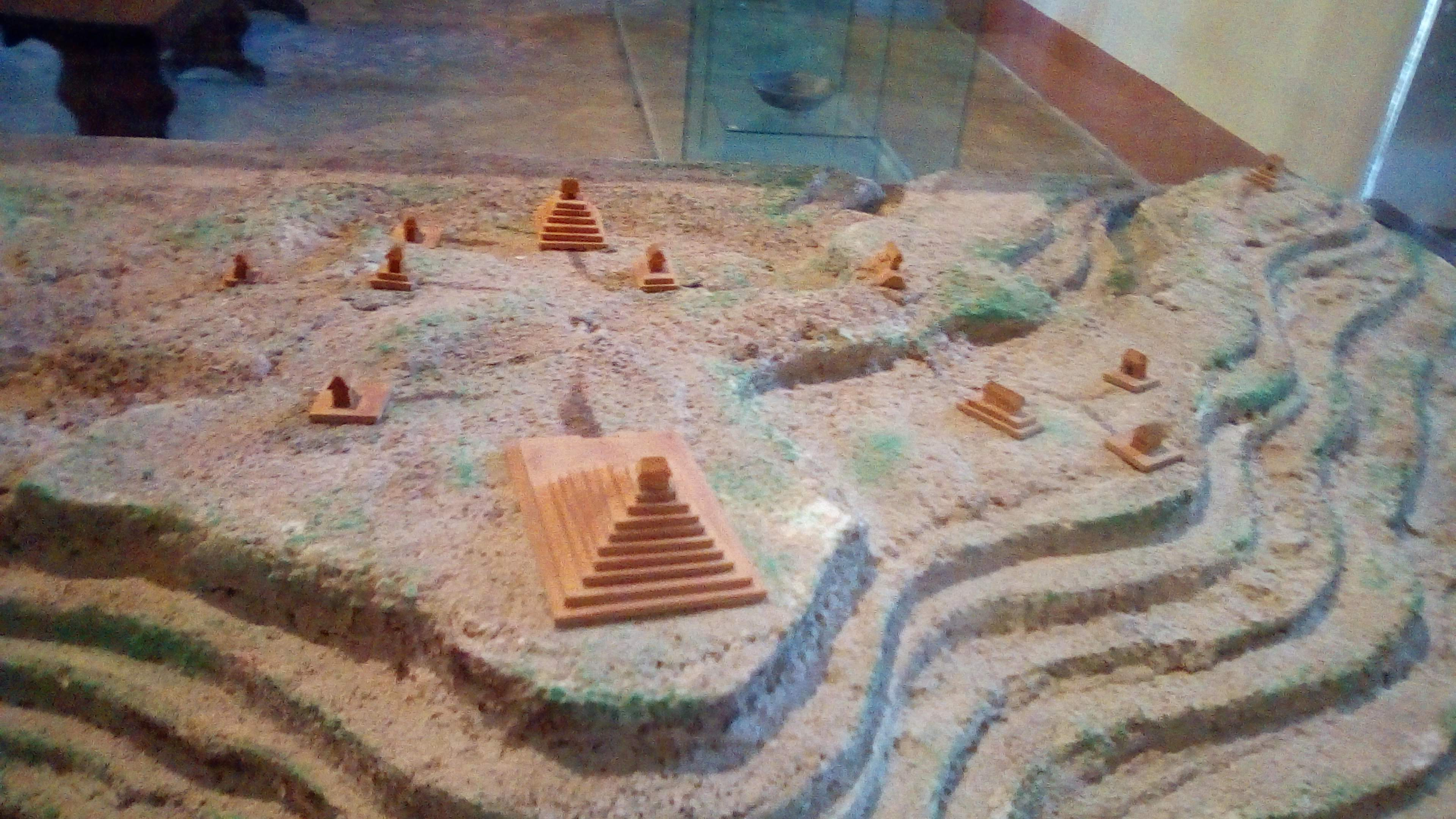
Yarumela model recreation

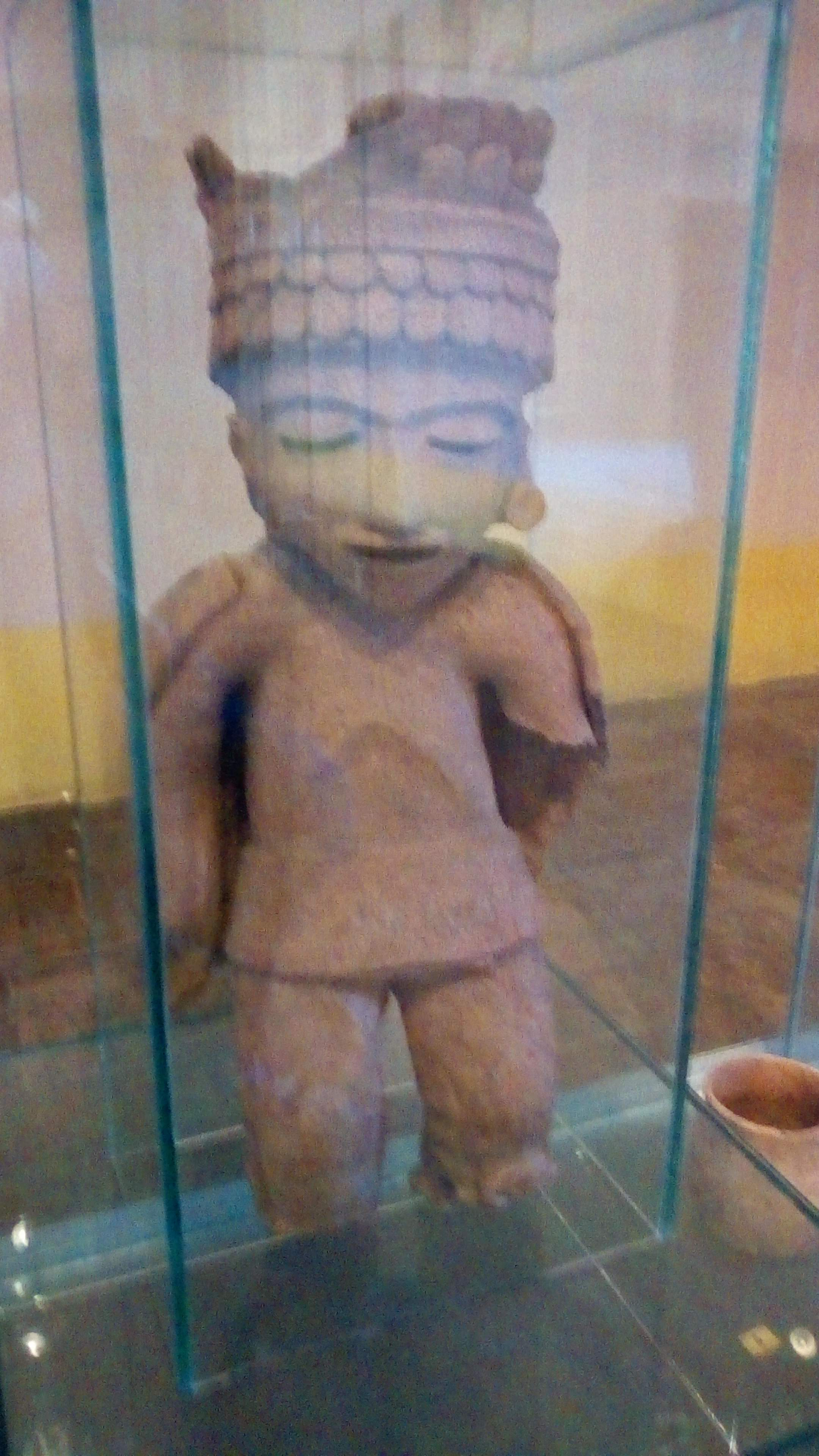
Lenca statue representing a cacique.

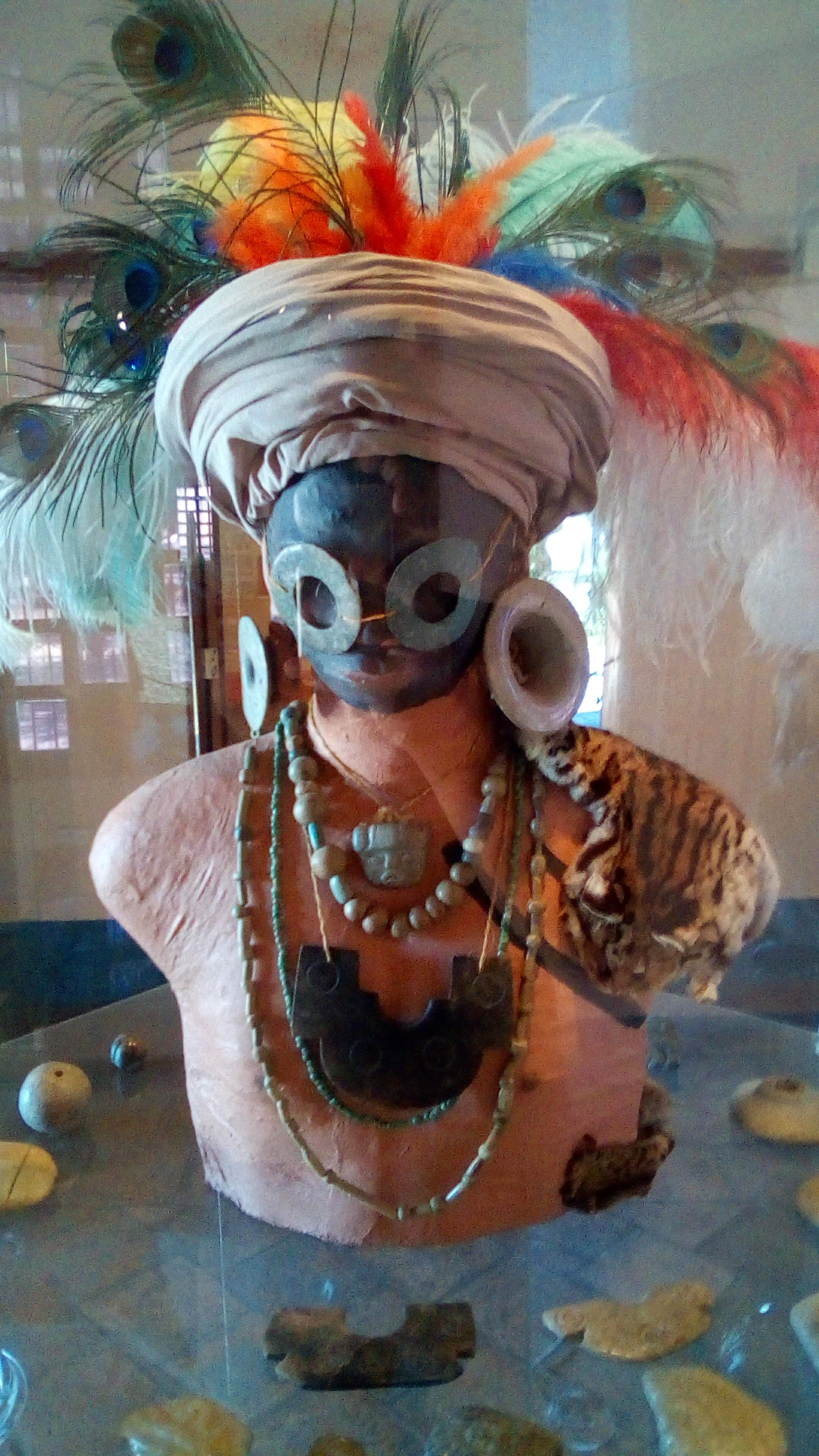
Recreation of a Lenca ruler.

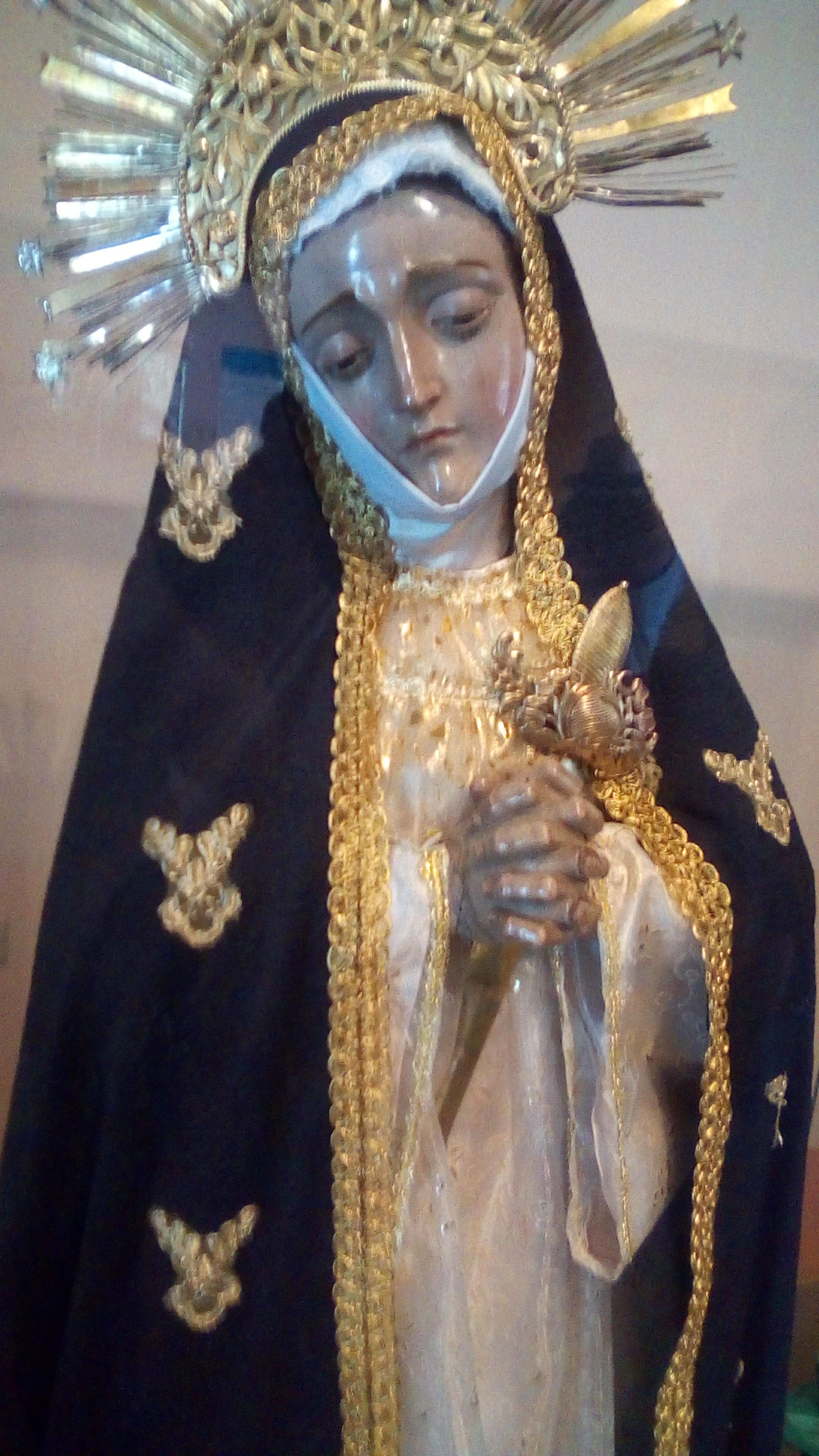
Virgin mary of the colonial period

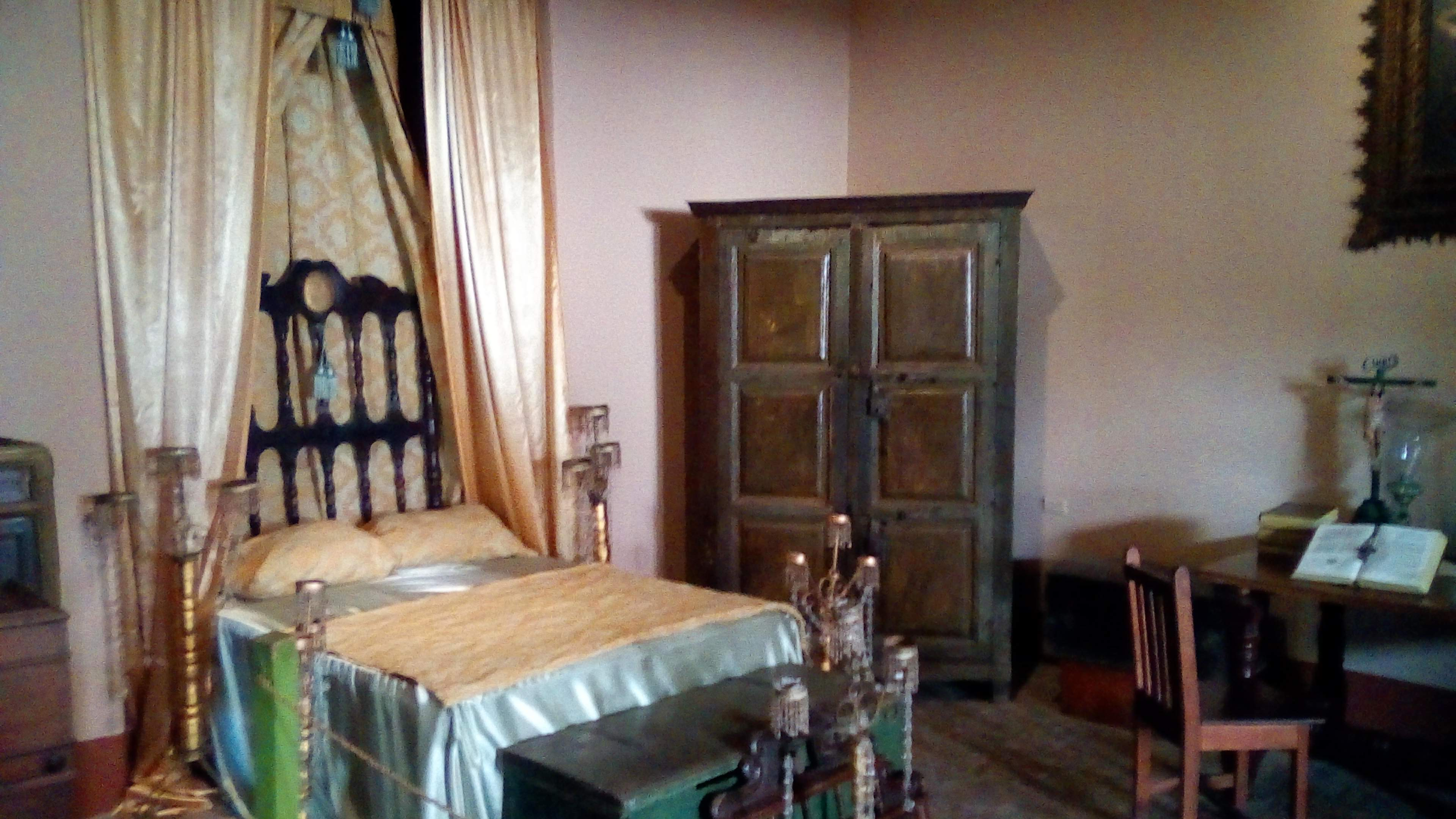
Recreation of a room of a criollo house with furniture of the time.

== See also ==
- History of Honduras
