= Wilson Popenoe =

American plant explorer (1892–1975)

Frederick Wilson Popenoe
- Born: March 9, 1892; Topeka, Kansas
- Died: June 20, 1975 (aged 83); Antigua Guatemala, Guatemala
- Occupation(s): botanist, agronomist
- Known for: cados
- Parent: Fred Oliver Popenoe Marion Bowman Popenoe
- Relatives: Paul Popenoe (brother)

Frederick Wilson Popenoe (March 9, 1892 – June 20, 1975) was an American Department of Agriculture employee and plant explorer. From 1916 to 1924, Popenoe explored Latin America to look for new strains of avocados. He reported his adventures to the National Geographic Society. He went to work for the U.S. Department of Agriculture in 1913 and became the chief agronomist of the United Fruit Company in 1925.

== Career ==
Popenoe attended Pomona College as a special student for one year. Afterwards, he worked for the United Fruit Company, where he became the first director of the Panamerican Agricultural School, Zamorano in Honduras. Popenoe won numerous awards and received three honorary doctorates, from: Universidad Mayor de San Marcos in Lima, Peru; Pomona College; and the University of Florida in Gainesville, Florida.

== Personal life ==
Popenoe was married to the British archeologist Dorothy Popenoe, who was involved in excavation of the Playa de los Muertos in Honduras. The standard author abbreviation Popenoe is used to indicate this person as the author when citing a botanical name.

His brother was agricultural explorer, eugenicist, and marriage counselor Paul Popenoe.

Wilson Popenoe died at Antigua Guatemala and is buried in the San Lazaro Cemetery there.

Popenoe's historic house and gardens, Casa Popenoe in Antigua Guatemala, is operated as historic house museum, where guided tours are conducted daily.
