= Dorothy Popenoe =

English botanist, archaeologist, and scientific illustrator (1899-1932)

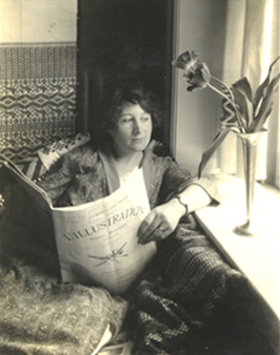
- Born: Dorothy Kate Hughes; 19 June 1899; Ashford, Middlesex, UK
- Died: 30 December 1932 (aged 33)
- Occupation: Archaeologist Botanist Scientific illustrator

Dorothy Popenoe (19 June 1899 – 30 December 1932; born Dorothy Kate Hughes) was an English archaeologist, botanist, and scientific illustrator.

Popenoe attended the Welsh Girls' School in Ashford until the beginning of World War I when she joined the Women's Land Army. In 1918, she began work at Kew Garden in London, England as an assistant to Dr. Otto Knapf. During this time, she also studied botany at the University of London, becoming an expert in grasses. In July 1923, she accepted an invitation from Agnes Chase to join the staff of the United States National Herbarium in the Office of Foreign Plant Introduction. She conducted numerous studies on cultivated bamboo. Through her work in Washington, D.C., she met the agricultural explorer and tropical fruit expert, Wilson Popenoe. They married on 17 November 1923.

In 1925, her husband accepted a position with the United Fruit Company as the director of agricultural experiments and moved the family to Tela on the Atlantic Coast of Honduras.

While in Honduras, Popenoe developed an interest in archaeology and worked on several Honduran archaeological sites, including the Maya fortress of Tenampa in 1927 and Cerro Palenque. Between 1928 and 1932 she excavated in the pre-Columbian cemetery at Playa de los Muertos.

However, she could not complete her work because, in December 1932, she ate an unripe, uncooked akee fruit, which is believed to have poisoned her, and as a result, she died.

The results of her excavations at Playas de los Muertos were published posthumously in 1934. Archaeologist Doris Stone included her analysis of the materials Popenoe excavated in her 1941 work "Archaeology of the North Coast of Honduras."

== Selected publications ==
- The ruins of Tenampua, Honduras 1936
