= Doris Zemurray Stone =

American archaeologist and ethnographer (1909–1994)

- Born: Doris Zemurray; November 19, 1909; New Orleans, Louisiana, U.S.
- Died: October 21, 1994 (aged 84); Covington, Louisiana, U.S.
- Occupations: archaeologist and ethnographer
- Spouse: Roger Thayer Stone (m. 1930; died 1983)
- Children: 2
- Parent: Sam Zemurray (father)

Doris Zemurray Stone (November 19, 1909 – October 21, 1994) was an American archaeologist and ethnographer, specializing in pre-Columbian Mesoamerica and the so-called "Intermediate Area" of lower Central America. She served as the director of the National Museum of Costa Rica and endowed numerous professorial chairs in U.S. universities.

== Biography ==
Born 1909 in New Orleans, Louisiana, Doris Zemurray was the daughter of Samuel Zemurray, a.k.a. Sam the Banana man, a Jewish immigrant who founded the Cuyamel Fruit Company the following year. He built the company into a successful venture, later famously selling it to the United Fruit Company giant in 1930 only to subsequently engineer a reverse takeover of sorts, serving as the latter's director in a profitable, if controversial, tenure from 1933 to 1952.

In 1917 Zemurray purchased and moved his family into a three-storey Beaux Arts mansion on St. Charles Avenue facing Tulane University, which would become the family home for the next four decades. In the early 1960s the mansion was transferred to Tulane where it became the residency of the university's presidents.

Doris Zemurray attended Radcliffe College in Cambridge, Massachusetts, where she majored in anthropology, and also pursued graduate studies in archaeology. She graduated in 1930. During her studies she met and married Roger Thayer Stone, a physics student at Union College, Schenectady, New York.

The year after graduating Doris Stone joined the Department of Middle American Research at Tulane University, which later became the Middle American Research Institute (MARI). Over the next eight years Stone was employed initially as a research associate in ethnography, and then as an associate in archaeology.

In 1939 shortly before the outbreak of World War II Doris Stone and her husband moved to Costa Rica, where Roger had business interests in a coffee plantation operating in Curridabat, outside of the capital San José. Stone would remain based there and in Central America for the next two decades, returning to New Orleans after her father's death and her husband's retirement from the plantation business, in 1961.

With her husband Roger Thayer Stone, she co-founded the Stone Center for Latin American Studies at Tulane University.

Stone was awarded an honorary Doctor of Letters degree in 1973 by Union College NY, her husband's alma mater.

In her last decades Doris served as president of the Zemurray Foundation, the funding agency supporting educational and cultural programs established through the legacy of her father. Her husband Roger had been foundation president up until his death in 1983.

Stone died in Covington, Louisiana on October 21, 1994, at the age of eighty-four.
