= Clementine (given name) =

- Gender: Female

Origin
- Language: Latin
- Meaning: merciful
- Region of origin: France

Other names
- Alternative spelling: Clémentine
- Derivatives: Clem, Clemmie, Clemence, Clementia, Clementina, Tina

Clémentine or Clementine is a French feminine form of Clement. The name has been in use in English-speaking countries since the 19th century. In the United States, the name has associations with Oh My Darling, Clementine, a traditional American, tragic but sometimes comic, Western folk ballad and with the citrus fruit named in honor of Clément Rodier, a French missionary who first discovered and propagated the cultivar in Algeria.

== Usage ==
Clémentine, the French form of the name, has been well-used in France and was among the top 500 most common names between 1900 and 1953 and again between 1973 and 2023. It was most popular between 1900 and 1911 and between 1986 and 2007, when it was among the top 100 names for girls in France.

Clementine has been among the 1,000 most common names for girls in the United Kingdom since 1996. It was among the top 1000 names for girls in the United States between 1880 and 1953 and again between 2014 and 2025.

== People ==
Notable people with the name include:

=== Royalty ===
- Princess Clémentine of Belgium (1872–1955)
- Princess Clémentine of Orléans (1817–1907)

=== Single name ===
- Clémentine (musician) (born 1963), French singer-songwriter based in Japan
- Clementine (musician) (born 1976), Filipino singer, lead vocalist for Oranges and Lemons

=== With surname ===
- Clementine Abel (1826–1905), German writer
- Clémentine Autain (born 1973), French politician
- Clementine Barnabet (c. 1894 – c. 1923), African-American serial killer and mass murderer
- Clémentine Célarié (born 1957), French actress
- Clementine Churchill, Baroness Spencer-Churchill (1885–1977), wife of Sir Winston Churchill
- Clementine de Vere (1888–1973), Belgium-born magician & illusionist known as Ionia
- Clémentine Delait (1865–1939), French bearded lady who kept a café
- Clémentine Delauney (born 1987), French singer, vocalist for the symphonic metal band Visions of Atlantis
- Clémentine Deliss (born 1960), researcher
- Clementine Deymann, (1844–1896), German-American priest and prison chaplain
- Clementine Douglas (born 1998), American singer-songwriter
- Clementine Ford (born 1979), American actress
- Clementine Ford (born 1981), Australian writer
- Clémentine de Giuli (born 1993), Swiss archer
- Clementine Hunter (c. 1886/1887–1988), African American self-taught folk artist
- Clementine Jacoby, American software engineer and criminal justice reform activist
- Clémentine Shakembo Kamanga (born 1952), Congolese diplomat and writer
- Clementine Krauss (1877–1938), Austrian ballerina, singer, actress, and director
- Clementine Lynch (in religion, Mary Scholastica; 1754–1799), Irish Catholic nun who served as abbess of the Benedictine convent in Ypres, Belgium, during the French Revolution
- Clementine Mukeka, Rwandan Permanent Secretary of the Ministry of Foreign Affairs and International Cooperation
- Clémentine Nzuji (born 1944), Congolese poet and linguist
- Clementine Paddleford (1898–1967), American food writer
- Clémentine Solignac (1894–2008), French supercentenarian
- Clementine Stoney (born 1981), Australian swimmer
- Marie-Clémentine Valadon (better known as Suzanne Valadon; 1865–1938), French artist and Renoir's art model

== Fictional characters ==
- Clementine, Gwyneth Paltrow’s character in Hard Eight
- Clementine, a main character in the video game series The Walking Dead
- Clementine, a character on HBO's 2016 series Westworld, former madam of "Mariposa" brothel
- Clementine, heroine of a series of children's books (2006–2015) by Sara Pennypacker
- Clementine, a Muppet character on Sesame Street
- Clementine, in the television series Caillou
- Clementine, a robotic NPC character from the 2022 video game Stray
- Dr. Clementine Chasseur, a character on the 2012 television series Hemlock Grove
- Clementine Hughes, a recurring role in the 2015 American sitcom Life in Pieces played by Hunter King.
- Clementine Johnson, a minor character on the television series Reno 911!
- Clementine Kruczynski, a role played by Kate Winslet in Eternal Sunshine of the Spotless Mind (2004)

== See also ==
- Clemence, a given name and surname
- Clement (disambiguation)
- Clementina (disambiguation)
- Clementine (disambiguation)
