= Clementina (given name) =

Clementina is a feminine given name (derivative of Clement). Notable people with the name include:

- Patricia Clementina (fl. 590), politically active aristocrat in Byzantine Naples
- Clementina Agricole (born 1988), Seychellois weightlifter
- Archduchess Clementina of Austria (1798–1881), Austrian archduchess
- Archduchess Maria Clementina of Austria (1777–1801), Austrian archduchess
- Clementina Batalla (1894–1987), Mexican lawyer
- Clementina Black (1853–1922), English writer
- Clementina Butler (1862–1949), American evangelist and author
- Clementina Curci (1952–1990), Italian housewife murdered in Singapore
- Clementina Díaz y de Ovando (1916–2012), Mexican writer
- Clementina Drummond-Willoughby, 24th Baroness Willoughby de Eresby (1809–1888), British baroness
- Clementina Forleo (born 1963), Italian judge
- Clementina D. Griffin (1886–1980), American educator
- Clementina de Jesus (1901–1987), Brazilian samba singer
- Clementina Maude, Viscountess Hawarden (1822–1865), English portrait amateur photographer
- Clementina Mulenga, a.k.a. Cleo Ice Queen (born 1989), Zambian born hip hop recording artist
- Clementina Otero (1909–1996), Mexican actress
- Clementina Panella, Italian archeologist
- Clementina Poto Langone (1896–1964), civil leader
- Clementina Rind (1740–1774), first female newspaper printer
- Clementina Robertson (1795–1853), Irish painter
- Maria Clementina Sobieska (1702–1735), Queen consort of England
- Clementina Suárez (1902–1991), Honduran writer
- Clementina Tompkins (1848–1931), US painter
- Clementina Trenholme (1843–1918), US author
- Clementina Walkinshaw (1720–1802), mistress of Bonnie Prince Charlie
