= Juticalpa =

- Municipality
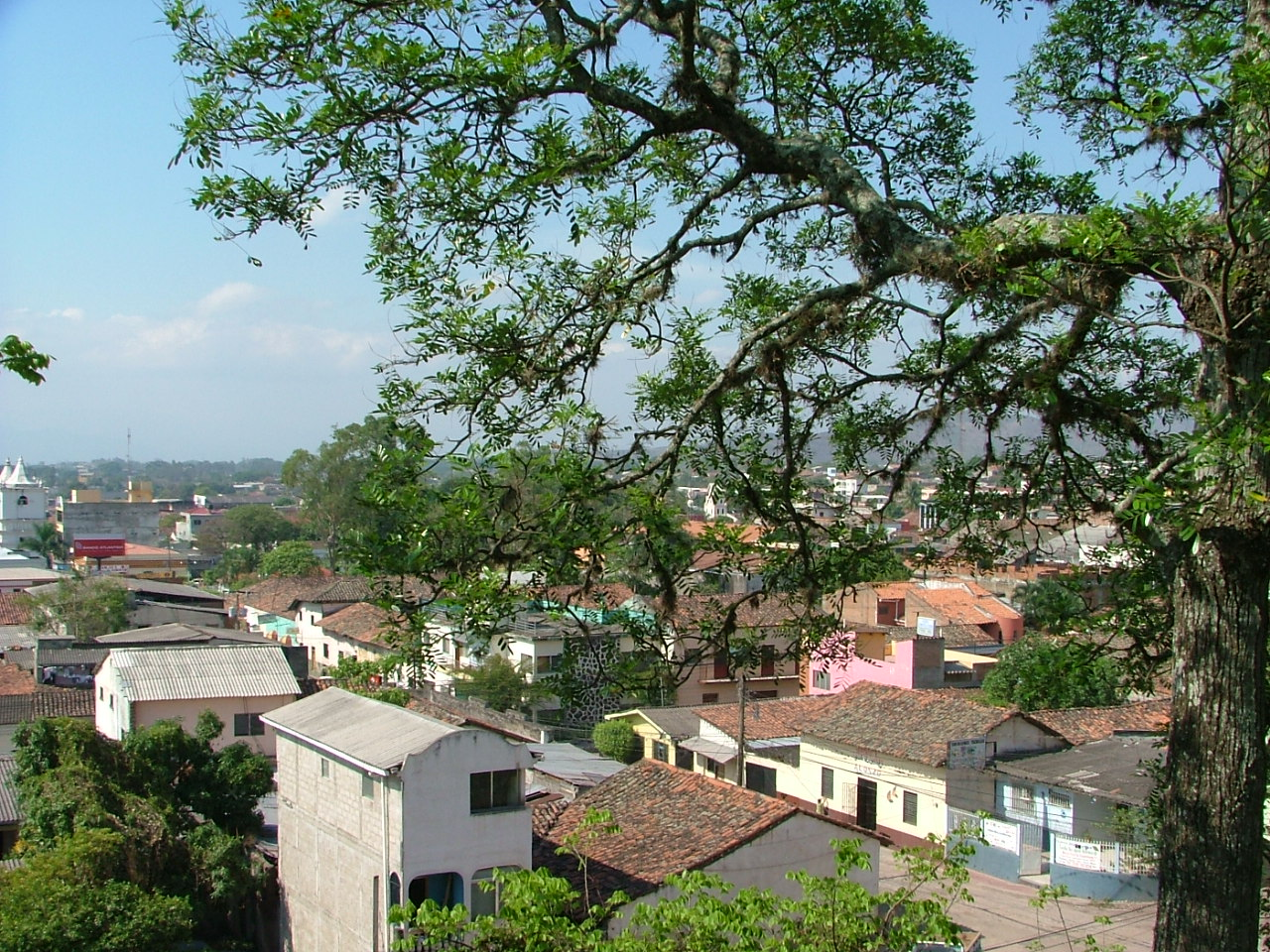
- Overlooking Barrio El Centro from La Cruz

- Flag Coat of arms

- Location within Honduras
- Coordinates: 14°39′59″N 86°13′07″W
- Country: Honduras
- Department: Olancho

Government
  - Alcalde (Mayor): Walner Castro

Area
  - Municipality: 2,605 km^{2} (1,006 sq mi)
- Elevation: 410 m (1,350 ft)

Population (2023 projection)
  - Municipality: 150,211
  - Density: 57.66/km^{2} (149.3/sq mi)
  - Urban: 89,837
- Climate: Aw

Juticalpa (Spanish pronunciation: [xutiˈkalpa]) is the capital of Olancho Department in Honduras, with a population of 75,790 (2023 calculation), and the municipal seat of Juticalpa Municipality. Situated in a broad river valley alongside the Rio Juticalpa, the town is a commercial centre for much of Olancho's ranching and agricultural economy.

Its Catedral de la Inmaculada Concepción, devoted to the immaculate Conception, is the cathedral episcopal see of the suffragan Roman Catholic Diocese of Juticalpa.

== Geography ==
The Juticalpa area encompasses the Guayape River valley, bordered by the Sierra de Agalta range.

Among the most notable of the small villages in the area is La Concepción and La Empalizada. The nearest town is Catacamas, 30 miles to the northeast.

=== Climate ===
The climate is significantly warmer than Tegucigalpa or nearby Campamento because of the Valle de Juticalpa's elevation. Several thunderstorms occur during the period of May through September (wet season). October, November and December are cooler and often cloudy with drizzle. From January through April, the region receives very little rain (Dry Season). During this season field fires are often observed, some are intentionally created due to an old unlawful practice for renewing crops, and others are the result of severe heat or arson; these fires create a thick blanket of smoke that settles over the Juticalpa Valley for almost a month. The air improves after the first rain. During the rainy season, the incidence of dengue fever is quite high due to the many mud puddles that become breeding grounds for mosquitoes.

== Layout ==
The town is divided into twelve major neighbourhoods, called Barrios or "Colonias": Barrio El Centro, Barrio de Jesús, Barrio Calona, Barrio La Hoya, Barrio Belén, Colonia San Miguel, Barrio El Portillo, Barrio El Campo, Colonia El Campo Uno, Colonia El Campo Dos, Barrio El Cementerio, Barrio El Chicle and Barrio de la Cruz. The majority of town lies on a gradual slope on the southwestern side of the Juticalpa river. There are many smaller communities in the surrounding area. Juticalpa's sister city, Catacamas, is located at the easternmost terminus of the paved Olancho highway.

The Boulevard Los Poetas connects Barrio El Centro to the Olancho highway and receives Honduran intercity bus traffic. The main bus station is located at the beginning of the "Boulevard Los Poetas" and several bus companies serve all of Olancho's 23 counties or "municipios". Two bus companies, Discovery and Aurora, send regular and executive service buses to Tegucigalpa and Catacamas.

Juticalpa also has two public parks, Parque Central located in Barrio El Centro with the cathedral dedicated to the Virgin of Concepción on one side, and the city hall (alcaldía) on the opposite side. The second smaller park Parque Infantil is located in Barrio Belén across the Santa Clara school.

Remnants of pre-Columbian civilisations can be found occasionally in Barrio Belén.

== Demographics ==
At the time of the 2013 Honduras census, Juticalpa municipality had a population of 124,828. Of these, 91.20% were Mestizo, 6.71% White, 1.05% Black or Afro-Honduran, 0.43% Indigenous and 0.60% others.

== Economy ==
Juticalpa's economy is primarily agricultural and commercial. Olancho's wide, fertile river valleys support maize, cattle and dairy farms. Queso Olanchano a hard and salty cheese, and "Mantequilla Crema" white cream, are produced in great quantities at several dairies and exported throughout the country, the Central American region, and United States. Because of its proximity to successful farms and its position on the only paved highway in Olancho, Juticalpa's economy has led to relative prosperity.

Despite its strong agricultural base, unemployment in Juticalpa is high. To support themselves, many citizens of Juticalpa run small stores called pulperías where they sell household items and food stores to neighbors.

Juticalpa contains a number of small businesses, many restaurants (ranging from taco stands to dine-in establishments with air conditioning), a hospital donated by the Japanese government, medical clinics, and a number of public and private schools. ATMs are easily found throughout the town and inside local bank branches. A new mall opened at the beginning of Boulevard Los Poetas, and four fully supplied supermarkets are well distributed across town. Recent road paving projects were finished in Barrio El Centro and Barrio de Jesús, but most of the town peripheral streets remain unpaved.

The area serves as a transit hub for the tourists headed to The Sierra de Agalta National Park, and for tourists visiting The Cuevas de Talgua, limestone caves containing the calcified phosphorescent remains of ancient inhabitants of the area.

In Honduras, Juticalpa is most famous for the production of an alcoholic palm Coyol tree wine known as coyol wine. Residents knock down palm trees in the middle of the dry season (March and April) and enjoy the wine at the sites, or transport the beverage to the marketplace in plastic bottles. The easiest place to find the drink is in the village of La Concepción, a few kilometers west of Juticalpa on the highway to Tegucigalpa.

== Education ==
The city is served by various public and private schools, high schools and universities. One private bilingual school is Day Star School School, started by two Americans from Minnesota that serves pre-kindergarten to 12th grade.

== Culture and entertainment ==
=== City fair ===
Juticalpa's fair is celebrated on 8–14 December and is dedicated to "The Virgin of Concepción". During this period several activities take place across the city's main streets, at the Parque Central and at the AGAO "Asociación de Ganaderos y Agricultores de Olancho".

=== Gastronomy ===
Being the commercial centre of Olancho, Juticalpa is able to offer a variety of local cuisine based on fresh produce, dairy and meat. Typical dishes include Carne Asada (one of the best offered in the country), the renowned Tapado Olanchano, Yuca con Chicharrón, Baleadas, Tacos, Tajaditas, Enchiladas, Pastelitos de Carne, and other local delicacies. Rosquillas, quesadillas and hojaldras are corn and cheese based; due to the extensive cheese resources, and the high production of corn in the area, the best are found in Juticalpa, specifically in the village of La Concepción. In late years tilapia farms have been a success in the area, giving way to popularity and availability of fresh tilapia fish in many of Juticalpa's restaurants.

=== Sports ===
The city's football team is Juticalpa F.C., nicknamed "Los Canecheros", the stadium is called Juan Ramón Brevé Vargas.

== People from Juticalpa ==
- Porfirio Lobo Sosa, (Born in 1947) Honduran President 2010–2014, Economics Professor and Politician.
- Froylán Turcios, (1875–1943) Honduran writer, journalist and politician.
- Clementina Suárez, (1902–1991) Honduran poet

== See also ==
- Immaculate Conception Cathedral, Juticalpa
