= Tomás Andrés Mauro Muldoon =

American Roman Catholic prelate (1938–2024)

Most Reverend Tomás Andrés Mauro Muldoon, OFM OFM
- Bishop Emeritus of Juticalpa
- Church: Roman Catholic Church
- Metropolis: Tegucigalpa
- Diocese: Juticalpa
- Installed: 1 February 1983
- Term ended: 2 February 2012
- Predecessor: Nicholas D'Antonio Salza, OFM
- Successor: Joe Bonello, OFM

Orders
- Ordination: 11 June 1966 by Bernardino Nicola Mazzarella, OFM
- Consecration: 8 October 1984 by Bernard Francis Law

Personal details
- Born: Tomás Andrés Mauro Muldoon; 8 August 1938 Boston, Massachusetts, U.S.
- Died: 14 June 2024 (aged 85) Framingham, Massachusetts, U.S.
- Denomination: Roman Catholic

Styles of Tomás Andrés Mauro Muldoon
- Reference style: His Excellency; The Most Reverend
- Spoken style: Your Excellency
- Religious style: Bishop

Tomás Andrés Mauro Muldoon, OFM (8 August 1938 – 14 June 2024) was an American Roman Catholic prelate, who served in Honduras. He was bishop of Juticalpa from 1983 to 2012. He died in Framingham, Massachusetts, on 14 June 2024, at the age of 85.

Catholic Church titles
Preceded by Nicholas D'Antonio Salza, OFM	Bishop of Juticalpa; 1983–2012	Succeeded by Joe Bonello, OFM
