= Catacamas =

Catacamas Cata
- Municipality
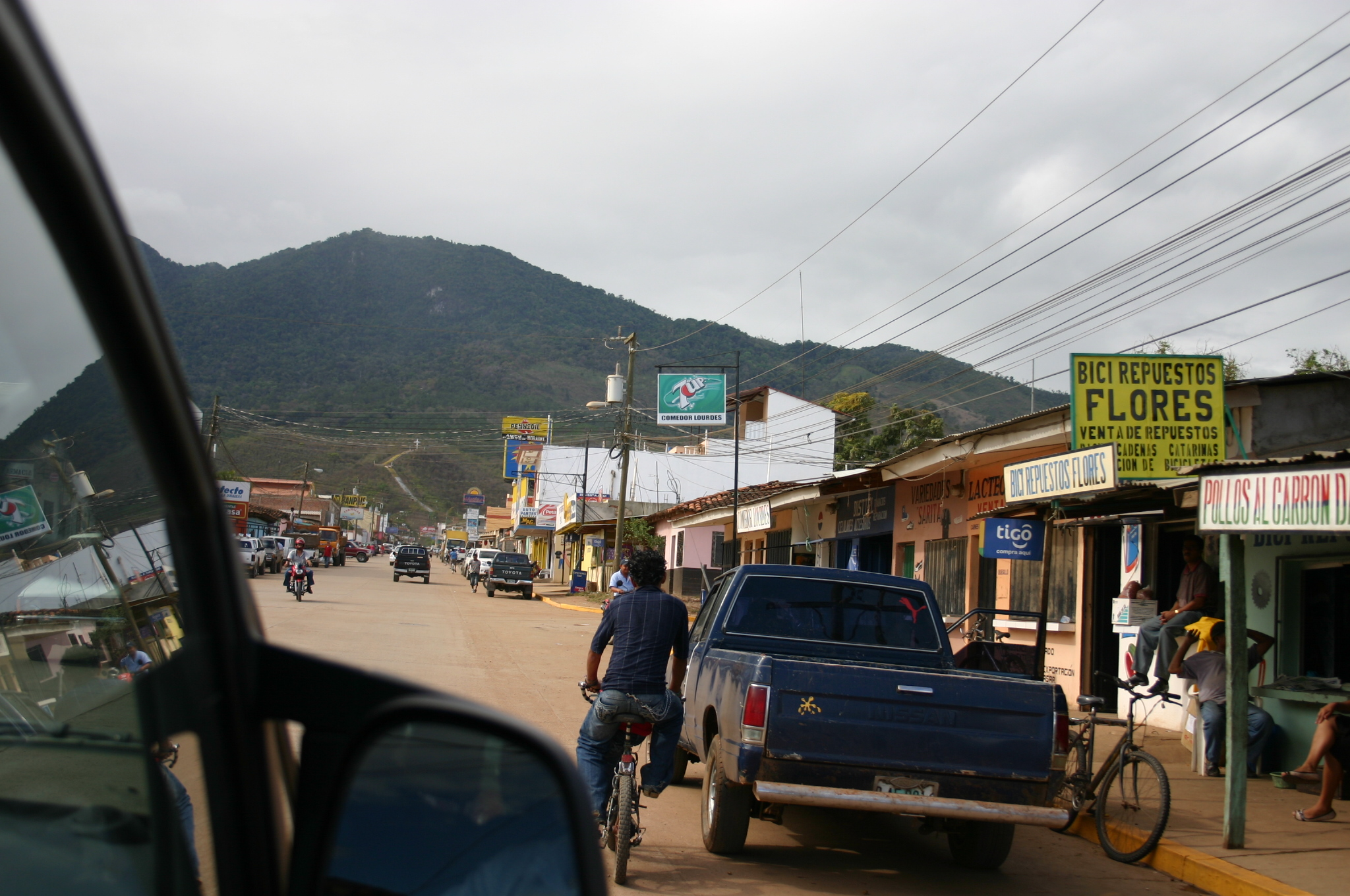
- A street scene in central Catacamas -the 'Mirador de la Cruz' is visible in the background

- Location within Honduras
- Coordinates: 14°48′N 85°54′W
- Country: Honduras
- Department: Olancho
- Founded: 24 January 1898; 128 years ago

Government
  - Type: Municipality
  - Governor: Lincoln Figueroa

Area
  - Municipality: 7,264 km^{2} (2,805 sq mi)
- Elevation: 450 m (1,480 ft)

Population (2023 projection)
  - Municipality: 140,548
  - Density: 19.35/km^{2} (50.11/sq mi)
  - Urban: 63,310
- Time zone: UTC-UTC/GMT -6 hours
- Climate: Aw/Tropical savanna
- Website: Official website

Catacamas is a city and municipality in the Olancho Department of Honduras, situated in a valley about 210 kilometres (130 mi) north-east of Tegucigalpa. The municipality had a projected population of 140,548 in 2023, including an urban population of 63,310.

The local economy includes agriculture, livestock production, trade and services, with coffee, maize, beans, dairy products and meat among its principal products. Catacamas has a tropical wet and dry climate and is near the Talgua Caves, an archaeological site containing pre-Columbian human burials known for the calcite deposits that give some of the remains a glowing appearance.

== Overview ==
Catacamas, called the Florida City by the great poet and writer Froylán Turcios, extends over a vast plain irrigated by the Rio Guayape in the heart of the luxuriant department of Olancho.

The city is situated 210 kilometers northeast of the Honduran capital, Tegucigalpa, and is easily accessible by paved road. Catacamas has historically been characterized by the hospitality, resilience, and progressive spirit of its people, as well as its rich natural setting which is suitable for both agricultural and forest production.

It is located in a valley 450 meters above sea level. The North White Stone Mountain, part of Agalta Mountains National Park, is located near the city. Catacamas is home to a variety of botanical species such as conifers, broadleaf plants, and some 80 varieties of orchids, as well as a rich fauna, including wild cats and the quetzal.

To the north and west are the mountains "Cerro de la Cruz" and the hill "El Cuartel", among others, where panoramic views of the city, including the sports centre and cultural park "Ramón Díaz López", can be seen.

Approximately five km to the east of Catacamas, one can find the world-famous Talgua Caves (Cuevas de Talgua) discovered in 1935. A recent discovery in the caves is that of the "Glowing Skulls," Pech Indian skeletons from approximately three thousand years ago.

About 6 km to the south of Catacamas runs the Guayape gold, which forms the river Guayambre Patuca, the second longest river in Honduras (the longest being the Segovia). Between the two rivers stretches the Cordillera Entre Ríos, which is part of the Municipality of Catacamas.

Catacamas and Olancho have many characteristics in common: they are the municipality and the largest department of Honduras. Catacamas’ area is 7228.5 square kilometres.

The city of Catacamas is located at 14°54'04" north latitude and 85°, 55', 31", Meridian Greenwich. Gualaco lies to the north, San Esteban and Dulce Nombre de Culmí to the south, with Patuca and Las Trojes. To the east lay Dulce Nombre de Culmí and the department of Jinotega, Nicaragua, and west is Santa María del Real, San Francisco de Becerra and Juticalpa. The Talgua River runs to the east of the town before joining the Guayape.

The Catholic Church "San Francisco de Asis" is one of the main focal points in the town, and stands across from the municipal building. At the centre of Catacamas city is the Parque Central, a focal point of town life.

Villages within Catacamas municipality include El Esquilinchuche on the banks of the Guayape river.

== Demographics ==
At the time of the 2013 Honduras census, Catacamas municipality had a population of 117,493. Of these, 94.73% were Mestizo, 3.94% White, 0.69% Black or Afro-Honduran, 0.47% Indigenous and 0.17% others.

== Gallery ==
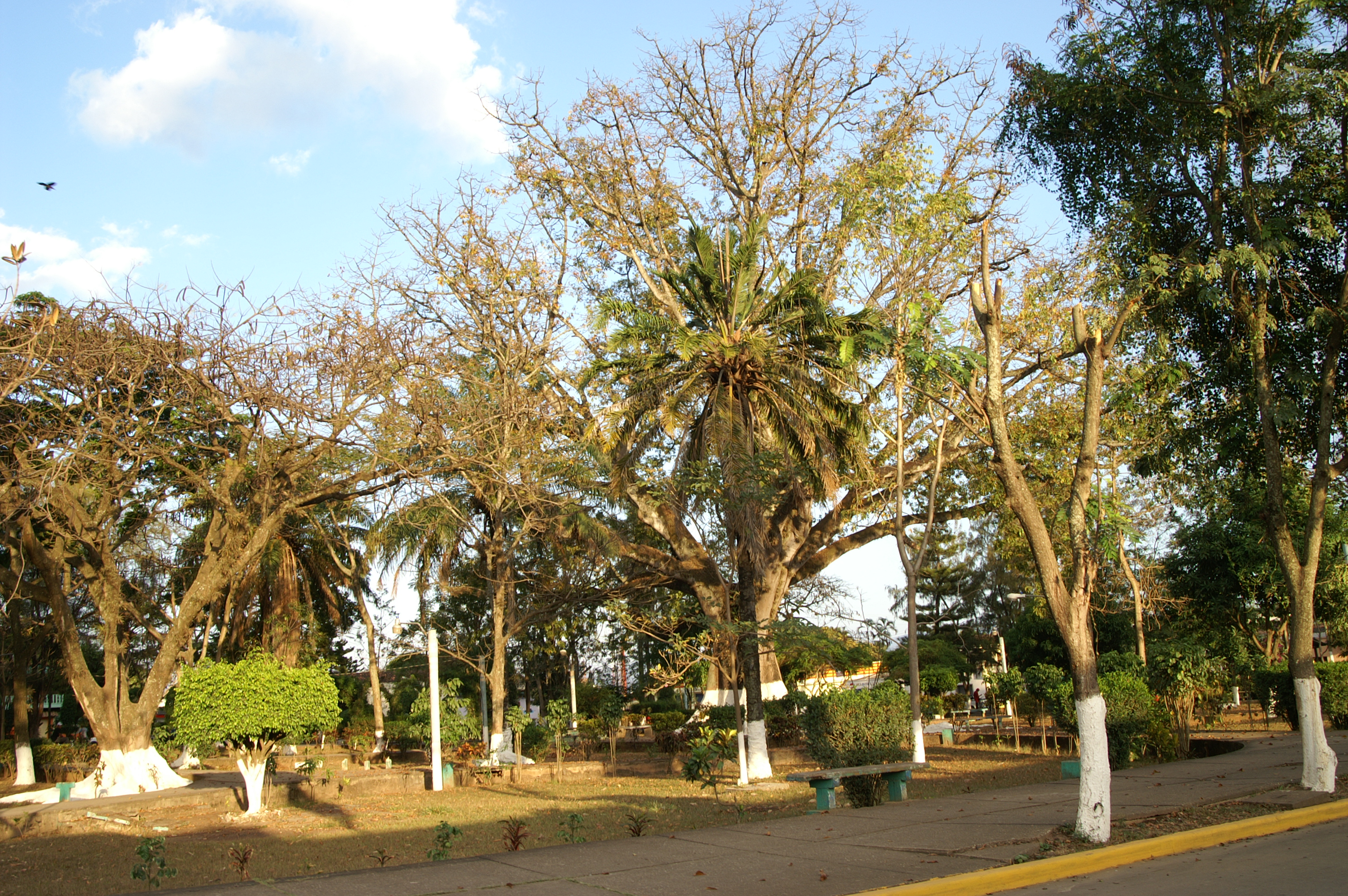
Parque Central in Catacamas -for size reference the trunk of the central tree is 14 feet across-

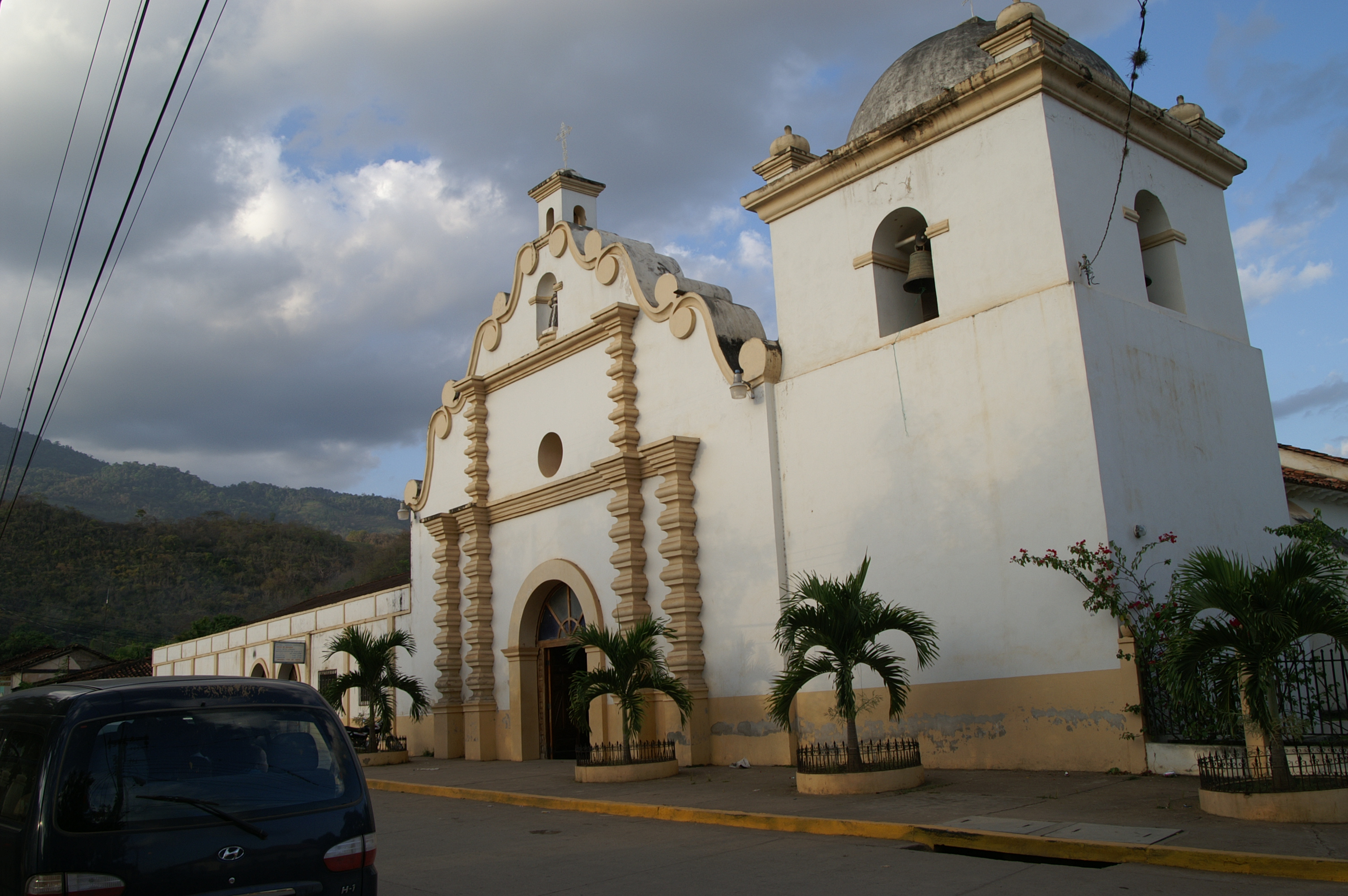
The Church in the centre of Catacamas, 'San Francisco de Asis'

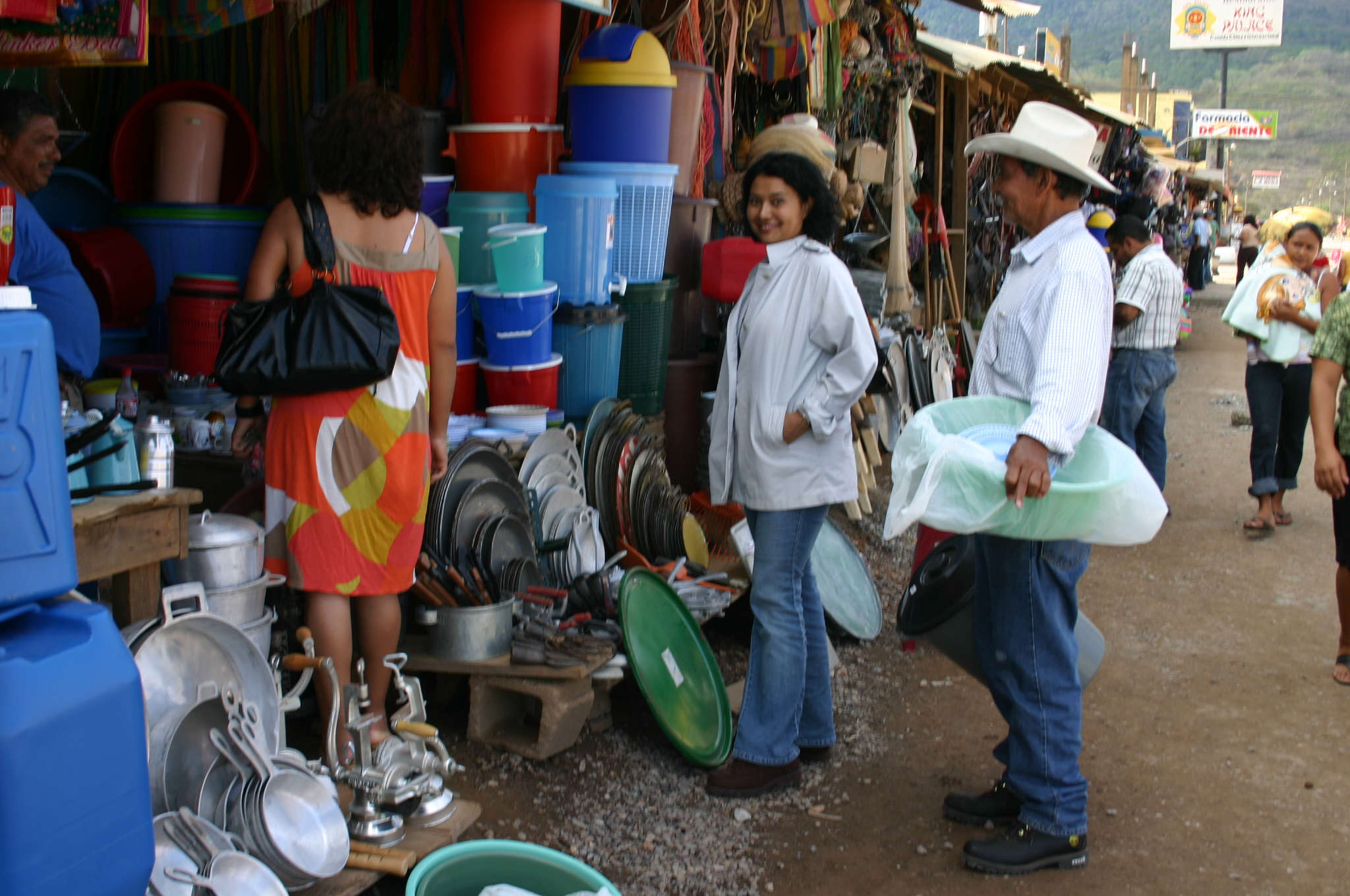
A picture of one of the many open-air markets in central Catacamas

== Climate ==
Catacamas has a Tropical wet and dry climate under the Köppen climate classification.

Climate data for Catacamas, Honduras
Month	Jan	Feb	Mar	Apr	May	Jun	Jul	Aug	Sep	Oct	Nov	Dec	Year
Record high °C (°F)	33.5 (92.3)	37.5 (99.5)	39.9 (103.8)	38.5 (101.3)	38.4 (101.1)	37.0 (98.6)	33.8 (92.8)	34.9 (94.8)	32.5 (90.5)	32.4 (90.3)	33.0 (91.4)	33.1 (91.6)	39.9 (103.8)
Mean daily maximum °C (°F)	28.5 (83.3)	29.6 (85.3)	31.3 (88.3)	32.3 (90.1)	32.4 (90.3)	30.5 (86.9)	29.7 (85.5)	30.3 (86.5)	30.5 (86.9)	30.4 (86.7)	29.2 (84.6)	28.4 (83.1)	30.3 (86.5)
Daily mean °C (°F)	22.9 (73.2)	23.9 (75.0)	25.6 (78.1)	26.8 (80.2)	27.0 (80.6)	25.6 (78.1)	24.9 (76.8)	25.1 (77.2)	25.4 (77.7)	24.8 (76.6)	23.8 (74.8)	23.1 (73.6)	24.9 (76.8)
Mean daily minimum °C (°F)	17.9 (64.2)	18.4 (65.1)	19.6 (67.3)	20.8 (69.4)	21.7 (71.1)	21.4 (70.5)	20.6 (69.1)	20.6 (69.1)	20.6 (69.1)	20.1 (68.2)	19.1 (66.4)	18.3 (64.9)	19.9 (67.8)
Record low °C (°F)	11.9 (53.4)	11.9 (53.4)	13.4 (56.1)	15.7 (60.3)	18.9 (66.0)	19.5 (67.1)	18.4 (65.1)	18.6 (65.5)	18.8 (65.8)	17.5 (63.5)	12.5 (54.5)	12.1 (53.8)	11.9 (53.4)
Average precipitation mm (inches)	42.4 (1.67)	26.3 (1.04)	20.5 (0.81)	37.5 (1.48)	137.2 (5.40)	245.4 (9.66)	234.0 (9.21)	184.5 (7.26)	198.9 (7.83)	153.8 (6.06)	76.1 (3.00)	52.6 (2.07)	1,409.2 (55.48)
Average precipitation days (≥ 1.0 mm)	6	5	3	3	9	17	19	25	16	13	9	8	133
Source: NOAA

== Infrastructure ==
In the recent years Catacamas has changed its appearance regarding street paving the urban area. A lot of streets were paved, and there are plans to continue the paving of new streets and boulevards.

Rural roads have been paved so that the mobilisation of products has become much more comfortable, for example, the route between the municipalities of Dulce Nombre de Culmí and Catacamas. This drive now only takes 45 minutes in a private vehicle.

=== Road and aerial infrastructure ===
The highway to the capital is paved the entire way with a lot of pot-holes (Catacamas – Tegucigalpa 210 km; approx. 4 hours ride) which connects to San Pedro Sula (Catacamas – SPS 545 km) and to the north coast. The road to Dulce Nombre de Culmi (Catacamas – Culmi 40 km) is dirt but is passable year round. As of 2019 the road is paved all the way to Culmí, but littered with substantial potholes.

In June 2011 a new airport should be opened in Aguacate, some kilometres in direction to Culmí.

=== Water and sanitation ===
Two oxidation ponds in use with one more in the planning stages. Dump where solid waste is burned. Solid waste burial dump in planning. Water sanitation plant that is not in use.

=== Communication ===
Telephone: Fixed telephone service provided by Hondutel; four cellular providers: Tigo, Claro, Digicel, Olanchocel. Television: Two cable television providers: Telecab and Cavicab; 5 local television stations: canal 30, canal 9, canal 21, canal 33, canal 40. Radio: 15 local radio stations and 1 national station (radio América).

=== Energy ===
An electric substation is under construction that will considerably better the energy service which is currently lacking due to increasing demand.

=== Health ===
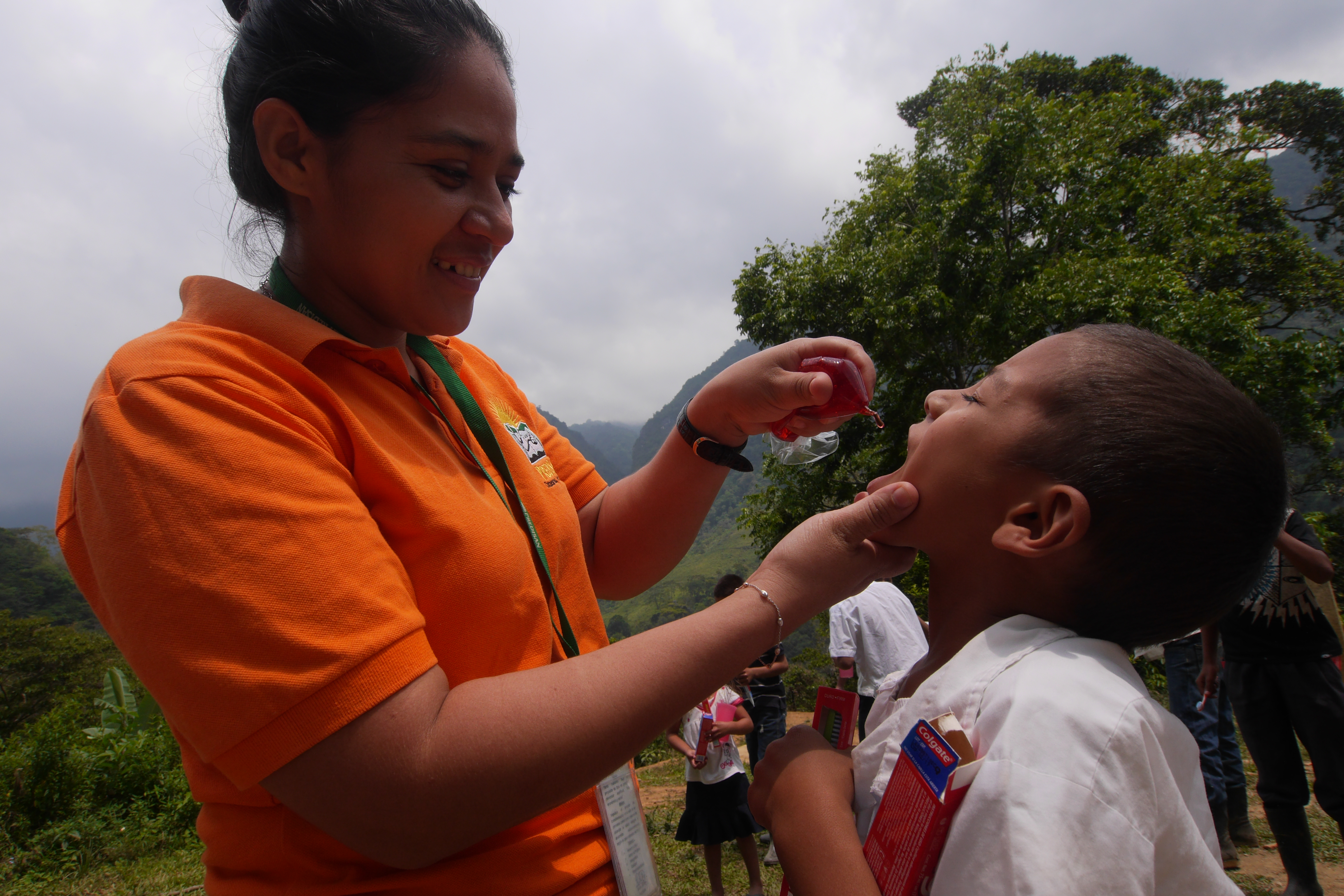
Aury Navarro, a Nursing Assistant with Predisan, pours a fluoridated rinse into the mouth of child in the rural mountain village of Esperanza in the Sierra Agalta Rainforest near Catacamas, Honduras.

Catacamas is served by several health centres. One clinic is in a barrio of Catacamas, and five are in the Sector Three mountain area east of Catacamas. The mountain clinics are operated in conjunction with the Honduran Secretary of Health.

A public health centre offers maternity services.

=== Ward and emergency services ===
A private, Catholic hospital is currently under construction. A public hospital is being solicited.

=== University ===
The Universidad Nacional de Agricultura UNA (National Agriculture University) is also located in Catcamas.

== Sports ==
The local football club is Atlético Olanchano, who play at the Estadio Rubén Guifarro. They have had a few seasons in the top tier of Honduran football but currently play in the Honduran second division.

== Economy ==
Catacamas is a town rich in dairy, meat and basic grains. Of the three sectors of the municipality: Primary (Agriculture, Livestock), Secondary (Industry) and Tertiary (Services and Trade), the last produces 45 percent of the gross value of production (GVP).

But the town is still dominated by its productive rural areas. The growing productive sub-sector has a gross production value of over 1.9 billion Lempiras annually. The main agricultural products include beans and corn as well as coffee and cassava. The main industrial products are the production of milk, sand blocks, sewing and breads. (Data source: PDEM Catacamas, 2007 y Base de Datos del Dpto. Control Tributario Municipalidad de Catacamas 2009).

(1)The construction sector, for example, has been strengthened with new projects of subdivision/development. Many of the houses and land are bought by originating Catacamans living abroad or through their relatives.

(2) Another growth area is tourism. Recently, a public private table implemented activities that strengthen this sector according to a common strategy of the municipalities Santa María del Real and Dulce Nombre de Culmí, supported by the German Cooperation. Currently, we are working on the design of eco-tourism routes and in training for service providers (tour guides, restaurants, hotels, etc.).

(3) Another innovative process is the certification of several coffee farms in the region with the Rainforest Alliance Certificate which is a certificate for sustainable coffee production. The certification can achieve better prices for coffee while preserving the environment. Portal Virtual de Negocios

== Talgua Caves ==
The area's most famous tourist attractions are the Talgua Caves, also known as "The Cave of the Glowing Skulls," is located a couple miles north-east of Catacamas. As a national archaeological site, the Cuevas de Talgua serves as an important source of knowledge about pre-Columbian life and religious practices, while also functioning as a culturally significant space dedicated to respect, education, and historical appreciation.

During the summer of 1995, archaeologists conducted an intensive survey of the Río Talgua drainage in eastern Honduras following the discovery of Talgua Cave in the Department of Olancho.

The caves were used as a burial site by the native peoples, and over time, over time, the piles of human bones on the cave floor became coated with layers of calcium crystals. These crystals reflect light, making the bones appear to glow. Radiocarbon testing indicated that the burials were made around 900 B.C. According to archaeologist Dr. Brady, a specialist in Maya cave archaeology, current evidence does not indicate a close connection between the individuals and the Maya civilization, which dominated much of southern Mexico and northern Central America during the first millennium A.D. However, the burial assemblage included 20 undecorated ceramic bowls and two thin marble vessels whose styles do not correspond to those of known non-Maya cultures from present-day Honduras. Based primarily on the ceramics, Brady suggested the burials likely date somewhere between 300 B.C. and A.D. 500.

== See also ==
- Olancho
