= Jean-Pierre Dellard =

French general

- Born: 8 April 1774; Cahors
- Died: 7 July 1832 (aged 58); Bourg-en-Bresse (Ain)
- Military career
- Branch: Infantry
- Service years: 31 August 1792 – 7 July 1832
- Rank: Brigadier general
- Awards: Baron of the Empire; Officer of the Legion of Honour; Knight of Saint Louis

Jean-Pierre Dellard, born April 8, 1774 in Cahors and died July 7, 1832 in Bourg-en-Bresse (Ain), was a French general of the First Empire.

== Biography ==
He enlisted as a volunteer on 31 August 1792 in an independent company from his department, became a quartermaster shortly afterward, and on the following 1 October was incorporated into the 23rd Reserve Volunteer Battalion, which was merged first into the 163rd Demi-Brigade and later into the 36th Demi-Brigade.

He served in the campaigns of 1792 and 1793 with the armies of Holland and the North, took part in the occupation of Geertruidenberg, and participated in all the engagements fought before Lille.

During a reconnaissance mission toward Lannoy in August 1793, he was the first to charge about one hundred Austrians and forced them to flee. In an engagement on 29 September of the same year, he was wounded in the right leg. On 29 Floréal Year II, he helped capture 400 Austrians and was taken prisoner by the enemy on the following 3 Prairial at the Battle of Templeuve, near Tournai.

Released in Frimaire Year IV, he rejoined his regiment in the Army of Sambre-et-Meuse. Appointed adjutant-major on 1 Messidor of the same year, he received the rank of captain on 1 Messidor Year V, commanded the general conscript depot at Basel, and returned to his unit after incorporating approximately 13,000 young soldiers.

He distinguished himself in the Army of Helvetia in Year VI and Year VII, particularly during the actions of 27 and 28 Thermidor of the latter year at Einsiedeln and the Devil's Bridge. At the head of only a few men, he pursued 2,000 Austrian soldiers to the shores of Lake Zurich, where he forced them to lay down their arms. On the following 10 Fructidor, he took part in the attack on the bridge at Uznach, and the next day, at the head of his battalion's grenadiers, captured the bridge at Nasel.

On the eve of the Second Battle of Zurich, Marshal Soult ordered him to reconnoitre the Linth River below the lake. He carried out the mission with equal intelligence and courage and personally organized a force of 200 swimmers armed with pikes, sabres, and pistols. On the day of the battle, he crossed the river with his men, seized the Austrian redoubts and entrenchments, spiked the enemy guns, spread panic through the Austrian ranks, and killed th commander-in-chief, Friedrich von Hotze, at his headquarters. Before the crossing, he addressed his small force as follows: “You are about to cover yourselves with glory by bringing terror and death into the enemy ranks. You cannot take prisoners; therefore kill everyone you encounter. Advance together and follow my tracks in silence. Victory or death is our watchword. I shall rally you on the right bank with a whistle.”

This exploit earned Dellard the rank of battalion commander on the battlefield and a fine horse presented to him by General Soult. The next day, assisted only by his servant, he captured 80 Austrians and escorted them to headquarters. Because confirmation of his appointment as battalion commander had been delayed, General Moreau, commander-in-chief of the Army of the Danube, again promoted him to that rank on the battlefield on the following 12 Floréal for his conduct during the capture of Fort Hohentwiel. The First Consul confirmed his rank on 29 Vendémiaire Year X, with seniority dating from his original appointment on 4 Vendémiaire Year VIII.

During the crossing of the Rhine, at the head of a battalion from Dominique René Vandamme's division, he launched the first attack against the Austrian cavalry positioned on the plateau before Stockach on 3 May 1800. The following day at Mösskirch, he withstood for more than an hour the fire of a formidable battery placed in the centre of the enemy army. A few days later, he was placed at the head of a detachment consisting of his battalion, cavalry, and light artillery and ordered to screen Vandamme's advance toward the Lech. He then crossed the Danube near Dillingen, marched on Donauwörth, and closely followed the Austrian corps of General Kray. He crossed the Danube again at Donauwörth, advanced toward Neuburg, and from there moved into the Tyrol in the direction of Dornbirn. He helped capture Immenstadt and, with his battalion, established communications between that town and the fortress of Bregenz on Lake Constance.

As soon as he learned of the surrender of Feldkirch and the breakdown of the armistice between General Moreau and the commander of the Austrian army, Dellard joined the corps of General Lacombe, which formed the army's right wing, and seized Oberaudorf, an important position in the Kufstein Valley. Appointed major of the 46th Line Infantry on 20 Brumaire Year XII and a member of the Legion of Honour on the following 11 Germinal, he served in the campaigns of Year XIV and in 1806 at the Camp of Boulogne, where on 10 February 1807 he became colonel of the 16th Light Infantry Regiment. At the head of this regiment, he fought in the campaigns of 1807 and 1808 with the Grande Armée in Prussia and Poland and played a distinguished part in the Battle of Friedland.

After the Peace of Tilsit, the 16th Light Infantry withdrew to Berlin, where it remained in quarters for a year. On 18 August 1808, Colonel Dellard left the camp at Mitrow and travelled with his regiment to the Army of Spain, arriving on 29 October. On the following 11 November, the 16th Light Infantry, acting alone, defeated the left wing of the Spanish army commanded by General Blake. The regiment, numbering 5,000 men and occupying a disadvantageous position, destroyed or dispersed 15,000 Spanish troops holding the heights of Espinosa de los Monteros. Before advancing against the enemy, Colonel Dellard addressed his troops: “Brave 16th, your immortal reputation commands my confidence. Today it is my duty to earn yours; I shall succeed and shall lead you to great deeds if you carry out calmly and silently the movements I order.” Struck by a bullet while leading the assault on the enemy columns, he continued to command. During a review at Burgos on the 22nd of the same month, Napoleon I awarded twelve decorations to the 16th Light Infantry. The distribution took place before the Emperor, who suddenly turned toward Dellard and said: “Then you ask nothing for yourself, Colonel?” Dellard replied: “Sire, my reward lies in that which Your Majesty has just bestowed upon the brave men I command.” The Emperor appointed him an Officer of the Legion of Honour that same day and shortly afterward made him a Baron of the Empire.

He distinguished himself particularly at the Battle of Somosierra and during the capture of Madrid, where a bullet passed through his left arm as he stormed the barracks of the bodyguards. After recovering at the waters of Aachen, he returned to command his regiment at Toledo. He commanded at Arzobispo, from where he observed and reconnoitered the roads to Trujillo and Estella, was the first to report the enemy's march toward Ocaña, and maneuvered with the First Corps to prevent the enemy from crossing the Tagus. He successively occupied several towns and captured Agado. He distinguished himself in the defeat of the insurgents in the Sierra Morena, at the capture of Seville, and at El Puerto de Santa María. King Joseph Bonaparte had a valuable ring presented to him in his name.

He remained at the Siege of Cádiz until July 1810, then transferred with three elite battalions to the command of General Latour-Maubourg, who led a cavalry division at Medina-Sidonia. Ordered to conduct reconnaissance toward Gaucín and San Roque, he was surprised and surrounded on the heights of Jimena by 160 insurgents lying in ambush. With the four voltigeurs accompanying him, he drove them from their position and rejoined his column after thoroughly reconnoitering the enemy position. His many wounds and the hardships of this long and difficult war forced him to return to France in the final months of 1810 to recover his health.

Appointed commander of arms at Ostend on 23 January 1811, he was called by the Emperor in 1812 to take part in the Russian campaign. On 11 November, with 230 infantrymen, he defended against 2,000 cavalrymen and four cannons the considerable supplies he had assembled in the castle of Clementina, and ensured that they were sent to Smolensk. These supplies became the Grande Armée's only resource during its retreat.

After returning to France, he took command of Bayonne. There he received his commission as brigadier general, dated at Dresden on 8 August 1813, together with orders to proceed to Magdeburg. He had barely reached the Rhine when he received service orders appointing him governor of Kastel and senior commander of the forts of Montebello and Saint-Hilaire, as well as the outposts responsible for defending the fortress of Mainz. He retained this command throughout the blockade of the fortress.

Louis XVIII entrusted him with command of the fortress of Valenciennes, and during the Hundred Days he helped preserve the city. Under the Second Bourbon Restoration, the government retained him in that command. In 1818, he was transferred to the command of Cherbourg. He had been appointed Knight of Saint Louis on 11 October 1814.

On 20 August 1823, Louis XVIII gave him command of Besançon. He died on 7 July 1832.

== Service record ==
- 25 March 1804: major in the 49th Line Infantry Regiment
- 10 February 1807: colonel of the 16th Light Infantry Regiment
- 8 August 1813: Brigadier general
- 1815: commander of the fortress of Valenciennes
- 1818: commander of the fortress of Cherbourg
- 20 August 1823: commander of the fortress of Besançon

== Titles, honours, and awards ==
- 25 March 1804: Knight of the Legion of Honour
- 22 November 1808: Officer of the Legion of Honour
- 22 November 1808: Baron of the Empire
- 11 October 1814: Knight of the Order of Saint Louis
