= Clementine (disambiguation) =

A clementine is a hybrid citrus fruit, a cross between a mandarin and a sweet orange.

Clementine may also refer to:

== Arts and entertainment ==
=== Fictional entities ===
- Clementine (given name)
- Clementine, Eddie Riggs' guitar in video game Brütal Legend

=== Film and television ===
- Clementine (2004 film), a South-Korean/American action film
- Clementine (2019 film), an American drama film
- Clémentine, a 1985 French animated TV series
- Clementine (The Walking Dead), a fictional character in The Walking Dead

=== Literature ===
- Clementine (series), a series of children's books by Sara Pennypacker
- Clementine, a 1946 novel by Peggy Goodin
- Clementine, a 1962 novel by Betsy Byars
- Clementine, a 2010 novel by Cherie Priest
- Clementine: The Life of Mrs. Winston Churchill, a 2015 biography by Sonia Purnell
- Clementine, a 1999 young-adult novel by Sophie Masson
- Writings by or ascribed to Pope Clement I (fl. 96), including:
  - Clementine literature

=== Music ===
- "Clementine" (Halsey song), 2019
- "Clementine" (Tom Lehrer song), 1959
- "Clementine" (Mark Owen song), 1997
- "Clementine", a song by Elliott Smith from the 1995 album Elliott Smith
- "Clementine", a song by The Decemberists from the 2002 album Castaways and Cutouts
- "Clementine", a song by Sarah Jaffe from the 2010 album Suburban Nature
- "Clementine", a song by Pink Martini from the 2004 album Hang On Little Tomato
- "Clementine", a song by Johnny Cash from the 1959 album Songs of Our Soil
- "O My Darling, Clementine", Gold Rush-era Western folk ballad

== People ==
- Clementine (given name), a female given name including a list of people and fictional characters with the name
- Clementine (musician) (born 1976), Filipino singer-songwriter and producer
- Clémentine (musician) (born 1963), French singer-songwriter
- AJ Clementine, Australian model, writer, social media influencer, and transgender activist
- Benjamin Clementine (born 1988), English artist, composer and musician

== Science and technology ==
- Clementine (software), an audio player
- Clementine, now SPSS Modeler, a data mining tool
- Clementine (nuclear reactor), at Los Alamos, U.S.
- Clémentine (satellite), a French satellite
- Clementine (spacecraft), an American uncrewed spacecraft
- "Clementine", a recovery craft of Project Azorian

== Other uses ==
- Clementine, Missouri, place in the U.S.
- Clementine Maersk, a 2002 container ship

== See also ==
- Clementine literature, a third-century Christian romance containing a fictitious account of the conversion of Clement of Rome to Christianity
- Clement (disambiguation)
- My Darling Clementine (disambiguation)
