= Diocese of Juticalpa =

Diocese of the Catholic Church in Honduras

Coordinates: 14.6710°N 86.2184°W

Diocese of Juticalpa Dioecesis Iuticalpensis
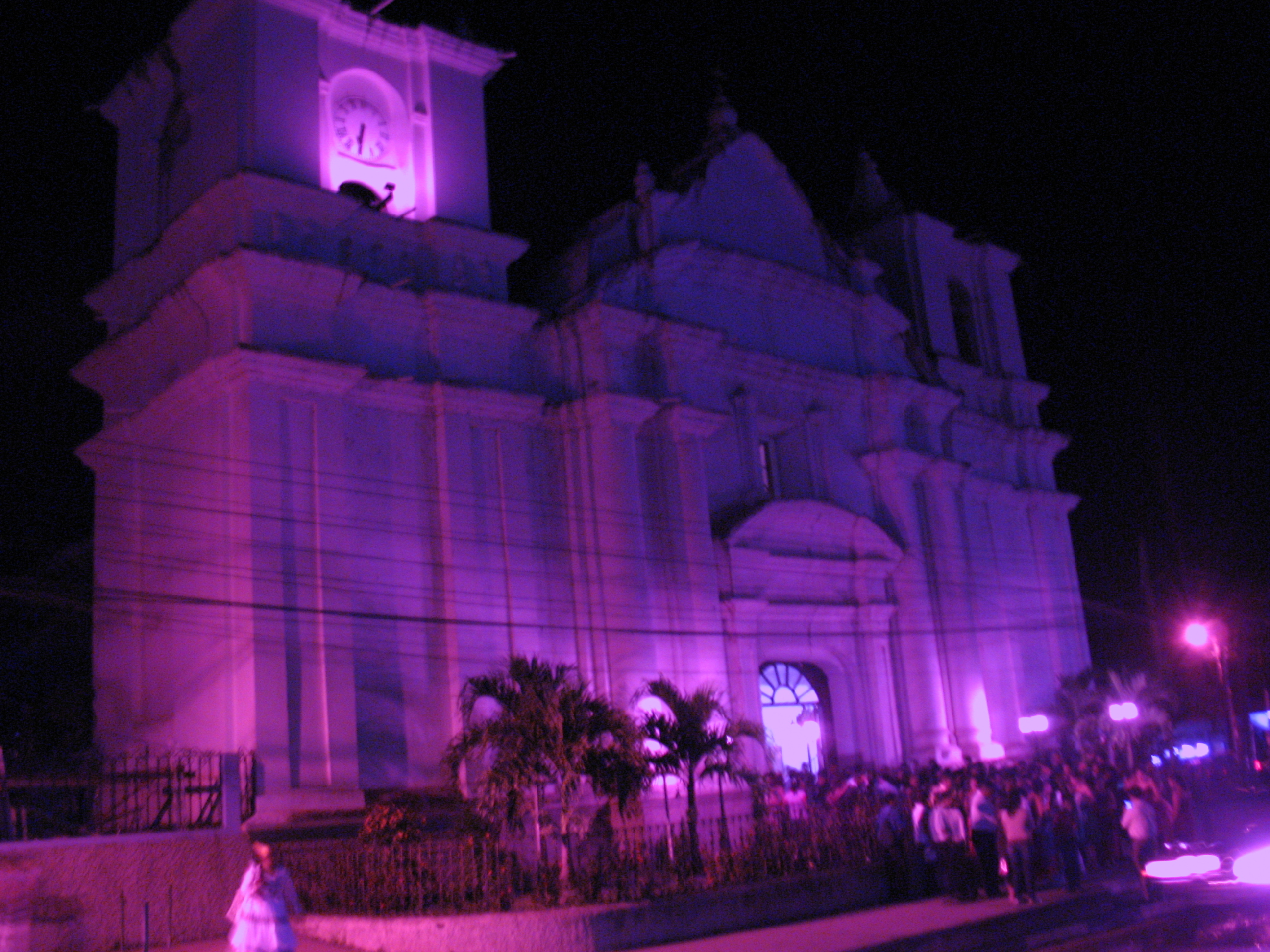
- Catedral de la Inmaculada Concepción

Location
- Country: Honduras
- Ecclesiastical province: Province of Tegucigalpa
- Metropolitan: Oscar Andrés Rodríguez Maradiaga, S.D.B.

Statistics
- Area: 24,351 km^{2} (9,402 sq mi)
- Population: Total; Catholics: (as of 2006); 546,129; 491,201 (89.9%)
- Parishes: 13

Information
- Denomination: Roman Catholic
- Rite: Roman Rite
- Established: 6 March 1949 (76 years ago)
- Cathedral: Cathedral of the Immaculate Conception

Current leadership
- Pope: Leo XIV
- Bishop: José Bonello, O.F.M.
- Bishops emeritus: Tomás Andrés Mauro Muldoon, O.F.M.

Map

The Roman Catholic Diocese of Juticalpa (erected 6 March 1949, as the Territorial Prelature of Inmaculada Concepción de la B.V.M. en Olancho) is a suffragan of the Archdiocese of Tegucigalpa. It was elevated as the Diocese of Juticalpa on 31 October 1987.

== Bishops ==
=== Ordinaries ===
- Bernardino N. Mazzarella, O.F.M. (1954–1963)
- Nicholas D'Antonio Salza, O.F.M. (1963–1977)
- Tomás Andrés Mauro Muldoon, O.F.M. (1983–2012)
- José Bonello, O.F.M. (2012–)

=== Coadjutor bishop ===
- José Bonello, O.F.M. (2010-2012)

== See also ==
- Catholic Church in Honduras
- Immaculate Conception Cathedral, Juticalpa
