= Mary Jane Auch =

American writer

- Born: Mineola, New York, US
- Education: Skidmore College; Columbia University
- Occupations: Author, illustrator
- Spouse: Herm Auch (m. 1967)
- Children: 2
- Writing career
- Genre: Children's literature

Mary Jane Auch is an American author and illustrator of children's books.

Auch was born in Mineola, New York, and was a single child. She has a Bachelor of Arts in arts from Skidmore College, as well as a degree in occupational therapy from Columbia University. In 1967, she married graphic artist and cartoonist Herm Auch, with whom she eventually had two children. The family lived on their farm near Rochester, New York.

Auch published her first novel, The Witching of Ben Wagner, with Houghton Mifflin in 1987, and her first picture book, The Easter Egg Farm, with Holiday House in 1992. She has since published many additional novels and picture books, including One Plus One Equals Blue, Ashes of Roses, The Road to Home, Journey to Nowhere, and the I was a Third Grade ... series of books for younger readers. The Princess and the Pizza, a collaboration with her husband, was an International Reading Association Children's Choice in 2003 and won the 2003 Storytelling World Award, as well as being nominated for the Young Hoosier Picture Book Award and the Show Me Readers Award.

== Publications ==
=== Picture books ===
- The Easter Egg Farm, Holiday House (New York, NY), 1992.
- Bird Dogs Can't Fly, Holiday House (New York, NY),1993.
- Peeping Beauty, Holiday House (New York, NY), 1993.
- Monster Brother, Holiday House (New York, NY), 1994.
- Hen Lake, Holiday House (New York, NY), 1995.
- Eggs Mark the Spot, Holiday House (New York, NY), 1996.
- Bantam of the Opera, Holiday House (New York, NY),1997.
- Noah's Aardvark, Golden Books (New York, NY), 1999.
- The Nutquacker, Holiday House (New York, NY), 1999.
- The Princess and the Pizza (with Herm Auch), Holiday House (New York, NY), 2002.
- Poultrygeist (with Herm Auch), Holiday House (New York, NY), 2003.
- Souperchicken (with Herm Auch), Holiday House (New York, NY), 2003.
- Chickerella (with Herm Auch), Holiday House (New York, NY), 2005.
- Beauty and the Beaks (with Herm Auch), Holiday House (New York, NY), 2007.
- The Buk Buk Festival (with Herm Auch), Holiday House (New York, NY), 2015.

=== Novels ===
- The Witching of Ben Wagner, Houghton Mifflin (Boston, MA), 1987.
- Cry Uncle!, Holiday House (New York, NY), 1987.
- Mom Is Dating Weird Wayne, Holiday House (New York,NY), 1988.
- Pick of the Litter, Holiday House (New York, NY), 1988.
- Glass Slippers Give You Blisters, Holiday House (New York, NY), 1989.
- Angel and Me and the Bayside Brothers, illustrated by Cat Bowman Smith, Little, Brown (Boston, MA), 1989.
- Kidnapping Kevin Kowalski, Holiday House (New York, NY), 1990.
- A Sudden Change of Family, Holiday House (New York, NY), 1990.
- Seven Long Years until College, Holiday House (New York, NY), 1991.
- Out of Step, Holiday House (New York, NY), 1992.
- The Latchkey Dog, illustrated by Cat Bowman Smith, Little, Brown (Boston, MA), 1994.
- Journey to Nowhere, Holt (New York, NY), 1997.
- I Was a Third-Grade Science Project, illustrated by Herm Auch, Holiday House (New York, NY), 1998.
- Frozen Summer (sequel to Journey to Nowhere), Holt (New York, NY), 1998.
- The Road Home (sequel to Frozen Summer), Holt (New York, NY), 2000.
- Ashes of Roses, Holt (New York, NY), 2001.
- I Was a Third-Grade Spy, illustrated by Herm Auch, Holiday House (New York, NY), 2001.
- I Was a Third-Grade Bodyguard, illustrated by Herm Auch, Holiday House (New York, NY), 2003.
- Wing Nut, Holt (New York, NY), 2005.
- One-Handed Catch, Holt (New York, NY), 2006.
- A Dog on His Own, Holiday House (New York, NY), 2008.

=== As illustrator ===
- Dumbstruck (written by Sara Pennypacker), Holiday House (New York, NY), 1994.
- Troll Teacher (written by Vivian Vande Velde), Holiday House (New York, NY), 2000.
