= Clementina Robertson =

Irish painter

- Born: 1795; Dublin
- Died: 1853 (aged 57–58) ? Dublin
- Known for: miniature-painting

Clementina Robertson (1795 – 1853?) was an Irish miniature-painter.

== Life ==
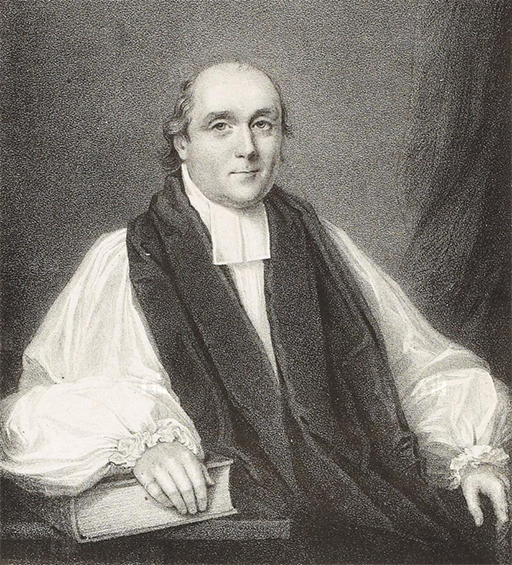
Power Le Poer Trench by Clementina Robertson

Clementina Robertson was born in 1795 in Dublin. Her father was the miniature-painter, Charles Robertson, and she was trained by him. Her uncle was another miniature-painter, Walter Robertson. As a competent artist, she painted in the style of her father, and exhibited with the Society of Artists from 1812 to 1817. In 1830 she married John Siree, a medical student. He died of a fever in 1835. She was able to support herself through her miniature-portrait painting, further supplementing her finances by teaching languages, music, and drawing.

In 1826 she exhibited five portraits with the Royal Hibernian Academy, and a further three in 1828. At this time her address was listed as Summerhill, Dublin. In 1831 she exhibited a "portrait of a young lady" as Mrs Siree, and she was living at 10 Russell St. The National Gallery of Ireland hold a portrait by her of her husband. Her last known address is at 3 Westland Row in 1853, and it is thought she died soon after.
