= Charles Robertson (Irish artist) =

Irish painter

- Born: circa 1760; Dublin
- Died: 10 November 1821 (aged 60–61); Dublin
- Known for: miniature-painting

Charles Robertson (c. 1760 – 1821) was an Irish miniature-painter.

== Life ==
Charles Robertson was born in Dublin around 1760. The Robertsons were a family of miniaturists and jewellers who lived on Ormond Quay. He was possibly related to Alexander Robertson who died in July 1768 in Ormond Quay. He lived with his older brother Walter, who was also a miniaturist, at his studio on Essex Street, Dublin and potentially trained with him also. From 1769, at age 9, to 1774 Robertson exhibited "designs in hair" at the Society of Artists on William Street, moving on to miniatures from 1775.

From 1775, Robertson had his own studio at 69 South Great Georges Street. He was living in 11 Claredon Street in 1783. He lived in London from 1785 to 1792 where he continued to paint miniatures and from 1790 to 1810 he exhibited with the Royal Academy. He visited London briefly again in 1806, but returned to settle in Dublin, living at 7 Holles Street. He exhibited miniatures and "flower pieces" from 1800 to 1802 and 1811 to 1821. In 1814, he became the secretary and later vice-president of the Hibernian Society of Artists, and also served on the committee looking to found an Irish Academy of Painting. Robertson never signed his works, but they are generally identifiable by his use of pale grey-blue skin tones.

The National Gallery of Ireland (NGI) hold a number of works by Robertson including portrait of a woman wearing a white dress. Henry Brooke Kirchhoffer painted a portrait of Robertson depicting him at his miniature-painting desk. The NGI hold this portrait and Robertson's desk. Other examples of his work are held in the V&A and The Met.

Robertson married Christina Noletar Jaffrey. The couple had several children, including the miniaturist Clementina. He died at his home on Holles Street on 10 November 1821.
