= My Darling Clementine (disambiguation) =

My Darling Clementine is a 1946 American Western film

My Darling Clementine may also refer to:

- "Oh My Darling, Clementine", a traditional American folk ballad
- O, My Darling Clementine, a 1943 American musical film
- My Darling Clementine (1953 film), a Mexican comedy film
- My Darling Clementine (duo), an English country music duo

== See also ==
- Darling Clementine, performer in the television show Rad Girls
- Clementine (disambiguation)
