= William Butler (missionary) =

Rev. William Butler D. D.
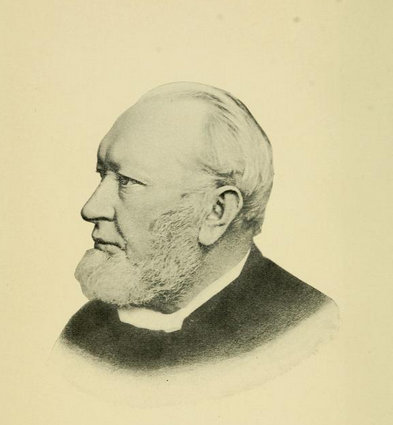

Personal life
- Born: January 30, 1818 Dublin, Ireland
- Died: August 18, 1899 (aged 81) Old Orchard, Maine, U.S.
- Spouse: Clementina Rowe Butler (m. 1854)
- Children: 4, including Clementina Butler (daughter), Dr. John Wesley Butler (son)

Religious life
- Religion: Methodist Episcopal Church
- Founder of: Methodist Episcopal Mission in India; Methodist Episcopal Mission in Mexico
- Profession: missionary
- Ordination: 1848

Rev. William Butler, D.D. (January 30, 1818 – August 18, 1899) was an Irish-born U.S. Methodist Episcopal pioneer missionary. He was the founder of the Methodist Episcopal Mission in India, and afterward founder of the Mission in Mexico.

Born in Ireland in 1818, he was converted to the Methodist movement in 1837, and in 1839, he began to preach. Ordained in 1848, he came to the U.S. in 1850, and for several years, preached in Massachusetts. From 1856 to 1866, he was in India, before returning to Massachusetts. From 1873 to 1879, he was in Mexico. He subsequently wrote books on missions in India and Mexico, which were used as standard works in his time. As a preacher Butler was evangelical, evangelistic, and eloquent. He was rugged and aggressive, but he would not indulge, nor permit his preachers to indulge, in controversy. His was a positive message.

== Early life and education ==
William Butler was born in Dublin, Ireland, January 30, 1818. Orphaned early in life, he was for some years in the care of a great-grandmother, who used to induce the boy to mount a chair for a pulpit, and, clad in an improvised surplice, to read the lessons for the day from the Church of England prayer book. This service was a great comfort to the old woman, who was unable any longer to attend church.

Until the age of 20, he was connected with the Established Church of Ireland. His conversion and his connection with the Methodist movement were brought about by a woman, who herself had come into a conscious religious experience under the influence of the Methodists. This stranger asked Butler, "Do you pray?". The thoughtfulness induced by this question led to his conversion, and dedication to the Christian ministry, along with being impressed deeply by a sermon preached in Dublin by Dr. John Price Durbin.

== Career ==
=== Ireland ===
His first sermon was preached in St John's Market, Liverpool, in 1839. He joined the Irish Methodist Conference in 1844. After three years of theological study, he joined the Irish Wesleyan Conference and was ordained in 1848. Since his first ministerial efforts, Butler read the Christian Advocate and such books on American Methodism as he was able to secure. Early in 1850, he resolved to remove to the U.S. and to identify himself with the Methodist Episcopal Church.

=== Massachusetts ===
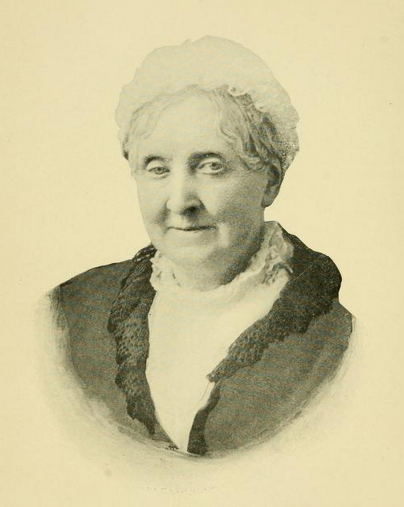
Clementina Rowe Butler

Soon after graduating from Didsbury Theological Seminary in England he came to the U.S. Arriving in New York City, he was received into the New York East Conference and was immediately transferred to the New England Conference and stationed at Williamsburg, Massachusetts. Butler now began his missionary propaganda. During his pastorates, he devoted much of his study to the condition of the underprivileged world, preaching missionary sermons, and publishing articles on the subject in the church periodicals. He gave to the church at large an immense amount of missionary information and aroused the Methodist Church to missionary enthusiasm as it never before had encountered.

In 1852, he was stationed at Shelburne Falls, Massachusetts and published a Compendium of Missions which, for many years, was a standard authority on its subject. In 1853, he was at Westfield, Massachusetts. In 1854 and 1855, he was at Common Street, Lynn, Massachusetts.

He married Clementina Rowe in Portland, Maine, November 23, 1854. (Note: According to the Boston Globe (13 Sep 1913), the wedding occurred November 23, 1855.)

=== Foreign missions ===
The land of the Veda

From Boston to Bareilly and back

Mexico in transition

After a few years, the project of a mission in India was taken up by the missionary Board of the Methodist Episcopal Church, and appeals were issued to the ministry for someone to offer himself to go and begin the work. But for more than three years, no one fitted for the position was found. Butler shared the anxiety of the secretaries and bishops lest the enterprise should fail for want of a suitable leader. On account of his four young children, he hesitated to offer himself. But finally, his sense of the great need of the people of India led him to consult with the authorities, and in November 1855, he was appointed by Bishop Matthew Simpson as superintendent of the new mission. His wife seconded him in his determination. Leaving two boys at school in the U.S., the family sailed from the U.S. in April 1856.

On their way, they stopped in London to confer with the secretaries of the different missionary societies as to the most desirable field for the Methodist Church to enter where no other agency was at work. They sailed from Southampton, England, August 20, arriving in Calcutta on September 23, 1856.

Upon arrival in Calcutta, the same inquiries were made as to the most needy provinces; and Oudh and Rohilcund, in the Gangetic valley, with their twenty millions inhabitants, were selected as the field of the new mission. The people were intensely hostile to Christianity; and the feeling of unrest in the army culminated in the atrocities of the Sepoy Rebellion, only ten weeks after the Butlers began their work in Bareilly. They were compelled to flee to the mountains, where at Naini Tal, they found a refuge for several months. Their nearest missionary neighbors, of the Presbyterian mission, on the other side of the Ganges, who had fled from Futtyghur for safety, were massacred, Butler's home was burned, and a gallows erected for him in the public square at Bareilly, the rebel leader there expressing his great disappointment when he found that the missionary had escaped. The first Eurasian assistant, a young woman, was killed; and the native preacher, Joel, who, with his wife, had been spared by the Presbyterian missionaries to aid in beginning the mission, escaped.

The Methodist church in the U.S. believed that Dr. and Mrs. Butler had died, as no messages of their safety could reach the outside world; and an obituary was published, so certain did it seem that they had perished. Dr. Butler's first and only experience in handling firearms was at this time, when he and 86 Englishmen held the pass up to their place of refuge against the 3,000 Sepoys who were sent to capture them. The history of this time was graphically recounted by Dr. Butler in his Land of the Veda.

As soon as peace was restored, the work was begun again. He was reinforced by missionaries from the U.S., and in 1864, the Mission was organized into an Annual Conference. Butler's plan for the missions was to avoid controversy. The Woman's Foreign Missionary Society of the Methodist Episcopal Church came to aid this work. The principal towns of the two provinces were supplied with foreign missionaries, and from these centres, the work was pushed out into the villages round about.

The health of Butler made it necessary for him to leave India. He left for the U.S. in January, 1865 aboard a sailing-vessel around the Cape of Good Hope during the closing days of the American Civil War.

In 1866 and 1867, he was at Walnut Street, Chelsea, and in 1868 at Dorchester Street, South Boston.

In 1870, he was appointed secretary of the American and Foreign Christian Union, which had as its especial object evangelical work in the Republic of Mexico, just then opening to Protestant influences. Within a couple of years, some of the churches began to feel that more could be done through separate missions of each denomination.

In 1872, Butler was appointed superintendent of a Mission to be founded in Mexico. He arrived in Mexico in February, 1873. Entering the republic soon after the troublous times which ended the so-called Empire of Maximilian of Austria, he found religious liberty in the constitution of the land, though it was as yet imperfectly understood by the masses. Threats of violence were frequently made by the fanatical part of the population, and many times, the missionaries' lives were imperilled; but the law upheld the right of religious liberty, and only one foreigner lost his life, though many Mexicans suffered bitter persecution and death.

In six years, the mission was firmly established in numbers and influence. Butler returned to the U.S. in poor health, but soon recovered sufficiently to go throughout the Methodist Church, urging the claims of the missionary work with eloquence and enthusiasm, thus greatly aiding the missionary secretaries in bringing up the financial contributions of the churches. During this time, he served one term at Melrose, Massachusetts.

Dr. and Mrs. Butler revisited India in 1883 and 1884 to review the progress of the work. After an extended tour through the various missions, they gave the following three years to the Missionary Society in the successful effort to raise the missionary offering of the church to US$1,000,000 a year. After his visit in 1884, he wrote, From Boston to Bareilly and Back.

He also revisited Mexico, where he found the work equally full of promise, even if not yet realizing the results of years of labor as fully as the older and larger mission of India. There among the workers was his son, one of the boys who had been so left behind when Butler first went to India, now devoting his life to Methodism in Mexico. In the volume, Mexico in Transition, written after this visit, Butler traced Christianity within the history of Mexico.

== Retirement ==
His latter life was spent in Newton Centre, Massachusetts. Though in very feeble health, and despite physical pain and weariness, his latter days were peaceful. He enjoyed reading weekly field reports. He also continued to write pleadings for the missions of the church, one of his latest effort being to secure chapels in some villages in India.

== Death and legacy ==
Butler died at Old Orchard, Maine, August 18, 1899. He was survived by his wife, two sons, and two daughters. President Porfirio Díaz, of Mexico, was one of the first to send a letter of sympathy to Butler's son, Dr. John W. Butler, who carried on the work started by his father.

Butler's life insurance, only US$1,000, was divided equally between India and Mexico.

A biography, William Butler : the founder of two missions of the Methodist Episcopal Church, was published in 1902 by his daughter, Miss Clementina Butler.

== Selected works ==
- Compendium of Missions, 1852
- The Land of the Veda, 1871
- From Boston to Bareilly and back, 1885
- Mexico in transition from the power of political romanism to civil and religious liberty, 1893

== See also ==
William Taylor—Methodist Missionary in India following Butler
