= Clementina Rowe Butler =

Irish-born American Christian missionary

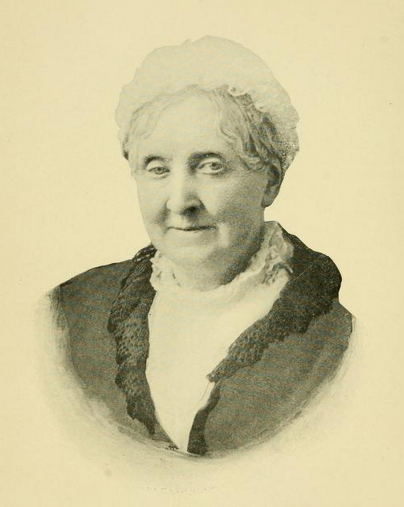
Clementina Rowe Butler

Clementina Rowe Butler (née, Rowe; also known as Mother of Missions, Mother Butler, and Mrs. William Butler; 30 July 1820 – 12 September 1913) was an Irish-born American Christian missionary. She co-founded the Woman's Foreign Missionary Society of the Methodist Episcopal Church. At the time of her death, she was reputed to be the oldest missionary in the world.

== Biography ==
Clementina Rowe was born in Wexford, Ireland, on 30 July 1820. Her parents were English. When but a child past ten years of age, she became immensely interested in missionary work, being made a collector in the Sunday school, which she attended, for the missionaries, and always looked back with considerable interest to the $60 which she collected the first year.

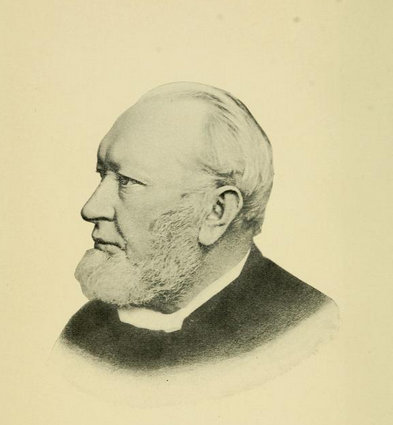
William Butler

She married Dr. William Butler in Portland, Maine, on 23 November 1854. (Note: According to the Boston Globe (13 Sep 1913), the wedding occurred on 23 November 1855.) He was an Irish-born American Methodist Episcopal Church pioneer missionary. Later, the couple removed to Lynn, Massachusetts. At this time, Alexander Duff came to the U.S. and pleaded with the Methodists to establish a mission in India. The sum of $7000 was pledged and Mr. and Mrs. Butler were chosen to establish the mission in an untouched part of India. The couple sailed on 8 April 1856, being the pioneer missionaries of the Methodist Episcopal Church in India.

The two pioneer missionaries established their home in the city of Bareilly, British India just ten weeks before the breaking out of the Sepoy Rebellion of 1857. Also popularly known as the revolt of 1857. Traveling day and night, through forests and jungles. The Butlers finally reached a place of safety in the heart of the Himalayas. Their hiding place was discovered, however, and they fled from place to place, until with the fall of Lucknow, the mutiny/revolt was finally ended. Mrs. Butler was the only American woman who witnessed the revolt of 1857. After the country had quieted down, Mr. and Mrs. Butler again took up their missionary work, and continued for eight years.

Ill-health compelled Mr. Butler to leave India in 1865, and returning to the U.S., he held pastorates in New England until 1873. In that year, Mr. and Mrs. Butler were sent to Mexico to found Methodist missions in that country. After the couple left Mexico, their son, Rev. John Butler, took charge, and spent more than four decades in Mexico as a Methodist missionary.

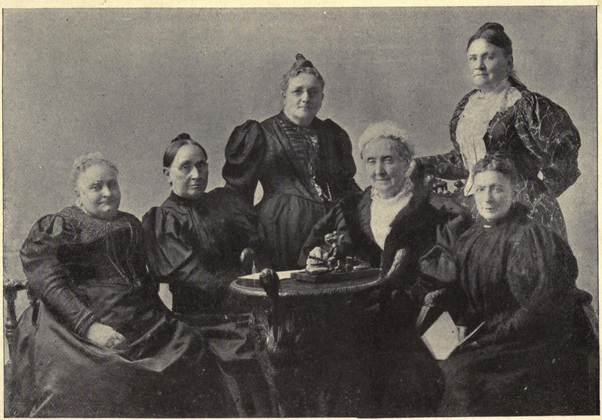
Founders of the Woman's Foreign Missionary Society. Mrs. Thomas Rich. Mrs. E. W. Parker. Mrs. Thomas Kingsbury. Mrs. William Merrill. Mrs. William Butler. Mrs. Lewis Flanders.

Butler was one of seven women to found the Woman's Foreign Missionary Society of the Methodist Episcopal Church. She spoke in Carnegie Hall during the Jubilee held in New York City.

The couple returned to the scene of their labors in India in 1883, and ten years later, Butler Hall, a building for the use of the theological seminary at Bareilly, was dedicated, and when Mrs. Butler last visited India, accompanied by her daughter, Miss Clementina Butler, she was present at the exercised attending the laying of the cornerstone of the Mrs. William Butler Memorial Hospital at Baroda.

== Death and legacy ==
Butler died at her home in Newton Centre, Massachusetts, on 12 September 1913. With her at the time of her death were her two daughter, Miss Clementina Butler, with whom she made her home, and Mrs. William H. Thurber of Providence, Rhode Island. The funeral services were held in her home church, which has a memorial window to Dr. William Butler, representing the Great Commission.

In 1929, Butler's daughter, Clementina, published a biography, Mrs. William Butler: Two Empires and the Kingdom.
