= Talgua Caves =

Cave in Honduras

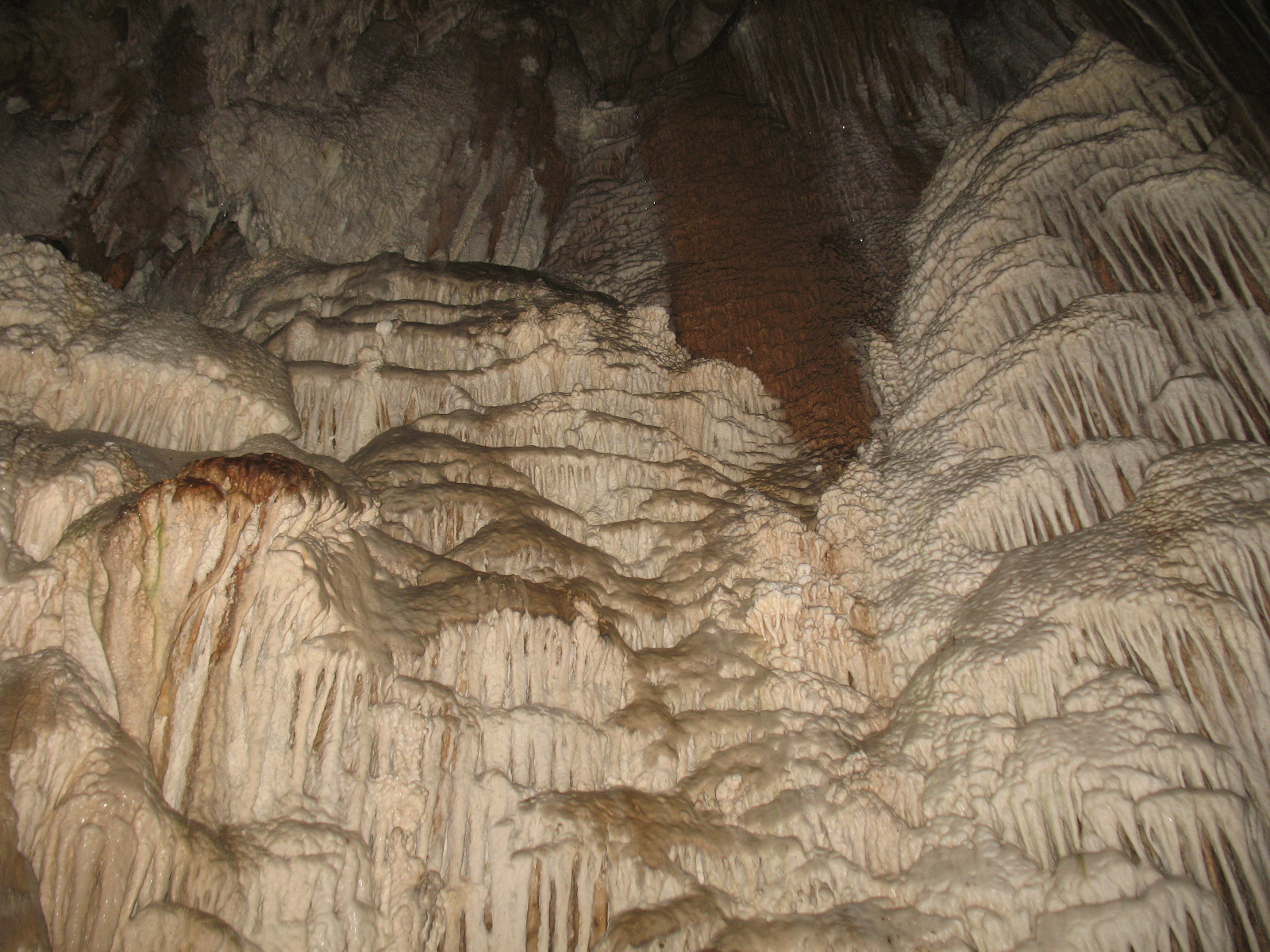
Cave

Talgua Cave ("Cave of the Glowing Skulls"; “Cueva del Rio Talgua”) is a cave located in the Olancho Valley in the municipality of Catacamas in northeastern Honduras. The misnomer “The Cave of the Glowing Skulls” was given to the cave because of the way that light reflects off of the calcite deposits found on the skeletal remains found there. The site has gained the interest of archaeologists studying cave burials of Central America and of Mesoamerica as one of the most extensive Early to Middle Pre-Classic (~1000-900 BC in this case) ossuary cave sites currently known to have been in contact with the Maya societies of nearby Mesoamerica. It provides many valuable clues to how the inhabitants of the Talgua Cave may have been an important link between Pre-Columbian Mesoamerica and parts further south and east in Central America and extending into those societies in northern South America, a region known as the Isthmo-Colombian Area.

== Modern discovery ==
For generations, residents of the nearby areas had known of and visited the cave. The ossuary chamber, however, remained undiscovered until April 1994. Two United States Peace Corps volunteers, Greg Cabe and Tim Berg and three Hondurans, Jorge Yáñez and Desiderio Reyes, and Mariano Rodriguez were exploring the cave on the east bank of the Talgua River, about six kilometres from the city of Catacamas, when they first saw human skeletal remains about 600 metres inside the cave. Berg and Cabe reported their find to Honduran and American archaeologists. After the initial discovery of the remains, James Brady, professor of anthropology at California State University, Los Angeles and George Hasemann, head of the archaeology section of Honduran Institute of Anthropology and History (IHAH) in Tegucigalpa began investigating the historical implications of the site related to the inhabitants of this region and ancient northeastern Honduras cave burials. The IHAH supervised and authorized all archaeological exploration and protection of the cave.

== Archaeological investigations ==
Traditionally, the majority of the archaeological focus in Honduras has been in the Maya ruins of Copán, the pinnacle of which is normally associated with the Maya Classic period (~200-900 CE). The recent discovery of the Talgua funerary site has been dated using radiocarbon dating to the Early to Middle Pre-Classic period (~1000 BCE). This type of burial site is normally seen as corresponding to some advancing form of social complexity, which greatly increases the site’s appeal to those interested in the study of societal development in Pre-Columbian Central and Mesoamerica and those societies interacting with the Maya.

During the initial investigation following the discovery of the main ossuary chamber within the cave, another tunnel containing three passageways was found. Within the primary ossuary chamber and the three additional passageways, 23 deposits containing human skeletal remains were discovered, at least 20 of which contained the remains of more than one person. All remains were described as appearing to be secondary burials that were moved from their initial burial sites. The bones were most likely packaged in cloth material and carried into the cave through an old entrance no longer available. Further analysis indicated that the flesh had been removed and the bones were placed in small bundles before arrival to the cave. All of the bones were painted with a red pigment (determined through x-ray diffraction to be red ocher with numerous iron oxides and including hematite). The pigment was also splattered on the ground and walls surrounding the cave, which appears to be due to its rapid and liberal application. All skeletal remains were preserved in and cemented to the ground by calcite.

The water level within the cave made the remains found to be in two different contexts. Natural deterioration due to dripping and damage from vandalism had affected greatly those burials found on ledges and above the water level. However, all of the offerings found in the cave are associated with the burials found above the water line. Burials below the water line were found to be within relatively deep (~ 1 metre) rimstone dams.

In addition to the human skeletal remains, there were at least 20 intact and restorable ceramic vessels found in the cave. At least one of the vessels was “ceremonially killed” by having had a hole punched in the bottom of it. Many of the vessels were positioned in a manner resembling several cave burials at the site of Copán. The investigators of the site, however, have found evidence in further social stratification in the relationships of the vessels to the human remains.

== Identity of site's occupants ==
Determining the identity and languages of the people whose remains are located in the Talgua Cave has been a complicated and difficult endeavor because Rio Talgua, described during the period following the Spanish Conquest, fell on the border of a number of ethnic groups. A Spanish missionary named Father Fernando Espino described the Olancho Valley to be an area containing “more than two-hundred different nations and languages” in 1674. Although there are numerous links between the people of Talgua and the Maya cultures, the site is definitively and categorically not a Mayan site due to location and spoken language.

Two of the most likely candidates for the lineage of the people at Talgua are the Lenca people and the Pech People (Paya). The Lenca people are generally considered to be Mesoamerican and are now spread among the following western Honduran Municipalities: La Paz Department, Comayagua Department, Intibucá Department, Lempira Department and Santa Bárbara Department. Although, evidence of Pre-Columbian Lencan culture can be traced to the Olancho Valley (Salinas). Pech people, who speak a variation of the Chibchan languages of South America, can still be found in the Olancho Department in the area surrounding the site and along the Rio Talgua, as well as in the Colón Department. Other candidates for descendants include the Tawahka and the Tol people

Despite the difficulty of determining for certain the exact identity of the inhabitants of Talgua, many aspects of their society can be determined with some certainty. Based on finds at the Talgua Cave and at the Talgua Village Site, a definite affiliation with Mesoamerica and the Maya living in the area of Copán has been determined. The people at Talgua were linked in trade with the Maya and, reflected in many of the objects and architecture of the Talgua area, had many similarities to the Maya of the period. In the words of one of the principal investigators of the site, James E. Brady: "To put the Talgua site into Maya perspective, the Talgua people may have been interacting with the Maya and had developed a level of civilization equal to any society known in the Maya area at that time."

A surprising find relating to analysis of the bone protein stable isotopes is that the people buried in the cave did not eat an abundance of maize, the cultivation of which is normally seen as corresponding to advancements in social complexity and stratification within Pre-Columbian societies of Mesoamerica and surrounding areas. Instead, researchers suspect that manioc, or cassava root may have been the society’s primary means of subsistence.

== Talgua village site ==
Along an ancient terrace on the west bank of the Rio Talgua, within a kilometre of the cave entrance, a settlement has been unearthed that has since been determined to be the largest site in the country of Honduras from the period. The site extends for over a third of a mile and contains at least 100 standing structures. Many aspects of the settlement (i.e., size, shape, distribution, central plazas, etc.) resemble those of many sites in southeastern Mesoamerica.

Ceramics collected at the settlement were similar to those found at the ossuary, which links the settlement area to the ossuary as the probable area of primary habitation for those people found buried in the Talgua Cave. Ceramics from other sites in Honduras were of very little help in determining the chronology of the Talgua site because the northeast region of Honduras developed independently of other regions throughout the majority of its prehistory.

== Trade networks ==
Architectural patterns and objects found at the Talgua settlement provide indicators of both social stratification and trade networks with the Maya. Jade and marble vessels found at the site are seen as items of prestige and clues to the degree of social stratification. In addition to the prestige items found, there were numerous items made of obsidian, which would have come from the Maya highland regions and jade from Maya areas of Guatemala. Whereas, items found to be made out of green, jade-like rocks indigenous to northeast Honduras were found not to be Jade at all, but jadeites or green rocks with a distinct talc feel (Cuddy 122). In further exemplification of the role of this area as an important buffer zone between Mesoamerica and southern Central and South America, Doris Stone (1966) has pointed out that much of the area’s later fascination with gold came from the south and fascination with jade came from the Maya in the north. Items and beads of greenstone were in full production by around 500 CE.

The Cuyamel ceramics found in northeastern Honduras are contemporaneous with the Olmec rise in the Middle Pre-classic period. It has not been definitively determined that Olmec art and culture would have spread to northeastern Honduras during this time period. However, the ceramics are thought to have stylistic similarities to other Pre-Classic Mesoamerican ceramics and the presence of Olmec imagery is documented at Early Pre-Classic villages in northeastern, coastal Honduras, such as Puerto Escondido.

Although not much can be said definitively about trade with Maya during the Early to Middle Pre-Classic, other than that it occurred, there are other, better-documented cases of Maya trade with northeastern Honduras during later periods. For example, the site of Naco was involved in steady trade with Maya areas of the Yucatán and may have been an intermediary trade location between the Maya and other cultures of Central America just prior to arrival of the Spaniards.

== Visiting the Cave ==
A small piece of the Talgua Cave can be toured by the public. Travel to Catacamas, Olancho and continue on toward the caves, there are high quality roads and bridges that allow access to the cave. A well developed and secure walking trail has been constructed of cement and iron from the road up to the cave entrance. In 1995 access included an oxcart trail followed by arduous trekking through the jungle, and fording the Talgua River. The park entrance charges a nominal fee of approximately $1(US) to Hondurans, and $20(US) to foreigners. A guide is required for tours of the cave for a negotiable fee.

THE MODERN CAVE: Your guide will instruct you to remain on the system of narrow elevated walkways that exist throughout the cave, and to be careful not to touch the delicate walls. Visitors barely set foot on the cave floor. The vast majority of the cave, including the ossuary, is off limits to public access. Public access is limited to about 500 meters, readers will note that discoverer accounts show that the ossuary is located about 1,000 meters within the cave. Nothing can be seen of significance within the cave, all cave formations including all but a few stalagmites high up in the ceiling were destroyed and removed by locals long before the discovery of the ossuary. Few caves show the level of destruction that exists in this cave, and it is doubtful that anyone not using powered machinery could do any noticeable further degradation to the accessible portion of the cave. At the furthest allowed penetration into the cave you will arrive at a heavy barred doorway placed to protect against entry after the cave was thoroughly looted in 1994-1995. Nothing can be seen at this point, and your guide will tell you that this is the entry to the ossuary that lies just beyond. The true ossuary entrance lies some hundreds of yards - roughly double the distance into the cave that visitors are allowed to enter- beyond the barred door. The cave itself continues well beyond for roughly a mile into the mountain with several branches. About 2,000 feet beyond the barred door destruction of the cave interior dramatically decreases and a beautiful natural cave can be seen. Deep within the cave hundreds of crawl holes, many of which are impassable in wet season, were possible to explore in the days before The Door.
