= Clementina =

Clementina may refer to:

== Literature ==
- Clementine literature, or Clementina, a 2nd-century religious romance
- Clementina (play), a 1771 tragedy by Hugh Kelly
- Clementina (novel), a 1901 novel by A. E. W. Mason
- Clementina (character), a fictional character in the Jeeves series

== Other uses ==
- Clementina (computer), an early scientific computer
- Clementina (given name), including a list of people with the name
- Clementina (zarzuela), a 1786 Spanish zarzuela by Luigi Boccherini
- Clementina, São Paulo, Brazil
- 252 Clementina, a main belt asteroid

== See also ==
- Clementine (disambiguation)
