= Clementine Lynch =

Abbess in Ypres Benedictine convent

Mother Clementine Lynch OSB
- Born: 16 June 1754; Ireland
- Died: 22 June 1799 (aged 45); Ypres
- Other name: Mary Scholastica

Clementine Lynch, OSB (in religion, Mary Scholastica; 16 June 1754– 22 June 1799), was an Irish Catholic nun who served as abbess of the Benedictine convent in Ypres, Belgium, during the French Revolution.

== Biography ==
Lynch was born 16 June 1754 in Ireland and was sent to the Benedictine school in Ypres, then part of the Austrian Netherlands, 9 July 1764. When she had completed her school years she remained in the order, becoming first a postulant on 29 September 1770 and completing her vows on 21 March 1772. She took the name Mary Scholastica. Lynch became the fifth Abbess on 17 October 1783 when she was elected to the position.

The convent and surrounding area was invaded by the French in 1793, continuing from the French Revolution of 1789. However because the convent had close ties to its Irish origin and the women were known as ‘the Irish dames of Ypres’, an Irish general, appealed to by Lynch, persuaded the troops to withdraw from the convent and even to pay for damages. The general, believed to be James O'Moran, then suggested the nuns leave convent life but they remained and withstood the town's sieges, despite being particularly close to the town's ramparts, and the province's annexation by France in October 1794. The new government was hostile to the religious nature of the society and between that and the previous experiences, Lynch's health failed. She died 22 June 1799.
