= Patricia Clementina =

Patricia Clementina (fl. 590), was a politically active aristocrat in Byzantine Naples in the late 6th century. She is mentioned in the letters and documents of Gregory the Great, and exemplifies the unusual degree of influence females could have in Byzantine Italy.

Clementina is called patricia and was a very wealthy aristocrat and landowner with her own court. She was powerful in her own right because of her great wealth and not because she was related to powerful men, which was somewhat unusual in her time. She was a controversial political figure in southern Italy and known for her involvement in the local religious conflicts and power struggles between powerful clerics and kept in contact with papal envoys. At one point, a peasant revolt broke out on one of her estates. Clementina attempted to prevent the election of bishop Amandus of Sorrento because she wished for him to stay in her entourage.

== Sources ==
- Chris Wickham: The Inheritance of Rome: A History of Europe from 400 to 1000
