= Clementine (2004 film) =

2004 action-drama film

- Official movie poster
- Directed by: Kim Du-yeong
- Written by: Eun Hye-rim
- Produced by: Mark Hicks
- Starring: Lee Dong-jun; Steven Seagal
- Cinematography: Ku Gyu-hwan; Thomas Kuo
- Edited by: Kang Myeong-Hwan
- Music by: Lee Sang-ho
- Distributed by: Pulstar Pictures
- Release date: December 14, 2004
- Running time: 100 minutes
- Countries: South Korea; United States
- Languages: English; Korean

Clementine (Korean: 클레멘타인) is a 2004 action-drama film directed by Kim De-yeong.

The film is about Kim Seung-hyeon, a taekwondo champion who decides to give up his fighting career for good in order to take care of his daughter Sarang. But when an evil gambling kingpin kidnaps Sarang, Kim must agree to fight in a rigged boxing match in exchange for Sarang's freedom.

In this film, the actor Steven Seagal plays a 10-minute role as "cage fight champion" Jack Miller. Apparently, he was "misled" by the producers into believing the film would only be released in Korea. Upon release, the film failed at the box office and received negative reviews from critics.
