= Immaculate Conception Cathedral, Juticalpa =

Immaculate Conception Cathedral
- Catedral de la Inmaculada Concepción
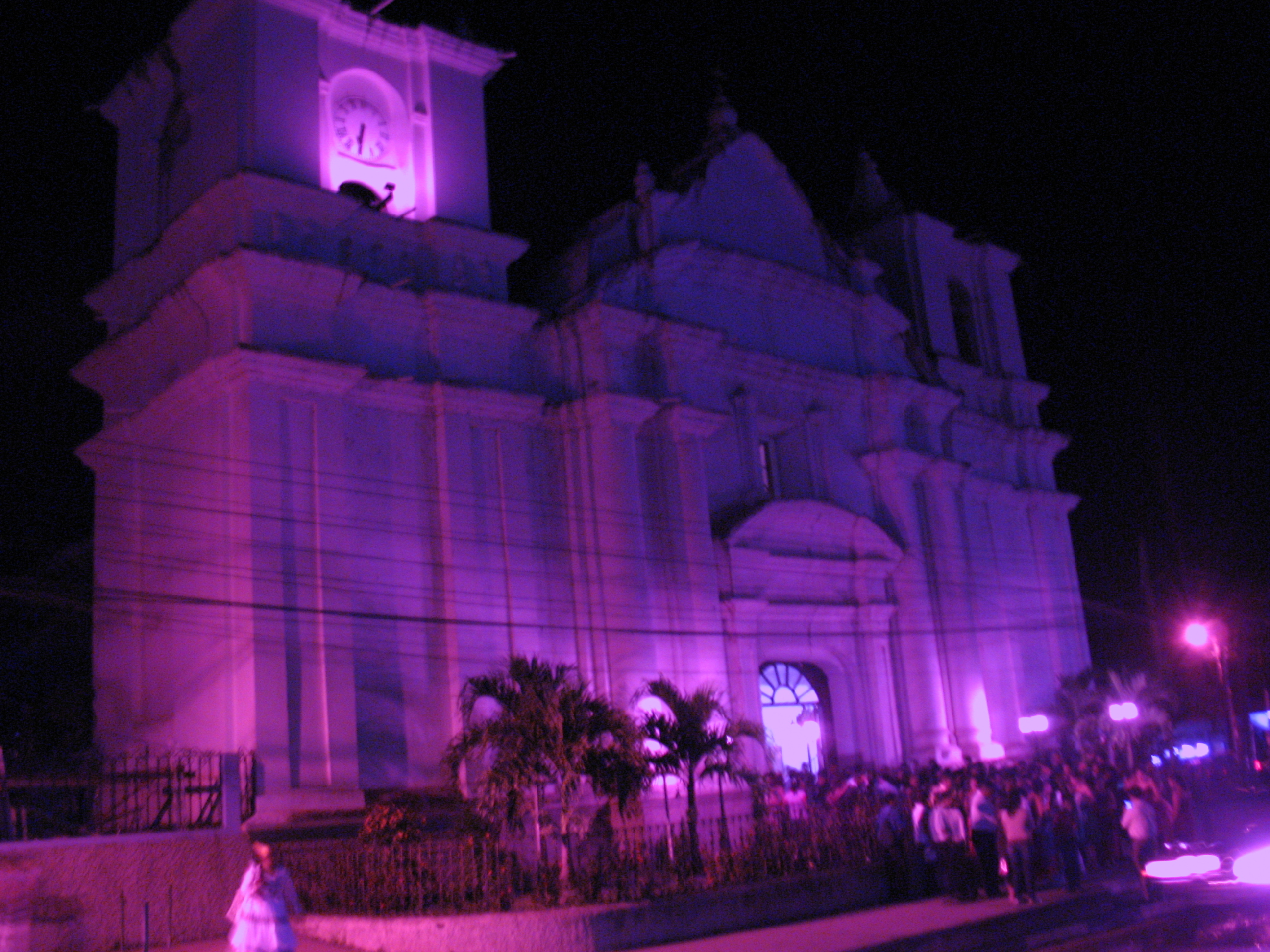
- Immaculate Conception Cathedral
- Location: Juticalpa
- Country: Honduras
- Denomination: Roman Catholic Church

The Immaculate Conception Cathedral (Spanish: Catedral de la Inmaculada Concepción, also Juticalpa Cathedral) is a Catholic Church located in the city of Juticalpa, in the department of Olancho, part of the Central American country of Honduras. It is one of the four cathedrals dedicated to the Immaculate Conception of St. Mary in Honduran territory, the others being Choluteca, Comayagua and Danlí.

== History ==
According to one historian, it was Fray Antonio Bertrand in 1734 who first called for a church to be built in Juticalpa, asking for funds from the Captaincy General of Guatemala. Members of the local community contributed according to their means, as well as parishioners. Not much is known about this original church. Work on a new building commenced in 1835 by the master builder Hipólito Estrada. His work was interrupted and Enrique Cañas continued. The high altar was built by Coronado Chávez, and it was covered with ten pounds of gold paint. The temple was finished in 1847. The clock that is in one of the towers was donated by Juan Vilardebó and his wife Irene Güell on December 8, 1875.

The temple follows the Roman or Latin rite and is the mother church of the diocese of Juticalpa (Dioecesis Iuticalpensis). It was created as a territorial prelature in 1949, and elevated to its current status in 1987 through the bull "Universae Dei" of Pope John Paul II. It is under the pastoral responsibility of Bishop José Bonello.

== See also ==
- Roman Catholicism in Honduras
- Immaculate Conception
