= Clementine Deymann =

German priest and prison chaplain

Clementine Deymann (24 June 1844 – 4 December 1896) was a German priest and prison chaplain.

== Biography ==
Deymann was born at Stavern, Germany on 24 June 1844. He came to America with his parents in 1863, studied at Teutopolis, Illinois, received the habit of St. Francis and the name Clementine at the same place, 8 December 1867, finished his theological studies, and was ordained priest at St. Louis, Missouri, 19 May 1872.

Clementine was stationed as professor at the college of Teutopolis until July 1879, when he was transferred to Joliet, to act as chaplain of the State prison. At Joliet he was also spiritual director of the School Sisters of St. Francis. In August 1880, he was appointed superior and pastor of the German parish of Joliet, and in July 1882, he received a like position at Chillicothe, Missouri.

In 1885 and in 1891, Clementine was elected definitor of the Franciscan province of the Sacred Heart; in 1886 he was made superior of the boys' orphanage at Watsonville, California.

He was appointed 22 July 1896 as the first commissary for the newly erected Franciscan commissariat of the Pacific Coast, but died in Phoenix, Arizona on 4 December 1896 shortly after receiving this office and was buried at Santa Barbara.

== Works ==
Clementine translated a number of religious works, including:

- The Seraphic Octave, or Retreat (1883)
- Life of St. Francisco Solano
- Life of Blessed Crescentia Hoess
- May Devotions (1884)

His original writings are:

- Manual for the Sisters of the Third Order (1884)
- St. Francis Manual (1884)

He also wrote for several periodicals, and left in manuscript translations from the Spanish of the lives of Junípero Serra and Antonio Margil.
