= Froylán Turcios =

Honduran politician

Froylán Turcios (July 7, 1875 – November 19, 1943) was a Honduran writer, journalist and politician. He is considered one of the most important Honduran intellectuals of the early 20th century.

== Background and political roles ==
He was born in Juticalpa, Olancho. He was Minister of Interior, Member of the National Congress of Honduras and delegate to the League of Nations in Geneva.

He was private secretary of guerrilla Augusto César Sandino in Nicaragua, a personal friend of Rubén Darío, Juan Ramón Molina and many other intellectuals and philosophers.

== Writing activities ==
He directed the Tegucigalpa daily paper El Tiempo and founded the journals, El Pensamiento (1894), Revista Nueva (1902), Arte y Letras (1903) and Esfinge (1905), among others. In Guatemala he published the newspapers El Tiempo ( 1904),El Domingo (1908) and in Honduras El Heraldo (1909), El Nuevo Tiempo (1911), and Boletín de La Defensa Nacional (1924 -- see below).

=== Violent themes ===
Turcios was especially against American involvement in Honduras, bitterly so. In March 1924, following the occupation of Tegucigalpa's central plaza by a force of nearly 200 United States marines, Turcios commenced publication of a series of newsletters called the Bulletin of National Defense (Boletín de la Defensa Nacional), a medium through which Hondurans and other Latin Americans -- primarily intellectuals and journalists -- protested the US invasion.

His literature tended to be violent stories, influenced by the Italian writer Gabriele D'Annunzio, with strong plots; indeed, in 'La Mejor Limosna' (The Best Act of Charity), from Cuentos del Amor y la Muerte (Stories of Love and Death) (1930), Turcios' narrator seemingly advocates 'mercy killings'.

== Works ==
- Mariposas (1895)
- Renglones (1899)
- Hojas de Otoño (1905)
- Anabel Lee (1906)
- El Vampiro (1910)
- Tierra Materna (1911)
- El Fantasma Blanco (1911)
- Prosas nuevas (1914)
- Floresita sonora (1915)
- Cuentos del Amor y la Muerte (1930)
- Páginas del Ayer (1932)

== Death ==
He died in San Jose, Costa Rica but was returned to Honduras and buried in Tegucigalpa.
