= Clementine Jacoby =

American software engineer and criminal justice reform activist

- Education: Stanford University
- Employer(s): Google; Recidiviz

Clementine Jacoby is an American software engineer and criminal justice reform activist. She is a founder and executive director at Recidiviz. She was listed in Forbes 30 Under 30 in 2021 and named as a TED fellow in 2022.

== Early life and education ==
Jacoby was a student at Stanford University, where she studied symbolic systems. She spent one year of her studies in a circus in Brazil, where she taught acrobatics to gang members. This experience prompted her to carefully evaluate the criminal justice system. She worked at OPower, a platform which helped people make better decisions about their energy usage using behavioral economics.

== Career ==
Jacoby joined Google where she worked on augmented mobile games. She became increasingly concerned about the high numbers of people imprisoned in the United States. In particular, she looked for low-cost solutions to mass incarceration. Of the 2.5 million incarcerated Americans, hundreds of thousands pose no risk to public safety. One in four prison admissions occur not because someone committed a crime but because they violated rules whilst on supervision. However, the data required to free them from prison is often distributed across several departments. Jacoby's work looks to make real-time data available for justice agencies and, ultimately, reduce recidivism.

Jacoby is the Founder and executive director of Recidiviz, a nonprofit platform that allows states to collect, clean, standardize and share fragmented data. It collects data from prisons, probation and parole. Recidiviz makes use of an algorithm to recommend people for early release, so-called smart decarceration. In the two years following its launch, Recidiviz was responsible for the release of over 40,000 inmates.

As COVID-19 spread through prison populations, North Dakota made use of Recidiviz to identify inmates who were eligible for release. In one month, prison populations in North Dakota were reduced by 25%. Jacoby partnered with the Charles Koch Institute to expand Recidiviz to 15 states.

== Awards and honors ==
- 2020 Fast Company's Most Creative People
- 2021 TIME100 NEXT
- 2021 Forbes 30 Under 30
- 2022 Appointed TED fellow
