= Clementine (series) =

2006 children's novel

- Author: Sara Pennypacker
- Illustrator: Marla Frazee
- Country: United States
- Language: English
- Genre: Realistic fiction
- Publisher: Disney/Hyperion
- No. of books: 7
- Website: The Clementine series

Clementine is a series of children's chapter books written by Sara Pennypacker and illustrated by Marla Frazee. Debuting with the eponymous title Clementine in 2006, the seven books in the series follow the eccentric and lovable, yet unintentionally devious, eight-year-old Clementine through third grade.

== Premise ==
The books are focused on an eight-year-old, artistic, but impulsive girl named Clementine, characterized by her flaming red curls. In spite of her good but misunderstood intentions, she frequently finds herself being sent to the principal's office for her lack of cooperation and characteristic imperfections. Other characters include Clementine's loving, understanding parents, her unnamed younger brother (labelled with a vast assortment of nicknames relating to vegetables by his elder sister), her sister Summer, her pet kitten Moisturizer, and Margaret, Clementine's strict, partially stuck-up, but kindhearted best friend. The books are set in Boston.

== Characters ==
Clementine, a kind, gifted, artistic, but impulsive and unpredictable little girl characterized by her multiple personality quirks. Albeit her intentions are good, she is commonly misunderstood by many authority figures around her and often finds herself being sent to the principal's office. Unintentionally troublemaking, but childishly innocent, Clementine frequently brings up her love of gorillas and her desire to own one someday as a pet. She possesses artistic talent and loves to draw, and her drawings are frequently shown throughout the course of the series.

Margaret, Clementine's closest friend, who is depicted as being a year older than she is. She often shows little tolerance for Clementine's eccentricities and enjoys domineering other people, particularly those younger than she (who she perceives as being of lesser authority than she is), and shows a few uptight and snobbish personality traits (she enjoys showing off). She is overall a good friend and has performed great acts of kindness on Clementine's behalf before in the past. She has a baseball-loving teenage brother named Mitchell, who makes frequent appearances throughout the course of the series. In the first title, Clementine cuts off a majority of Margaret's hair, resulting in a rather disastrous week at school for her. She is a massive germophobe.

Mitchell is the name of Margaret's adolescent older brother, an enthusiast of the Boston Red Sox. Depicted with a comical sense of humor, he enjoys teasing Margaret frequently and irritating her, and gets along well with Clementine (who believes that he is "trying to be her boyfriend"), and he apparently enjoys her company. His sister appears to be easily annoyed with him.

Bill, Clementine's father, who works as the manager of the apartment building in which a majority of the series's main characters reside. Fun-loving and understanding with his daughter, he enlists Clementine's assistance in fighting off the "Great Pigeon War" (finding a method of repelling the pigeons attracted to the stone statues molded into the building), which Clementine successfully resolves, and a celebration is held in her honor at the book's conclusion. Although there have been many occasions where he finds himself being agitated by Clementine's antics, he is quite forgiving. Although his wife and son remain unnamed, Bill's name has been revealed on several occasions.

Clementine's Mother, an unnamed mother who is an artist. Though she is portrayed as being understanding and kind with her daughter, she, too, has found herself exasperated with her daughter's uncooperativeness (such as in the first book of the series, where Clementine constantly somehow finds herself in trouble through the course of a single week at school). In Clementine and the Family Meeting, she becomes pregnant, much to Clementine's chagrin.

Clementine's Younger Brother, an unnamed younger brother who is a toddler. Due to the perceived unfairness of Clementine's "fruit name", she labels him with a vast array of nicknames related to vegetables, so because of this his name has never been given. He apparently suffers from a severe peanut allergy and enjoys playing with his own feet.

Olive, is a character in Clementine and the Spring Trip, who joins Clementine's class and befriends Clementine. She made a language from her own name, called Olive, and the entire class learns it, except Clementine. Olive teaches Clementine how to speak Olive.

== Titles ==
1. Clementine (2006): After cutting off most of Margaret's hair, Clementine inadvertently winds up landing herself in multiple punishments at school.
2. The Talented Clementine (2007): Clementine fears for the upcoming talent competition taking place at her school, as she is unsure of what skill to demonstrate.
3. Clementine's Letter (2008): When Clementine's teacher is nominated for the reward of an Egyptian archaeology expedition lasting for the remainder of the year if his students write letters explaining why he deserves to be selected, Clementine worries that her teacher will be picked and writes a negative letter.
4. Clementine: Friend of the Week (2010): Clementine is chosen for the position of "Friend of the Week" in her classroom, where her classmates create a book of her positive personality aspects. Her beloved kitten Moisturizer suddenly vanishes, and after seeing Margaret's phenomenal album crafted by her schoolmates, she fears that hers will not be quite as positive.
5. Clementine and The Family Meeting (2011): Clementine's mother reveals herself to be pregnant, much to her daughter's dismay. Clementine fears for the changes that potentially might be made to her home life as a result to the birth of a new younger sibling.
6. Clementine and the Spring Trip (2013): Clementine is ready for the school trip to Plimoth Plantation, but is worried about having lunch there, learning Olive-language, and surviving The Cloud on Bus 7.
7. Completely Clementine (2015): Clementine is not ready for summer, to start speaking to her father again after being mad at him for eating meat, the new baby on the way, or saying good-bye to her third grade teacher.

== Awards ==
- 2007: Clementine, Boston Globe–Horn Book Honor
- 2007: Clementine, Sid Fleischman Award, SCWBI
- 2007: Clementine, Josette Frank Award
- 2008: Clementine, Rhode Island Children's Book Award
- 2009: Clementine, William Allen White Children's Book Award (Grades 3–5)
