= Clementina Batalla =

Mexican lawyer, teacher and women's rights activist

Clementina Batalla (1894–1987) was a Mexican lawyer, teacher and women's rights activist.

At age 20, Batalla was one of the first female law students in Mexico. In 1920, she was admitted as a lawyer in the National School of Jurisprudence, which made her the second lawyer received in her alma mater. Batalla founded the Union of Mexican Women, which in 1964 held its first Annual Congress.
