= Clementina Butler =

American evangelist and author

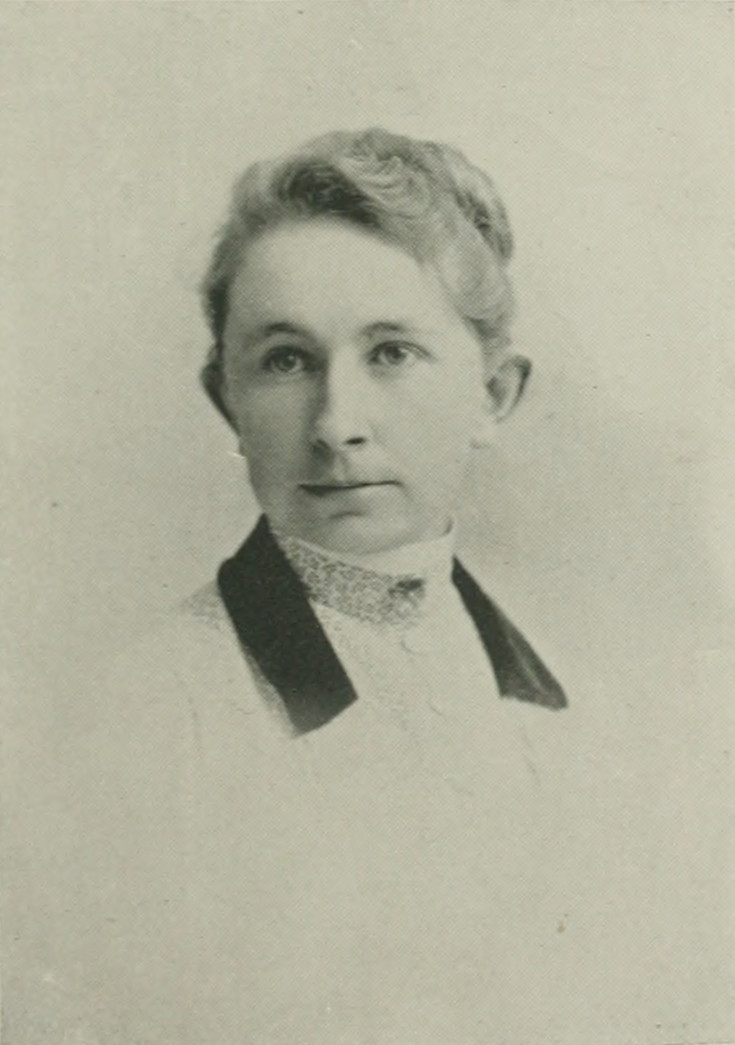
- Photo in A Woman of the Century
- Born: January 7, 1862; Bareilly, British India
- Died: December 5, 1949 (aged 87); Boston, Massachusetts, U.S.
- Resting place: Newton Cemetery, Newton, Massachusetts
- Citizenship: American
- Occupations: evangelist, author
- Parents: William Butler; Clementina Rowe Butler
- Writing career
- Genre: biography

Clementina Butler (January 7, 1862 – December 5, 1949) was an American evangelist and author. She was a founder of the Ramabai Association, an organization that established the first school in India for widowed women. She was also the founder and chair of the "Committee on Christian Literature for Women and Children in Mission Fields, Inc. In addition to other writings, she was the author of three biographies: her father's (William Butler : the founder of two missions, 1902), her mother's (Mrs. William Butler: Two Empires and the Kingdom, 1929), as well as Pandita Ramabai Sarasvati : pioneer in the movement for the education of the child-widow of India (1922).

== Early life ==
Clementina Butler was born in Bareilly, British India, January 7, 1862. Her father, Rev. Dr. William Butler, was commissioned in 1856 to open mission work for the Methodist Episcopal Church. Her mother, Clementina Rowe Butler, was a co-founder of the Woman's Foreign Missionary Society of the Methodist Episcopal Church. Her brother, John Wesley Butler, was an author and served as a Methodist missionary to Mexico for more than four decades.

After passing through great perils during the Sepoy rebellion of 1857, Bareilly was settled as headquarters. The family moved their home seventeen times during the next eight years according to the needs of the work. Returning to the United States, after a few years' rest, Dr. Butler was requested to organize mission work in Mexico. There the linguistic ability of the daughter was of great service.

== Career ==
In 1884, Butler went with her parents to revisit India, and her observations during an extended tour in that country served as the theme of many of her addresses and articles. On account of the infirmities of age and the heavy responsibilities they bore for so long, Dr. and Mrs. Butler settled quietly in Newton Centre, Massachusetts, and from their home, the daughter went out to inspire others with her own belief in the possibilities for women everywhere, when aided by Christianity. Butler was interested in missionary work of all kinds, medical missions for the women of the East being her favorite subject. As a King's Daughter, she worked in the slums of Boston, besides pleading in the churches and on public platforms for the needy in other countries. A short residence in Alaska gave her an insight into the condition of the people there, and she was a champion of their rights in regard to suitable educational grants and the enforcement of the laws prohibiting the sale of liquor in that Territory.

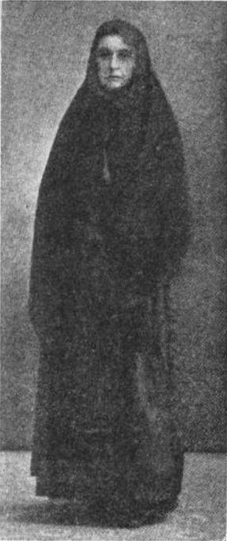
Butler was obliged to adopt this Mexican dress in order to get out of Puebla, Mexico.

In January 1914, she left for Mexico with her brother, John, the missionary, where she was to relieve the principal of the school at Puebla. In April, the United States occupation of Veracruz seriously affected the missionary school and Butler was forced to flee Mexico and return to the U.S.

Butler was her father's assistant in his literary work. She also wrote for missionary publications. She established magazines for children in Burma, China, India, Japan, Korea, and Latin America; and was the author of books for women in India. Butler was the author of her parents' biographies, William Butler: The Founder of Two Missions (1902) and Mrs. William Butler: Two Empires and the Kingdom (1929).

A member of the Tremont Street Methodist Episcopal Church, Butler founded a missionary museum within it and fundraised for windows.

== Later life and death ==
In 1933, Butler retired as an executive of the Woman's Foreign Missionary Society of the Methodist Episcopal Church after being active in its service for five decades. At some point, she removed from Newton Centre to live in Barrington, Rhode Island with her sister, Mrs. William H. Thurber.

Butler's death at Hotel Brunswick in Boston, December 5, 1949, was sudden. Interment was at the Newton Cemetery.

== Selected works ==
- William Butler : the founder of two missions of the Methodist Episcopal Church. By this daughter. With an Introduction by Bishop C. C. McCabe (1902) (Text)
- Pandita Ramabai Sarasvati : pioneer in the movement for the education of the child-widow of India (1922) (Text)
- Ownership : God is the owner, I am His steward. By Clementina Butler, Author of "Pandita Ramabai Sarasvati" (1927) (Text)
- Mrs. William Butler: Two Empires and the Kingdom. By the same author, "William Butler" (1929) (Text)
- Newest thing in "A.B.C.'s" (19--) (Text)
