= Walter Robertson (artist) =

Irish painter

- Born: c. 1750; Dublin
- Died: 1801 (aged 50–51); Fatehpur Sikri, India
- Known for: miniature-painting

Walter Robertson (c. 1750 – 1801) was an Irish miniature-painter, known as the "Irish Robertson" in the United States.

== Life ==
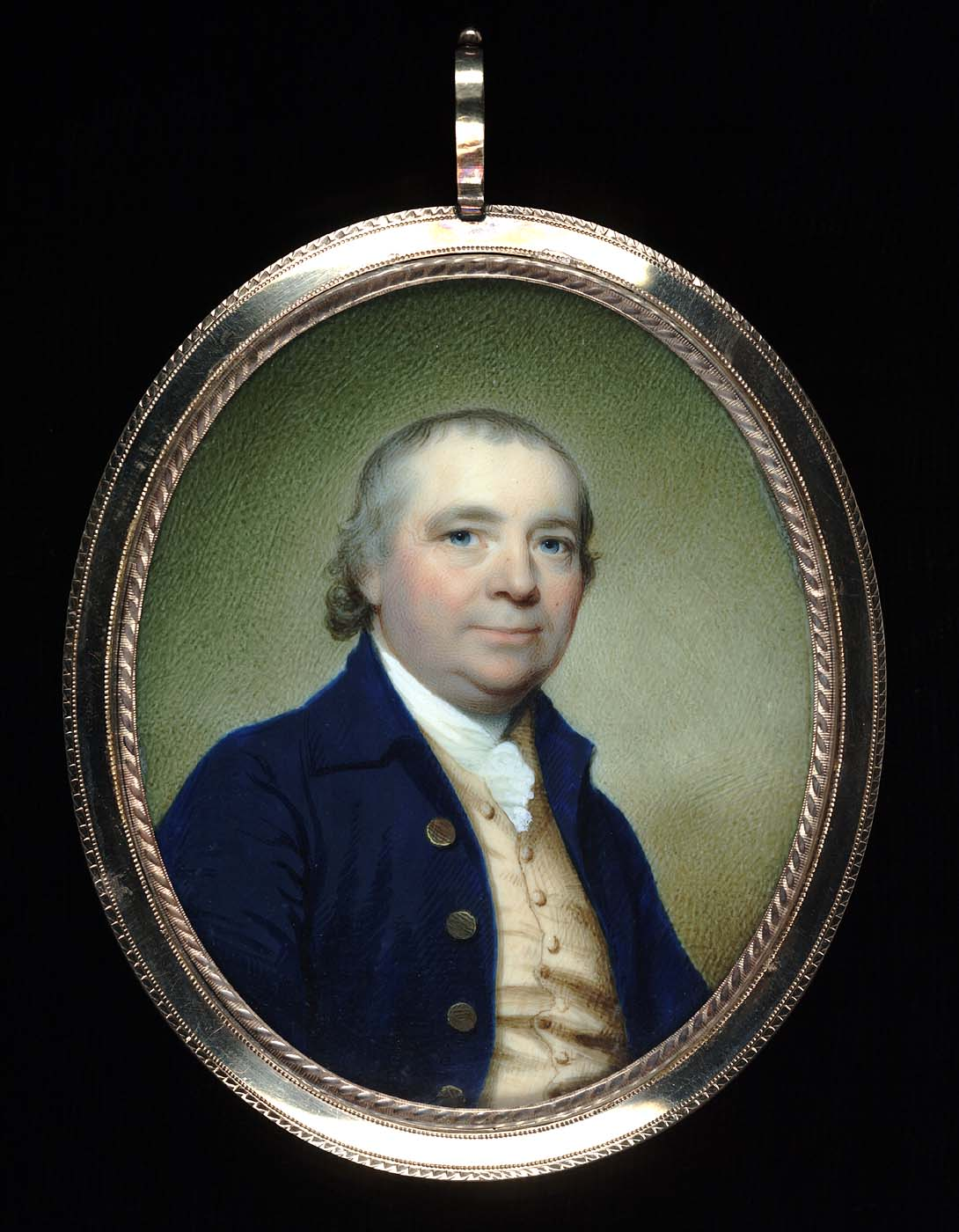
Captain Joseph Anthony by Robertson (1794), held in the Smithsonian American Art Museum

Walter Robertson was born in Dublin around 1750. The Robertsons were a family of miniaturists and jewellers who lived on Ormond Quay. He was possibly related to Alexander Robertson who died in July 1768 in Ormond Quay. In 1765, Robertson was enrolled in the Dublin Society's School of Drawing where he excelled at draughtsmanship and in 1766 won a prize of £2 for this human studies. He set up his miniature-portrait studio on Essex Street soon after, and exhibited with the Society of Artists from 1767 to 1777, showing "designs in hair, likenesses, and miniatures". His younger brother, Charles, lived and possibly trained with him at this time. From 1784 to 1792 he lived in London continuing as a portrait painter.

Robertson returned to Dublin, where he was declared bankrupt. This resulted in his property, a number of houses he had built on Great Britain Street, Cavendish Row, and North Strand, being sold at auction. He had relied heavily on his friend and fellow artist, Gilbert Stuart, for a steady supply of sitters but the 1792 suspension of parliament left Robertson with very few clients. Both Robertson and Stuart were in severe financial difficulties, and both left for the America in 1793. There is no record of what became of Robertson's family during this time. He initially lived with John James Barralet in Philadelphia and in 1794 he was commissioned to paint a portrait of George Washington. This portrait was also made into an engraving, and Robertson later painted portraits of Martha Washington and other notable American political figures. During this time he was known as the "Irish Robertson" to distinguish him from two Scottish miniaturists also called Robertson.

Robertson left America for India in 1795. He died in 1801 in Fatehpur Sikri. The Smithsonian Institution hold examples of his work.

Robertson married twice, firstly to Margaret Bentley in 1771 who is thought to have predeceased him, and secondly Eleanor Robertson in 1781.
