= Clementine Mukeka =

Rwandan public administrator

Permanent Secretary of the Ministry of Foreign Affairs and International Cooperation of Rwanda
- In office May 2020 – November 2025
- Appointed by: Paul Kagame

Personal details
- Education: London South Bank University; IDRAC Business School; Princeton University
- Occupation: Senior government official

Mrs. Clementine Mukeka

Clementine Mukeka is a Rwandan international relations professional who served as Permanent Secretary of the Ministry of Foreign Affairs and International Cooperation from May 2020 to November 2025, following her appointment by President Paul Kagame. In this role, she headed the ministry's administration and represented Rwanda in bilateral consultations and in regional and multilateral fora, including the East African Community, the African Union, COMESA, the International Conference on the Great Lakes Region and the United Nations. She led the ministry's preparations for several major international meetings hosted in Kigali, including the second African Union–European Union Ministerial Meeting in 2021, the Commonwealth Heads of Government Meeting (CHOGM) in 2022, and the 46th Ministerial Conference of La Francophonie in 2025.Before her appointment, she worked for the United States government in Rwanda, at the U.S. Embassy in Kigali and as Trade Advisor at USAID. She began her career in the private sector in France and the United States.

== Education ==
Mukeka holds a Bachelor’s degree (Hons) in Business Administration from London South Bank University (2007) and a Master 1 in marketing, sales and business management, with a specialisation in corporate finance, from IDRAC Business School in Lyon (2009). She is also an alumna of the New York University School of Professional Studies.

She is a Fulbright scholar in the mid-career Master in Public Policy program at the Princeton School of Public and International Affairs.

== Career ==
=== Private sector ===
Mukeka began her career in sales and business development. She was business developer and export coordinator for sub-Saharan Africa at Technochem International Corp., a New York-based polyurethane manufacturer, covering markets including Nigeria, Ghana, South Africa and Côte d'Ivoire. In Lyon, she worked in sales for Keyrus, a business intelligence consulting firm, as well as for Accor and the Centre de Congrès de Lyon (GL Events).

=== United States government in Rwanda ===
In 2012, Mukeka joined the U.S. Embassy in Kigali in the Ambassador's Executive Office, before serving as Economic and Commercial Specialist, covering economic diplomacy, trade and regional integration. She later became Trade Advisor for USAID Rwanda, working on trade facilitation and regional integration programs in East Africa.

=== Permanent Secretary of Foreign Affairs ===
In 2020, President Paul Kagame appointed Mukeka Permanent Secretary of the Ministry of Foreign Affairs and International Cooperation, the ministry's most senior civil servant. She held the post until December 2025.

Her tenure covered several major international meetings hosted by Rwanda. She represented Rwanda at the Commonwealth Liaison Committee and Open-Ended Working Group, where she briefed member countries on the preparations and key themes of the 2022 Commonwealth Heads of Government Meeting.

She led or co-chaired numerous bilateral political consultations and joint commissions with partner countries across Africa, Europe, Asia and the Americas. These included the inaugural political consultations between Rwanda and Pakistan, Switzerland and Brazil, as well as consultations with Finland and Georgia, among others.

In the region, she led joint permanent commissions with neighbouring and regional partners. With Uganda, she co-chaired the senior officials' segment of the 11th Rwanda–Uganda Joint Permanent Commission and a bilateral meeting on cross-border cooperation in Nyagatare District, covering the movement of people and goods, trade, customs, health, border demarcation and security. She also welcomed a U.S. Congressional delegation to discuss Rwanda's foreign policy priorities and Rwanda–United States relations.
