= Joe Bonello =

Maltese bishop

His Excellency Joe Bonello O.F.M.
- Bishop of Juticalpa
- Church: Roman Catholic
- Diocese: Juticalpa
- Appointed: 22 November 2010
- Installed: 12 February 2011
- Predecessor: Tomás Andrés Mauro Muldoon
- Previous post: Coadjutor Bishop of Juticalpa (2010-2011)

Orders
- Ordination: 7 July 1985 by Joseph Mercieca
- Consecration: 12 February 2011 by Óscar Andrés Rodríguez Maradiaga
- Rank: Bishop

Personal details
- Born: Joseph Bonello; 4 April 1961 (age 65) Xagħra Gozo Malta

Joseph Bonello (born 4 April 1961) is a Maltese bishop who currently serves as the bishop of Juticalpa in Honduras.

Joe Bonello was born in Xagħra on the island of Gozo in Malta on 4 April 1961, the third of four children. In 1977 he joined the Franciscan novitiate in Għajnsielem and six years later was professed as a member of the Order of Friars Minor. He was ordained deacon on 29 June 1984 and a year later a priest by Archbishop Joseph Mercieca. Bonello studied philosophy and theology at the National Institute of Religious Ecclesiastical Studies in Malta and in September 1989 he left for a mission in Central America. During his time in Central America he served as he served as pastor of many parishes including that of Santa Ana in La Libertad.

In 2009 Bonello was appointed vicar general of the Diocese of Comayagua by its bishop Roberto Camilleri Azzopardi. A year later on 22 November 2010 Pope Benedict XVI appointed him Coadjutor Bishop of Juticalpa in Honduras. He was consecrated bishop by Cardinal Óscar Andrés Rodríguez Maradiaga on 12 February 2011. After the resignation of bishop Tomás Andrés Mauro Muldoon, Bonello succeeded him as the Bishop of Juticalpa.
