= Talgua River =

Location
- Country: Honduras

The Talgua River (Spanish pronunciation: [ˈtalɣwa]) or Río Talgua is a river in the Catacamas of Honduras.
