= Clementina Suárez =

Honduran writer

- Born: 12 May 1902; Juticalpa, Honduras
- Died: 1991 (aged 88–89); Tegucigalpa, Honduras
- Occupations: Poet, Writer
- Children: 2

Clementina Suárez (12 May 1902 – 1991) was an early Honduran writer, who broke social norms. She was the first woman to publish a book of poetry in Honduras and is now recognized as the 'Honduran matriarch poet'. Clementina was an influential person of art and culture of Honduras and Central America.

== Life ==
Suárez was a Bohemian who loved to frequent cafes. Since she was little she got used to getting whatever she wanted and doing whatever she felt like. It didn't bother her that she was the only woman who frequented the tobacco shop "Mamá llaca" in the neighborhood La Ronda de Tegucigalpa.

Truthfully Clementina's education was that of the people. Clementina was called the "New Woman" in Honduras.

Suárez was born in Juticalpa in 1902 to Amelia Zelaya Bustillo and Luis Suarez. She attended public school until fifth grade. In 1923 her father died, and Suárez left her rural family home without financial support or the support of her mother. She had frequent troubles such as lack of food and water, and other things such as strangers and a huge fear of kidnappers as she traveled, hence she was so young. Eventually, she made her first destinations were town where she had relatives who provided a place for her to stay. She lived and worked various jobs in Trujillo, La Ceiba, San Pedro, Tela, and finally Tegucigalpa, all while writing. She eventually moved in with Marco Antonio Rosa, also a writer. They had two daughters together, however, never married. Shortly after the birth of her second daughter, the poet, now 27, left Rosa and married Guillermo Bustillo Reina, but the marriage ended after less than a year. Then, in 1948, she married the prominent visual artist, Jose Mejia Vides.

She worked as a waitress to feed herself and her two children, but she still wrote. She wore shorts and a bikini, celebrating her body not only in life but also in her poetry. She was seen as a free woman, independent and outspoken. Tegucigalpa was shocked because of her modern way of behaving and breaking established rules traditionally attached to "feminine" behaviour. She was also the first woman to publish a book in Honduras.

In December 1991 delinquents were merciless to her. The poet Roberto Sosa did her final interview.

Her first two published poems reflected her independent character. She walked the streets of the capital dressed as a bellboy to sell her work when she published six issues of a journal named Mujer (woman). In 1936–7 she was in Cuba seeing its resistance against fascism. This observation and the news of the Spanish Civil War is thought to have expanded Suárez's horizons.

She founded the Gallery of Central American Art while in political exile in Mexico in the 1940s. In the 1950s she created an artist's gallery El Rancho del Artista in El Salvador which was open to the public as well as serving as a community. She returned to her home country in 1958.

The National Honduras University published an anthology of her poetry and the following year, 1970, she was given a national award for her work in literature. Suárez mixed with the literati and she knew the Nobel Prize winners Pablo Neruda and Miguel Angel Asturias. She died in Tegucigalpa in 1991.

== Legacy ==
Suárez was honoured with a Honduran stamp in 1999. She has been said to be her country's premier woman poet. She was also said to be the first woman in Honduras to wear shorts and lipstick; which together with appearing naked reading communist revolutionary poetry, added to her infamous reputation. There is a book and a film about her life and there are said to be portraits of her by the Mexican painter Diego Rivera, the Costa Rican painter Francisco Amighetti and Camilo Minero from El Salvador.

== Bibliography ==
- Janet N. Gold (January 1995). Clementina Suárez: Her Life and Poetry. University Press of Florida. ISBN 978-0-8130-1337-4.
