= Sara Pennypacker =

American author of children's literature

Sara Pennypacker is an American author of children's books. Her books, some of which have featured on the New York Times bestselling list, include The Lions' Run, Leeva At Last, Pax, Summer of the Gypsy Moths, the Clementine series, the Waylon series, and the Stuart books.

== Career ==
Pennypacker has written many children's books, including The Lions' Run, Leeva At Last, Pax, Pax Journey Home, Here in the Real World, Summer of the Gypsy Moths, the Clementine series, the Waylon series, and the Stuart books.

== Critical reception ==
Pax was one of ten books making the longlist for the National Book Award for Young People's Literature in 2016. It was on The New York Times bestseller list for 54 weeks, reaching number 1.

She received a Christopher Award for Clementine's Letter and the Golden Kite Award for Pierre In Love. She received Boston Globe and Horn Book awards for Clementine.

Clementine, Clementine and the Family Meeting, Clementine's Letter, The Talented Clementine, Stuart Goes to School, Pax, Summer of the Gypsy Moths, and The Mount Rushmore Calamity received starred reviews from Kirkus Reviews.

Summer of the Gypsy Moths, Clementine, Pax, Dumbstuck and Here in the Real World received starred reviews from Publishers Weekly.

Pax, Meet the Dullards, and Summer of the Gypsy Moths received starred reviews from School Library Journal.

== Works ==
- Pax (Balzer + Bray/HarperCollins, 2016). Illustrated by Jon Klassen.
- The Lion's Run (Balzer + Bray, 2026). Illustrated by Jon Klassen
- Pax Journey Home (Balzer + Bray/HarperCollins, 2021). Illustrated by Jon Klassen.
- Here in the Real World (Balzer + Bray/HarperCollins, 2020)
- Summer of the Gypsy Moths (Balzer + Bray/HarperCollins, 2012)
- Dumbstruck (Holiday House, 1994). Illustrated by Mary Jane Auch.

=== Waylon books ===
- Waylon! One Awesome Thing (Disney-Hyperion, 2016)
- Waylon! Even More Awesome (Disney-Hyperion, 2018)
- Waylon! The Most Awesome of All (Disney-Hyperion, 2019)

=== Clementine books ===
Illustrated by Marla Frazee

- Clementine (Hyperion, 2006)
- The Talented Clementine (Hyperion, 2007)
- Clementine's Letter (Hyperion, 2008)
- Clementine, Friend of the Week (Disney-Hyperion, 2010)
- Clementine and the Family Meeting (Disney-Hyperion, 2011)
- Clementine and the Spring Trip (Disney-Hyperion, 2013)
- Completely Clementine (Disney-Hyperion, 2015)

=== Stuart books ===
- Stuart's Cape (Scholastic, 2002)
- Stuart Goes to School (Orchard/Scholastic, 2005)

=== Flat Stanley books ===
- The Mount Rushmore Calamity (HarperCollins, 2009)
- The Great Egyptian Grave Robbery (HarperCollins, 2009)
- The Japanese Ninja Surprise (HarperCollins, 2009)
- The Intrepid Canadian Expedition (HaroerCollins, 2009)

=== Picture books ===
- Meet the Dullards (Balzer + Bray/HarperCollins, 2015)
- Sparrow Girl (Hyperion, 2009). Illustrated by Yoko Tanaka
- Pierre in Love (Orchard/Scholastic, 2007). Illustrated by Petra Mathers.
