= Nicholas D'Antonio Salza =

American bishop

Nicholas D'Antonio Salza, O.F.M.
- Titular Bishop of Giufi Salaria
- Church: Roman Catholic Church
- See: Giufi Salaria
- In office: 1966–2009
- Predecessor: None
- Successor: vacant
- Previous post(s): Prelate

Orders
- Ordination: June 7, 1942

Personal details
- Born: July 10, 1916; Rochester, New York
- Died: August 1, 2009 (aged 93)

Nicholas D'Antonio Salza, O.F.M. (July 10, 1916 – August 1, 2009) was an American bishop of the Roman Catholic Church.

Salza was born in Rochester, New York in 1916. He was ordained a priest on June 7, 1942, from the Order of Friars Minor. Salza was appointed prelate to Inmaculada Concepción de la B.V.M. en Olancho (Honduras) on December 18, 1963, and resigned from this position on August 6, 1977. Salza was ordained a bishop under the Titular See of Giufi Salaria on July 25, 1966. He died on August 1, 2009.
