= List of people from Tegucigalpa =

This is a list of notable people from Tegucigalpa, capital of Honduras.

== Sport ==
=== Football ===
- Jorge Álvarez, footballer
- Luis Argeñal, footballer
- Melissa Borjas, football referee
- Miguel Castillo, footballer
- Mauricio Castro, footballer
- Michaell Chirinos, footballer
- Juan Manuel Coello, footballer
- Mario Chirinos, footballer
- Emilson Cruz, footballer
- Carlos Discua, footballer
- José Escalante, footballer
- Darwin Espinal, footballer
- Harold Fonseca, footballer
- Erick Fú, footballer
- Óscar García, footballer
- Boniek García, footballer
- Axel Gómez, footballer
- Rigoberto Gómez, footballer
- Amado Guevara, football manager
- Luis Guifarro, footballer
- Alex Güity, footballer
- Astor Henríquez, footballer
- Óscar Isaula, footballer
- Emilio Izaguirre, footballer
- Júnior Izaguirre, footballer
- Allan Lalín, footballer
- Alexander López, footballer
- Denil Maldonado, footballer
- Walter Martínez, footballer, born 1982
- Walter Martínez, footballer, born 1991
- Rubén Matamoros, footballer
- Nerlin Membreño, footballer
- Juan Ramón Mejía, footballer
- David Molina, footballer
- Ramón Núñez, footballer
- César Obando, footballer
- Rigoberto Padilla, footballer
- Carlos Paes, footballer
- Milton Palacios, footballer
- Marcelo Pereira, footballer
- Carlos Pineda, footballer
- José Pinto, footballer
- Brayan Ramírez, footballer
- Cristian Raudales, footballer
- Juan Raudales, footballer
- José Reyes, footballer
- Bryan Róchez, footballer
- Luis Rodas, footballer
- Diego Rodríguez, footballer
- Roger Rojas, footballer
- César Romero, footballer
- Henry Romero, footballer
- Joseph Rosales, footballer
- Reynaldo Tilguath, footballer
- Melvin Valladares, footballer
- Edy Vásquez, footballer

=== Other sports ===
- Arturo Córdoba, runner
- Ana Galindo, swimmer
- Iizzwa Medina, table tennis player
- Bayron Molina, boxer
- Luis Alonso Morán, judoka
- Indira Murillo, journalist and basketballer
- Karen Vilorio, swimmer

== Politics ==
- Óscar Acosta, writer and politician
- Marlene Alvarenga, politician and pastor
- Yadira Bendaña, journalist and politician
- Rosa Elena Bonilla, politician
- Armando Calidonio, politician
- Rigoberto Chang Castillo, politician
- María Martha Díaz Velásquez, politician
- Mary Elizabeth Flores, journalist and politician
- Matías Funes, academic and politician
- Justo Herrera, politician
- María Josefa Lastiri, former first lady of the Federal Republic of Central America, Honduras, El Salvador, and Costa Rica
- Juan Fernando Lobo, television host and politician
- Francisco Morazán, Central American head of state and unionist; namesake of the city's department
- Salvador Nasralla, journalist and politician
- Mauricio Oliva, surgeon and politician
- Waldina Paz, politician
- Luis Redondo, politician
- Jorge Arturo Reina Idiáquez, politician
- Antonio Rivera Callejas, politician
- Joaquín Rivera, politician and military leader
- Erick Mauricio Rodríguez, politician
- Ramón Rosa, journalist and politician
- Elvin Santos, former vice president of Honduras
- Beatriz Valle, dentist, diplomat, politician, and television presenter
- Diego Vigil y Cocaña, last president of the Federal Republic of Central America
- Mauricio Villeda, politician
- José Rodolfo Zelaya, politician

=== Presidents of Honduras ===
- Marco Aurelio Soto, 1876-1883
- Policarpo Bonilla, 1895-1899
- José Trinidad Cabañas, 1852-1855
- Tiburcio Carias Andino, 27 Apr.-30 Apr. 1924, 1933-1949
- Xiomara Castro, 2022-2026
- Miguel R. Dávila, 1907-1911
- Juan Francisco de Molina, 10 Jan.-13 Apr. 1839
- Carlos Roberto Flores, 1998-2002
- Juan Manuel Gálvez, 1949-1954
- José Santos Guardiola, 1856-1862
- Rafael Leonardo Callejas, 1990-1994
- Juan Lindo, 1847-1852
- Porfirio Lobo Sosa, 2010-2014
- Rafael López Gutiérrez, 1920-1924
- Julio Lozano Díaz, 1954-1956
- Nasry Asfura, 2026-

=== Diplomats ===
- Rosalinda Bueso, diplomat
- Fernando Palma, diplomat and actor
- Ricardo Zúñiga, American diplomat

== Media, music and the arts ==
- Oscar Acosta, writer
- Eduardo Bähr, writer and actor
- Rafael Casco, surrealist style artist
- Horacio Castellanos Moya, author
- Amanda Castro, poet
- Augusto Coello, writer
- Pompeyo del Valle, poet and journalist
- Rocsi Diaz, television and radio personality
- Édgar Flores, actor
- Carlos Gutiérrez, writer and diplomat
- Guadalupe Haertling, composer
- Low Jack, DJ
- Ana Jurka, journalist
- Isabella Lovestory, singer
- Augusto Monterroso, writer
- Leticia de Oyuela, historian
- Satcha Pretto, journalist
- Roberto Sosa, poet
- Lorena Vindel, actress
- Daniel Zacapa, actor
- José Zúñiga, actor

== Science and academia ==
- Alba Alonso de Quesada, lawyer and academic
- Pablo José Cámbar, academic and physician
- Marco Tulio Medina, neurologist and scientist
- José Antonio Molina Rosito, botanist
- Salvador Moncada, pharmacologist
- Paul Carpenter Standley, American botanist
- Julissa Villanueva, forensic pathologist

== Business and law ==
- Miguel Facussé Barjum, businessman
- Miguel Estrada, attorney
- Ana García Carías, lawyer and former first lady
- Schucry Kafie, businessman
- Dante Mossi, economist
- Maya Selva, cigar maker and tobacco grower

== Religion ==
- Óscar Rodríguez Maradiaga, cardinal
- José Trinidad Reyes, priest
- Juan de Ugarte, missionary

== Other ==
- Joselina García, Miss Honduras 1997
- Carmen Juares, co-ordinator of migrant workers in Barcelona.
- Robert Seldon Lady, CIA agent
- Gladys Lanza, human rights activist
- Juan Matta-Ballesteros, drug trafficker
- Thalía Rodríguez, human rights activist.
