= Ramón Rosa National Literature Award =

- Named in honor of writer Ramón Rosa
- Awarded for: Authors whose work has national and international significance
- Sponsored by: Executive branch; Secretariat of Public Education; Secretariat of Culture, Arts, and Sports
- Location: Presidential Palace
- Country: Honduras
- First award: 1951

The Ramón Rosa National Literature Award (Spanish: Premio Nacional de Literatura Ramón Rosa) is an honor presented annually by the President of Honduras.

== History ==
Named in honor of the liberal writer and government minister Ramón Rosa (1848–1993), the award was created by legislative decree in 1949, and first given in 1951, to Luis Andrés Zúniga. It was restructured by Legislative Decree no. 100 on 11 October 1967.

It is presented annually at the Presidential Palace to a writer whose work has national and international significance.

In some years, the ceremony has been held at the Manuel Bonilla National Theater in Tegucigalpa. It is sponsored by the Civic Projects and Emergency Education Unit of the Secretariat of Public Education, the executive branch, and the Secretariat of Culture, Arts, and Sports.

== Categories ==
The Ramón Rosa National Literature Award is given for works in the areas of poetry, novel, short story, oratory and narration, journalism, drama, essay, criticism, and any other genre that contributes to the development of letters and culture in the country.

There is only one winner per year; awards are not given in the individual categories.

== Winners ==
- 1951: Luis Andrés Zúniga
- 1953: Guillermo Bustillo
- 1954: Claudio Barrera
- 1955: Jacobo Cárcamo
- 1956: Daniel Laínez
- 1959: Jacobo Cárcamo
- 1963: Guillermo Bustillo
- 1968: Argentina Díaz Lozano
- 1970: Clementina Suárez
- 1971: Medardo Mejía
- 1972: Roberto Sosa
- 1975: Julio Escoto
- 1976: Víctor Cáceres Lara
- 1977: Eliseo Pérez Cadalso
- 1979: Óscar Acosta
- 1980: Óscar Armando Flores Midence
- 1981: Pompeyo del Valle
- 1983: Antonio José Rivas
- 1984: Miguel R. Ortega
- 1986: Hernán de Jesús Cárcamo Tercero
- 1987: Felipe Elvir Rojas
- 1989: Helen Umaña
- 1990: Santos Juarez Fiallos
- 1991: Roberto Castillo
- 1992: Eduardo Bähr
- 1996: Marcos Carías Zapata
- 1999: Alfredo León Gómez
- 2000: Livio Ramírez Lozano
- 2002: Leticia de Oyuela
- 2003: José Adán Castelar
- 2005: José Luis Quesada
- 2006: Rigoberto Paredes
- 2008: Juan Antonio Medina Durón
- 2009: Nery Alexis Gaitán
- 2010: Samuel Villeda Arita
- 2011: Aída Castañeda
- 2012: Luis Alonso Gómez Oyuela
- 2013: Luis Roberto Castellanos
- 2014: Aída Castellanos Pineda
- 2015: Kalton Harold Bruhl
- 2016: Juan Ramón Martínez
- 2017: Mario Hernán Ramírez
- 2018: Víctor Manuel Ramos
- 2019: Jorge Fausto Medina García
