= Peter Hotez =

American scientist, pediatrician, and advocate (born 1958)

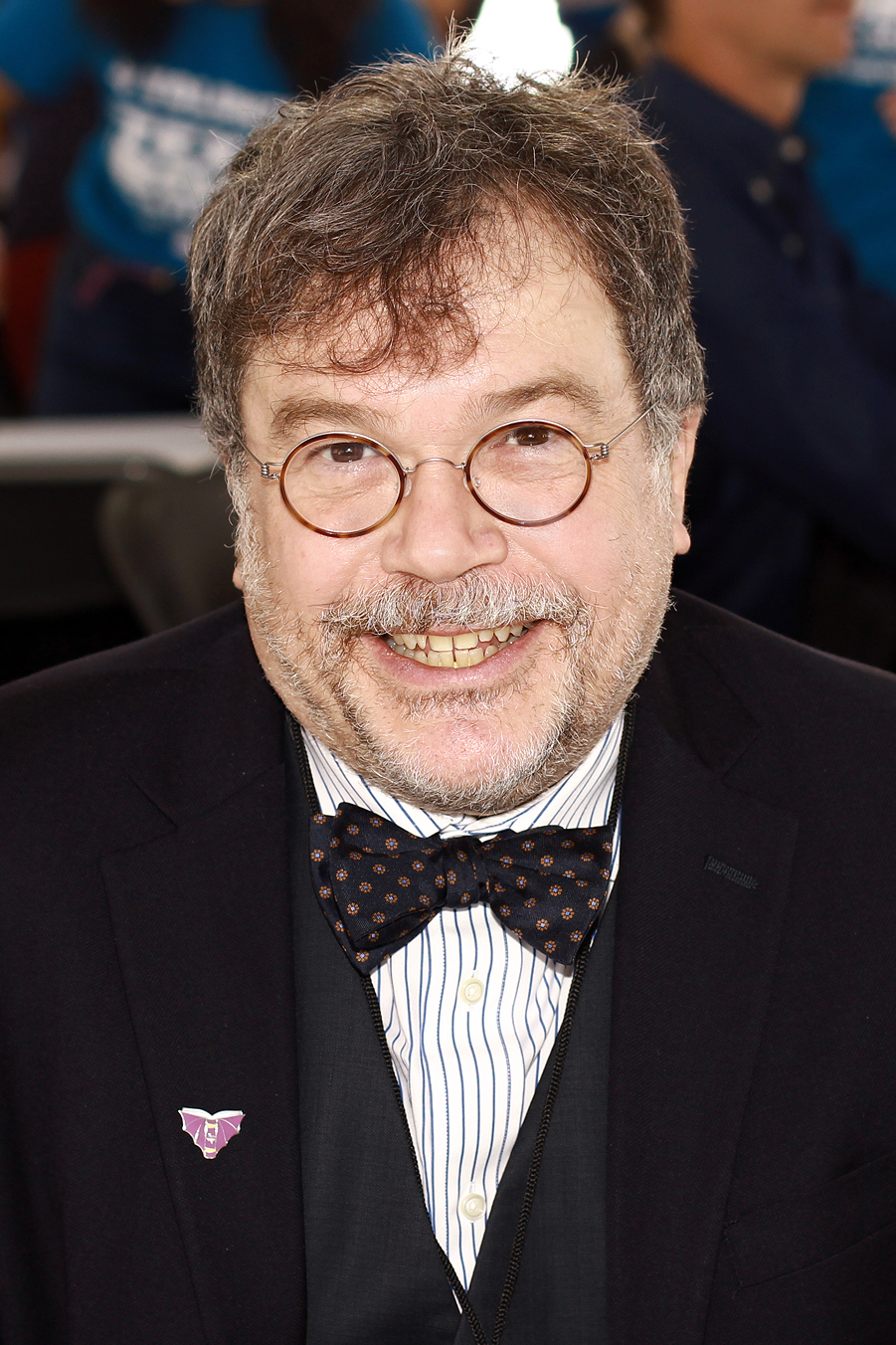
- Hotez in 2019
- Born: Peter Jay Hotez; May 5, 1958 (age 68); Hartford, Connecticut, U.S.
- Education: Yale University (BA); Weill Cornell Medical College (MD); Rockefeller University (PhD)
- Scientific career
- Fields: Vaccinology, neglected tropical disease control, public policy, global health
- Workplaces: George Washington University Medical School; Baylor College of Medicine; Texas Children's Hospital; James Baker Institute; Baylor University

Peter Jay Hotez (born May 5, 1958) is an American scientist, physician, pediatrician, and advocate in the fields of global health, vaccinology, and neglected tropical disease control. At Baylor University, Hotez serves as the founding dean of the National School of Tropical Medicine, as a professor of pediatrics, virology, and microbiology, and as University Professor of Biology. At Texas Children's Hospital, he is the director of the Texas Children's Hospital Center for Vaccine Development and holds its Endowed Chair in Tropical Pediatrics.

Hotez previously served as president of the American Society of Tropical Medicine and Hygiene. He is a founding editor-in-chief of PLOS Neglected Tropical Diseases. Hotez is the co-director of Parasites Without Borders, a global nonprofit organization with a focus on those suffering from parasitic diseases in subtropical environments.

== Early life and education ==
Hotez was born in Hartford, Connecticut. His father Edward J. Hotez was a World War II veteran in the United States Navy.

He grew up in West Hartford and is a graduate of Hall High School. In 1980, he earned a bachelor of arts in molecular biophysics and biochemistry, magna cum laude (Phi Beta Kappa) from Yale University.

In 1986, he was awarded a doctor of philosophy from Rockefeller University. In 1987, he was awarded a doctor of medicine degree from Weill Cornell Medical College. His doctoral dissertation and postdoctoral research were in hookworm molecular pathogenesis and vaccine development.

== Research and career ==
=== Early research ===
Hotez held postdoctoral positions in molecular parasitology and pediatric infectious diseases at Yale University School of Medicine, where he later became an assistant professor in 1992 and an associate professor in 1995. His early research focused on the pathogenesis and molecular mechanisms of human hookworm infection that eventually led to his patented vaccine, which went into clinical trials, as well as a vaccine against schistosomiasis, also researched in clinical trials, either of which could be the first successful vaccine for humans to protect against a multicellular parasite.

=== Neglected tropical diseases ===
Beginning in 2000, Hotez served as a professor and Chair of the Department of Microbiology and Tropical Medicine at the George Washington University. The department was renamed the Department of Microbiology, Immunology, and Tropical Medicine in 2005. He remained in that position until 2011.

Following the issuance of the World Health Organization (WHO) Millennium Development Goals in 2000, Hotez, along with Alan Fenwick and David Molyneux, led a global effort to rename diseases then termed simply "other diseases" as "neglected tropical diseases" (NTDs), and promoted the use of therapeutic and preventive chemotherapy through a combination of drugs entitled the "rapid-impact package". Hotez has advocated for increased efforts to control NTDs since 2005 through publications and speaking engagements, helping to gain increased awareness resulting in a decrease of prevalence and disease burden in many areas.

Hotez led the Sabin Vaccine Institute in Washington, D.C., and helped establish PLOS Neglected Tropical Diseases, the first online open-access medical journal focused exclusively on neglected tropical diseases.

=== Vaccine development ===
In addition to continuing work on vaccines already in clinical trials for hookworm, and schistosomiasis, in 2010, Hotez led a team of researchers developing vaccines against other diseases including leishmaniasis, Chagas disease, SARS, and MERS. As of 2020, he was working in the development of a COVUD-19 vaccine. With Maria Elena Bottazzi, he led the team that designed the Corbevax vaccine.

==== Public dialogue ====
Hotez used his public profile on Twitter and other social media platforms to combat COVID-19 misinformation and vaccine misinformation in general. He appeared as an invited expert on cable and network television news programs, as well as on radio programs. In an interview with the American Medical Association, Hotez noted that communicating clear messages about the ongoing pandemic was of vital importance in an environment that was rife with confusing and misleading messages: "We've been hearing either the sky was falling or there was no problem... the reality is more nuanced than that, and that requires some explanation based on scientific principles."

Hotez has warned that, contrary to popular belief, more young adults than expected would be hospitalized due to the COVID-19 pandemic: "The message is that we've been trying to appeal to younger adults and have them shelter away and do the social distancing and explaining why they're at risk for transmitting the virus to vulnerable populations." In 2020, he warned against optimistic COVID-19 vaccine development timelines, arguing that rushing the scientific process could cause problems, "potentially mak[ing] individuals worse and threaten[ing] vaccine development in the U.S." On August 7, 2020, he said in a television interview that the U.S. can expect to be affected by COVID-19 for "years and years" even after Americans are vaccinated. In that interview, he blamed the federal government for not taking action to contain the spread of the virus.

Like many other public health experts who used social media during the pandemic, Hotez was the target of online harassment. He had already experienced significant prior harassment because of his vaccine advocacy, including at his lectures, receiving online threats, and even being blamed for his daughter's autism.

In June 2023, he tweeted his concerns about Robert F. Kennedy Jr. sharing misinformation about vaccines on the Joe Rogan podcast. Rogan, Kennedy, and Twitter owner Elon Musk asked Hotez to participate in a debate on the podcast. After he declined the invitation, Hotez was harassed by their fans, with anti-vaccine activist Alex Rosen confronting him at his home. At approximately the same time, he had been the subject of attacks by far-right followers of Steve Bannon and Tucker Carlson who separately had denigrated him. In October 2023, he was given the inaugural Anthony Fauci Courage in Leadership Award from the Infectious Diseases Society of America for his efforts in combating anti-science. During an interview in 2026, he discussed his motivations regarding his decision to decline the invitations, particularly his concern that debating Robert F. Kennedy Jr. on the podcast would "legitimize him as a serious presidential candidate".

=== Other activities ===
Hotez issued a proposal entitled "Science Tikkun" in 2025. It addresses bioscience policy, diplomacy, and advocacy in a pandemic framework focused on climate activism, pandemic prevention, vaccine development, neurodiversity research, fighting selective discrimination against scientists for purely personal characteristics, and countering anti-science activities.

== Personal life ==
Hotez is the parent of an autistic daughter. In his 2018 book Vaccines Did Not Cause Rachel's Autism: My Journey As a Vaccine Scientist, Pediatrician, and Autism Dad, he declared that vaccines did not cause the autism his daughter suffers from.

== Awards and memberships ==
Selected awards and memberships include:

- 1999 – Henry Baldwin Ward Medal from the American Society of Parasitologists for outstanding contributions to the field of parasitology.
- 2003 – The Bailey K. Ashford Medal from the American Society of Tropical Medicine and Hygiene for distinguished work in tropical medicine.
- 2017 – The Distinguished Achievement Award from B'nai B'rith International for a lifetime of accomplishments in science and public health.
- 2017 – The Carlos Slim Foundation Health Award.
- 2022 and 2023 – Honorary doctorates from Roanoke College and CUNY School of Public Health.
- 2022 – The American Medical Association Scientific Achievement Award.
- 2023 – The Anthony Fauci Courage in Leadership Award from the Infectious Diseases Society of America.
- 2024 – The Charles-Edward Amory Winslow Metal from the Yale School of Public Health.
- The Villanova University Mendel Medal.
- The Robert P. Balles Prize in Critical Thinking, awarded in 2026 by the Center for Inquiry to Hotez and Michael E. Mann as co-winners.

In 2008, he was elected to membership in the Institute of Medicine of the National Academies. He is an ambassador of the Paul G. Rogers Society for Global Health Research, a Fellow of the American Academy of Pediatrics (FAAP), a member of the World Health Organization Scientific and Technical Advisory Committee for WHO TDR (Special Programme on Tropical Diseases Research), and in 2011, Hotez was appointed as a member of the National Institutes of Health (NIH) Council of Councils.

He is a member of the inaugural class of Fellows of the American Society of Tropical Medicine and Hygiene.

In 2018, Hotez was elected as a member of the American Academy of Arts and Sciences.

Hotez was named in the Time 2024 list of the influential people in health.

== Publications and media ==
=== Scientific reference works ===
Hotez is a co-editor of Krugman's Infectious Diseases of Children, 11th Edition. He is co-editor of Manson's Tropical Diseases, 23rd Edition and Feigin and Cherry's Textbook of Pediatric Infectious Diseases, 7th Edition.

He is the co-author of the reference work entitled, Parasitic Diseases, 5th Edition.

=== Individual works ===
- Forgotten People, Forgotten Diseases: The Neglected Tropical Diseases and Their Impact on Global Health and Development (2008). ISBN 978-1-55581-671-1.
- Blue Marble Health: an Innovative Plan to Fight Diseases of the Poor Amid Wealth (2016). ISBN 978-1-4214-2046-2.
- Vaccines Did Not Cause Rachel's Autism: My Journey As a Vaccine Scientist, Pediatrician, and Autism Dad (2018). ISBN 978-1-4214-2660-0.
- Preventing the Next Pandemic: Vaccine Diplomacy In a Time of Anti-Science (2021). ISBN 978-1-4214-4038-5.
- The Deadly Rise of Anti-science: A Scientist's Warning (2023). ISBN 978-1-4214-4722-3.

=== Co-authored works ===
- (With Michael E. Mann) Science Under Siege: How to Fight the Five Most Powerful Forces that Threaten our World (2025). ISBN 1541705491
