= Maria Elena Bottazzi =

Hondurean microbiologist

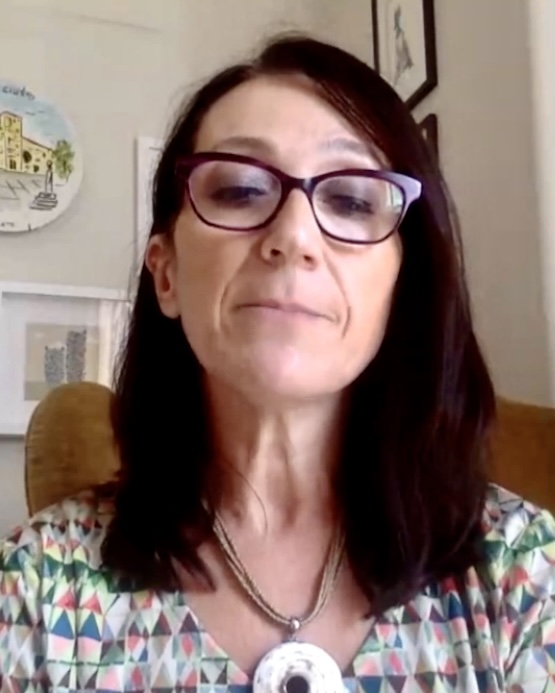
- Education: National Autonomous University of Honduras; University of Florida (PhD)
- Known for: Co-development of Corbevax; Neglected tropical disease research; Open-source vaccine advocacy
- Awards: Great Immigrant Award (2022); National Academy of Medicine (2024); Orden Gran Cruz Placa de Oro (2017)
- Scientific career
- Fields: Microbiology, Vaccinology, Tropical medicine
- Workplaces: Baylor College of Medicine; Baylor University; Texas Children's Hospital
- Website: www.bcm.edu/people-search/maria-bottazzi-18751

Maria Elena Bottazzi is a Honduran-American microbiologist. As of 2024 she is associate dean of the National School of Tropical Medicine at Baylor College of Medicine, as well as Distinguished Professor of Biology at Baylor University, Waco, Texas. She is editor-in-chief of Springer's Current Tropical Medicine Reports. She and Peter Hotez led the team that designed COVID-19 vaccine Corbevax.

== Early life and education ==
The daughter of a Honduran diplomat, Bottazzi was born in Italy. Her family moved back to Honduras when she was 8 years old. She studied microbiology and clinical chemistry as an undergraduate at the National Autonomous University of Honduras (1989), then earned a doctorate in molecular immunology and experimental pathology from the University of Florida in 1995. She completed post-doctoral work in cellular biology at the University of Miami (1998) and the University of Pennsylvania (2001).

== Career ==
Bottazzi is Associate Dean of the National School of Tropical Medicine at Baylor College of Medicine, and Distinguished Professor of Biology at Baylor University, Waco, Texas.

Along with Peter Hotez, Bottazzi runs the Texas Children's Hospital Center for Vaccine Development. The center develops vaccines for neglected tropical diseases and other emerging and infectious diseases. One of these vaccines was a SARS-CoV vaccine that was ready for human trials in 2016, but at the time the team could find no one interested in funding it. With the onset of the COVID-19 pandemic, Bottazzi and Hotez secured funding to develop Corbevax, a COVID-19 vaccine their group offered without taking a licensing fee for the intellectual property, in hopes of lowering costs of vaccination. It also employs recombinant protein technology, used in vaccines since the 1980s (like the Hepatitis B vaccine), with hopes this would be easier for manufacturers to produce than the newer mRNA technology. In December 2021, Corbevax received emergency use authorization from India, which preordered 300 million doses.

She is editor in chief of Springer's Current Tropical Medicine Reports.

== Honors ==
In 2017 Bottazzi received the Orden Gran Cruz Placa de Oro.

In 2022, she was honored with the Carnegie Corporation of New York's Great Immigrant Award. She was elected to the National Academy of Medicine in 2024.

Bittazzi received the 2026 Seeds of Hope Award at the RESULTS Houston Benefit Dinner Novemeber 16th, 2026, for her dedication ensuring that scientific innovation benefits those most often left behind.
