= Pompeyo del Valle =

Honduran poet and journalist (1928–2018)

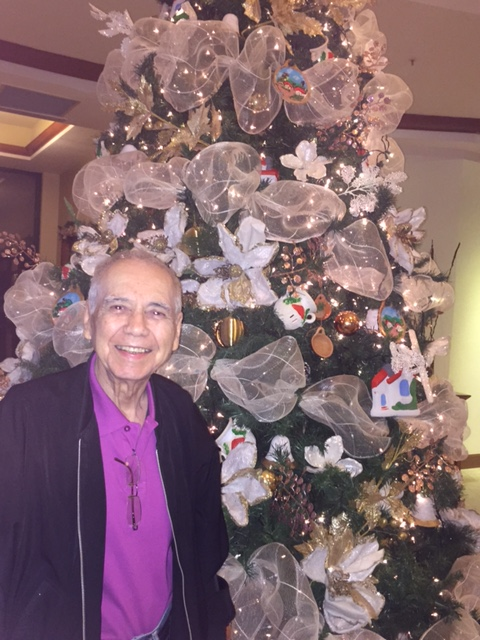
- Pompeyo del Valle. Christmas 2015
- Born: October 26, 1928; Tegucigalpa, Honduras
- Died: August 23, 2018 (aged 89); Comayagua, Honduras
- Occupations: Poet, essayist, story teller, journalist
- Writing career
- Notable works: La Ruta Fulgurante, Retrato de un niño ausente, Nostalgia y belleza del amor

Pompeyo del Valle (October 26, 1928 — August 23, 2018) was a Honduran poet and journalist. De Valle was born in Tegucigalpa, Honduras on October 26, 1928. Son of Carlos del Valle y Soldevilla (from Peru) and Carmen Moncada Rivera, he was born and raised at his maternal grandmother's house in the neighborhood La Ronda, close to the Metropolitan Cathedral and the City Hall. Del Valle made his debut as a journalist in the pages of political newspapers such as, El chilío, Worker's Voice, Alliance of Democratic Youth, among others. After many adventures and misadventures, Del Valle became involved with the drafting of two major national newspapers at the time, El Cronista and El Día. He became Director of the Journal of the National Autonomous University of Honduras.

Simultaneously with his career as a journalist began his career as a poet. Del Valle belongs to the literary generation of the 50.

Among his works are La Ruta Fulgurante (poetry, 1956), Retrato de un Niño Ausente (prose, 1969), Nostalgia y Belleza del Amor (poetry, 1970) and Ciudad con Dragones (poetry, 1980).

Some of his works have been translated into several languages, including English, Chinese, Russian and Ukrainian.

== Biography ==
=== Early life ===
In 1935 he began his elementary studies at the Boys School Francisco Morazán. In 1940 he feels an immense attraction for literature. The film industry helps him endure the hostile reality that anguish him. He reads relentlessly. He attended the National School of Fine Arts. Here he meets David Moya Posas, who will be his fellow literary generation (the 50). In 1944 his mother died at an early age, this event is extremely painful and difficult to the poet Del Valle. Whitman, Neruda, Hikmet, Maples Arce and Spanish poets of the generation of 27 (after many efforts and failures) would help him endure the pain of losing his mother and to find his voice. In 1948 Moya Posas introduces him to Armando Zelaya, Adolfo Alemán and Oscar Acosta, all of them will belong to the literary generation of the 50.

=== Writing career ===
In 1950 Del Valle, lives about two years the Guatemalan revolutionary experience. In 1956 he published his first book (La Ruta Fulgurante) under the pseudonym of Adán Marino. In May 1954 the great strike of the banana workers took place on the north coast of Honduras, Del valle was there, writing in verse and prose, next to the "wretched of the earth".

In 1957 he travelled to USSR, during the VI World Festival of Youth and Students for Peace and Friendship among People held in Moscow from July 28 to August 11. Here he interviewed with the Turkish poet Nâzım Hikmet, one of his favorite writers.

In 1960 he worked as head of the Public Library Camilo Cienfuegos, founded and supported by the Embassy of Cuba in Honduras. He travelled to Havana, where he met the poet Nicolás Guillén; Guillén dedicated an edition of his literary page in the newspaper Hoy to Del Valle. On August 9, Del Valle gave a lecture on "Poetry and the way of life" in the Auditorium of the Cuban National Printing House.

On October 31, 1962, the political police broke into his home as a part of the repressive action of the government of Villeda Morales as a result of the US blockade against the island. In those days he wrote and published his poetry collection El Fugitivo. Lives and works in his own moving underground. Discloses a manifesto addressed to students and young writers.

In 1963 the Honduran police arrested him, forcing him into exile in Mexico and Europe until 1970 when he was repatriated.

In 2005 he participated in the Poetics Ibero-American Summit held in Salamanca, Spain, organized by the foundation Salamanca City of Culture, from the 6 to 8 October.

== Works ==
- La ruta fulgurante (poetry, 1956)
- Antología mínima (poetry, 1958)
- El fugitivo (poetry, 1962)
- Cifra y rumbo de abril (brochure, 1964)
- Retrato de un niño ausente (poetry, 1969)
- Nostalgia y belleza del amor (poetry, 1970)
- Una Elfina
- El hondureño hombre mítico (prose, 1977)
- Ciudad con dragones (poetry, 1980)
- Los hombres verdes de ula (stories, 1982)
- Duración de lo eterno (poetry, 1989)
- Poemas selectos (poetry, 1989)
- Una escama de oro y otra de plata (traditions, 1989)
- El encantado vino del otoño (poetry, 2002)
- Comer y beber en Honduras (ensayo, 2002)
- Piano de cola en el mar (poetry, 2006)
- La imaginaria línea del horizonte (poetry, 2010)
- Recado para un mirlo blanco (autobiography, 2012)

== Awards ==
Some of the awards given to Del Valle are listed below:

- 1978: Premio Ramón Amaya Amador conferido por la Alcaldía Municipal de Tegucigalpa.
- 1978: Premio IV Centenario de la Fundación de Tegucigalpa, conferido por el Consejo Metropolitano del Distrito Central por su poemario Ciudad con dragones.
- 1980: Premio de narrativa por su libro Los Hombres verdes de ula conferido por la Universidad Nacional Autónoma de Honduras
- 1981: Ramón Rosa National Literature Award from the government of Honduras.
- 1989: Hoja de laurel de oro conferido por el Ministerio de Cultura, Artes y Deportes.
- Premio de Literatura José Trinidad Reyes conferido por la Universidad Nacional Autónoma de Honduras.
