= Rigoberto Paredes =

Honduran poet, essayist and publisher

- Born: 26 April 1948; Santa Bárbara, Honduras
- Died: 9 March 2015 (aged 66); Tegucigalpa, Honduras
- Occupations: Poet, essayist and publisher
- Years active: 1974–2015
- Spouse: Anarella Vélez
- Awards: Ramón Rosa National Literature Award (2006)

Rigoberto Paredes (26 April 1948 – 9 March 2015) was a Honduran poet, essayist and publisher. He was the founder of Editorial Guaymuras, Editores Unidos and Ediciones Librería Paraíso. Among his works were En el Lugar de los hechos (1974); Las cosas por su nombre (1978); Materia prima (1985); Fuego lento (1989); La estación perdida (2001).

He received the Ramón Rosa National Literature Award in 2006.

== Private life ==
He was married to the poet and historian Anarella Vélez. She became the Secretary of State for Culture, Arts and Sports in Xiomara Castro's government in 2022.
