= Dante Mossi =

Honduran economist, international civil servant and diplomat

Dante Mossi Reyes
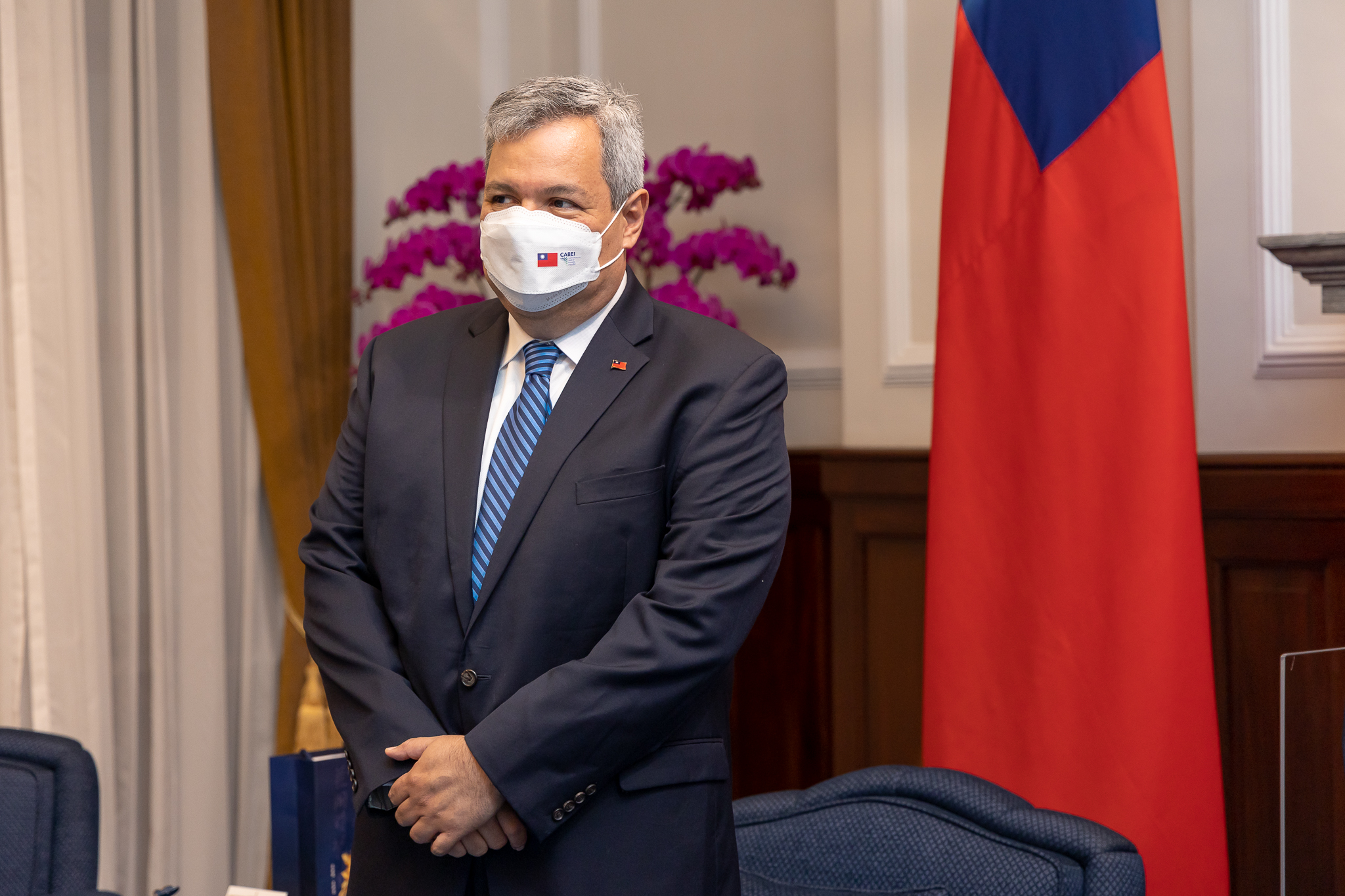
- Mossi in 2022

Executive President; Central American Bank for Economic Integration
- In office 1 December 2018 – 30 November 2023
- Preceded by: Nick Rischbieth
- Succeeded by: Gisela Sánchez

Personal details
- Born: Tegucigalpa, Honduras
- Education: National Autonomous University of Honduras (BASc); Duke University (M.A.); Vanderbilt University (Ph.D.)

Dante Mossi Reyes is a Honduran economist, international civil servant and diplomat, who served as the Executive President of the Central American Bank for Economic Integration (CABEI) from 2018 to 2023. Prior to this chief executive role, he worked at the World Bank for many years in a variety of senior roles.

== Biography ==
A native of Tegucigalpa, Honduras, Dante Mossi Reyes received a Bachelor of Applied Science degree in electrical engineering in 1989, from the National Autonomous University of Honduras. As the best graduating student in his year, he won the gold medal. He attended a short training program in economics at San Diego State University in 1990. He was a recipient of the LASPAU fellowship and in 1991, he earned an M.A. in economics, specializing in econometrics at Duke University. In 1996, Mossi was awarded a PhD in economics with a concentration in public finance at the Vanderbilt University, where he wrote his dissertation on optimal taxation and informal markets.

In his early decade-long career in public service, he was a government bureaucrat in Honduras, where he was the chief economist of the Secretariat of the Presidency and as Secretary of the Economic Cabinet between 2002 and 2003. He was also a consultant in the private sector and taught economics at the Catholic University of Honduras. From 1998 to 2002, he was the Secretary Commissioner at the Honduran National Telecommunications Commission.

In his 15-year international development career at the World Bank, he worked in country offices in Honduras, Ghana, Paraguay and at the headquarters in Washington, DC. He joined the World Bank in 2003 and was the country economist at the World Bank office in Honduras until 2006. He was elevated to the position of Chief of Operations in Tegucigalpa until 2010. As the country operations officer in Accra, Ghana, he coordinated various project portfolios, assistance strategy and innovations in municipal public-private partnerships. He became the World Bank’s resident representative in Asuncion, Paraguay in 2013 and coordinated project programs and technical assistance, improving dialogue with other multilateral agencies within the World Bank Group such as the IFC and MIGA. From 2016 to 2018, Mossi was the Senior Operations Officer in the Global Energy Practice - Africa in Washington, DC.

In 2018, the board of directors of the Central American Bank for Economic Integration (CABEI) appointed and confirmed Dante Mossi as the Executive President, in effect the chief executive officer of the multilateral agency. His term ended in December 2023 after the institution declined to renew his tenure. He is fluent in English and Spanish.

In 2024, Mossi sued CABEI over a deduction, while the Bank countersued "for violations of the Racketeering Influenced and Corrupt Organizations Act (“RICO”), breach of fiduciary duty, market manipulation, tortious interference, and breach of contract".
