= Academia Hondureña de la Lengua =

Coordinates: 14°06′32″N 87°12′17″W

The Academia Hondureña de la Lengua (Spanish for Honduran Academy of Language) is an association of academics and experts on the use of the Spanish language in Honduras. It was founded in Tegucigalpa on December 28, 1948. It is a member of the Association of Spanish Language Academies.

== History ==
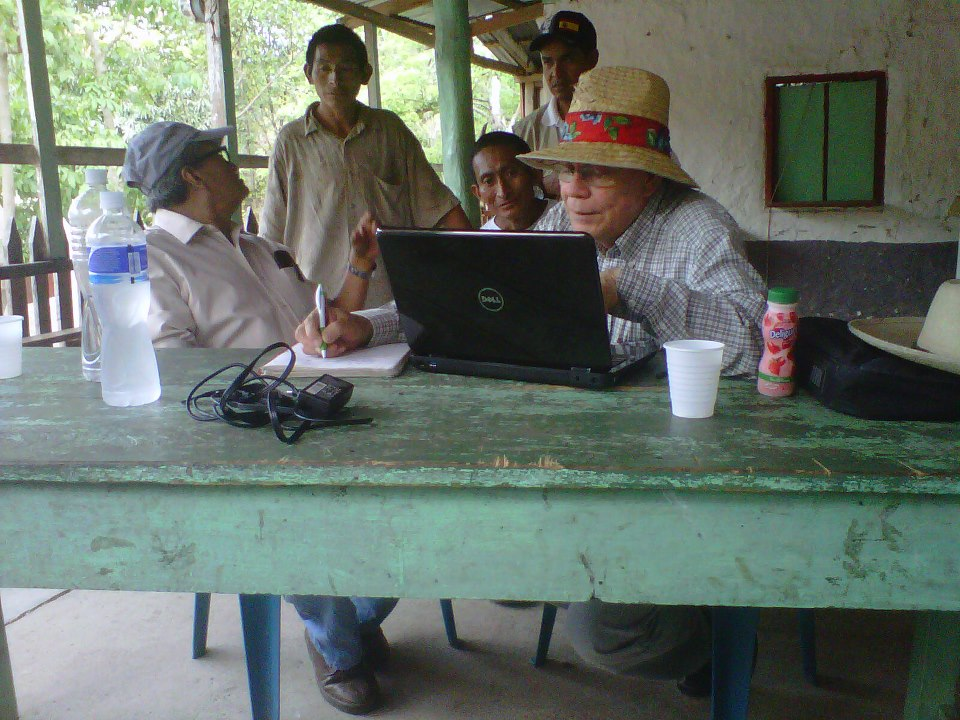
The poet and linguist Víctor Manuel Ramos validating the Diccionario de las Lenguas de Honduras with members of the Tolupan ethnic group.

The academy is the successor of Honduras' 19th-century Scientific-Literary Academy. It had a dozen founding members, with Esteban Guardiola serving as founding director. The opening session was attended by Manuel Aznar Zubigaray, a Spanish diplomat who was in the country to attend the inauguration of President Juan Manuel Gálvez a few days later.

The Academia Hondureña de la Lengua has been recognized for its dynamism in the face of difficult circumstances, including the destruction of the organization's building and its treasured library during Hurricane Mitch in 1998. Efforts are ongoing to rebuild the organization's library collection, whose maintenance is part of its stated mission.

The Royal Spanish Academy's 400th-anniversary commemorative edition of Don Quixote by Miguel de Cervantes, which was jointly produced by 22 Spanish-language academies around the world, was initially proposed by the Honduran academy. As the organization's president at the time, Óscar Acosta, wrote, "I proposed printing Quixote in a dignified format and in a wallet-friendly edition accessible to all, including those in Latin American nations with devalued currencies, an idea that was approved by unanimous consent."

In the 22nd edition of the Royal Spanish Academy's dictionary, published in 2001, the Academia Hondureña de la Lengua made a significant contribution to the world of the Spanish language: 1,950 Honduran words were added to the reference book. In the previous edition, in 1992, only 302 had been registered. The over 2,000 total Honduran words, including 400 Honduran demonyms, made Honduran Spanish one of the most significant contributors of new lexical elements to this new edition of the dictionary.

In 1957, with the signing of the Treaty of Cultural Exchange between Spain and Honduras, both governments swore to "offer each other support ... especially to their respective Academies of Language." And since 1960, with the ratification in Colombia of the Multilateral Convention on the Association of Academies of the Spanish Language, the organization has the full backing of the Honduran government, as the convention states: "Each of the signatory governments swears to lend moral and economic support to its respective national Academy of the Spanish Language."

At the end of 2011, amid the situation of threats and attacks on Honduran media outlets and "the irrational escalation of violence that has ended the lives of journalists and brave Hondurans," the academy issued a public pronouncement "in favor of freedom of expression and tolerance." To achieve the organization's mission of defending and enriching the Spanish language, they wrote, "the free circulation and expression of ideas is essential."

== Academy members ==
The academy has included many important Honduran literary and academic figures, including Eufemiano Claros, Augusto Monterroso, Eliseo Pérez Cadalso, Jorge Fidel Durón, Manuel Salinas Paguada and Leticia de Oyuela.

== See also ==
- List of colloquial expressions in Honduras
- Association of Academies of the Spanish Language
- Royal Spanish Academy
