= María Cristina Pineda Suazo =

María Cristina Pineda Suazo (1954) is a Honduran astronomer, physicist, civil engineer, professor, and scientific investigator. She was Director of the Astronomical Research Center (CEACS-UNAH), and currently serves as dean in the Faculty of Spatial Sciences (FACES) at the Universidad Nacional Autónoma de Honduras. She belongs to several scientific organizations, including the International Astronomical Union (IAU), the Asamblea de Astrónomos de América Central (AAAC), and the Fundación Salvador Moncada para el Avance de la Ciencia. Pineda also serves as President of the National Committee for Astronomy in Honduras.

== Selected works ==
- María Cristina Pineda de Carías. “Una Década de Astronomía Centroamericana en Honduras.” Artículo en Mensaje al Futuro. Observatorio Astronómico Centroamericano de Suyapa, Universidad Nacional Autónoma de Honduras. Diciembre, 2000.
- María Cristina Pineda de Carías, The Central America Master's Program in Astronomy and Astrophysics. Capítulo libro Astronomy for Developing Countries, IAU Special Session at the 24th General Assembly, 2001. Alan H. Batten, ed. Astronomical Society of the Pacific. Michigan, U.S.A. 2001. (Páginas: 69–79).
- María Cristina Pineda de Carías, Vito Véliz y Ricardo Agurcia Fasquelle. “Del grande y complejo plan de 18 Conejo para la Plaza del Sol del Parque Arqueológico de Copán Ruinas. Artículo en Revista del Instituto Hondureño de Antropología e Historia. Edición Conmemorativa 50 Aniversario: 1952-2002. Instituto Hondureño de Antropología e Historia. Tegucigalpa, Honduras. 2002. (páginas: 126-134).
- María Cristina Pineda de Carías, Vito Véliz y Ricardo Agurcia Fasquelle. ”Estela D: Reloj Solar de la Plaza del Sol del Parque Arqueológico de Copán Ruinas, Honduras. Artículo en Revista Yaxkin. Instituto Hondureño de Antropología e Historia. Año 34, Vol. XXV, No.2. 2009. (páginas: 111-138).
- María Cristina Pineda de Carías. ”Base de datos de eventos solares observados desde la Plaza del Sol del Parque Arqueológico de Copán Ruinas.” Artículo en Revista Ciencia y Tecnología. Dirección de Investigación Científica, UNAH. Número 4 (ISSN_ 1995–9613). Tegucigalpa, Honduras. 2009. (páginas: 20–35).
- María Cristina Pineda de Carías. ¿Qué es el Observatorio Astronómico Centroamericano de Suyapa de la Universidad Nacional Autónoma de Honduras? Artículo en Revista Ciencias Espaciales, Facultad de Ciencias Espaciales, UNAH. Número 1, Vol. 2 (ISSN 2225-5249). 2009. (páginas: 128–144).
- Liliam Sofía Gómez y María Cristina Pineda de Carías. “Atlas Multimedia Prototipo del Centro Histórico del Distrito Central de Honduras.” Artículo en Revista de Postgrados de la UNAH (ISSN 2071-8470). Tegucigalpa, MDC, Honduras. 2010. (páginas 185–196).
- Joaquín Bosque Sendra y María Cristina Pineda de Carías. “I Congreso Internacional de Ordenamiento Territorial y Tecnologías de la Información Geográfica. Resúmenes y Comunicaciones.” Universidad de Alclalá, Alcalá de Henares, Madrid, España. Impreso en España. 2010. ISBN 978-84-8138-886-2.
- María Cristina Pineda de Carías. “International Year of Astronomy 2009 – Final Report. Capítulo: Honduras.” Editado por: Pedro Russo y Lars Lindberg Christensen. International Astronomical Union. 2010. Páginas 666–676.
- Equipo Interinstitucional: UNAH/Facultad de Ciencias Espaciales:María Cristina Pineda de Carías, Gerardo Enrique Inestroza Euceda, Omri Alberto Amaya Carías; UNAH/Dirección Vinculación Universidad Sociedad/Educación No Formal: Alex Geovanni Matamoros Castro; Dirección General de Aeronáutica Civil: Heriberto Sierra Pavón; Asociación para el Desarrollo Aeronáutico y Educativo de Honduras: Pavel Andrey Espinal Ponce, Gorki Engels Alfaro. Bases para el establecimiento de las Ciencias Aeronáuticas en la Facultad de Ciencias Espaciales de la Universidad Nacional Autónoma de Honduras. Tegucigalpa MDC, Honduras. Diciembre, 2012. ISBN 978-99926-96-74-3.
- María Cristina Pineda de Carías, Vilma Lorena Ochoa y Rafael Enrique Corrales. Artículo: “Detección de cambios en la cobertura de la tierra de un sector del occidente de Honduras, Período 1991-2006.” Revista Ciencia y Tecnología, Dirección de Investigación Científica de la Universidad Nacional Autónoma de Honduras. Número 11, Diciembre 2012. (páginas. 78–109)
- María Cristina Pineda de Carías, Eduardo L. Moreno Segura, Vilma Lorena Ochoa. “XIV Conferencia Iberoamericana de Sistemas de Información Geográfica. Resúmenes de Conferencias y Comunicaciones. Universidad Nacional Autónoma de Honduras/Facultad de Ciencias Espaciales (FAES), Sociedad Iberoamericana de Sistemas de Información Geográfica.” Tegucigalpa, M.D.C. Honduras. Julio 2013. ISBN 978-99926-96-59-0.
