= Rafael Casco =

Rafael Casco is a surrealist style artist, born in Tegucigalpa, Honduras. In 1990 he received a degree as an art teacher from the National School of Fine Arts in Honduras and studied psychology at the National Autonomous University of Honduras. For many years he worked teaching art, English while all the time painting. He then went on to help children living on the street working as an Art Therapist at the Covenant House in Honduras. This work is what brought him to the United States and he worked as a volunteer teaching art to at risk children and adults with the YWCA in San Jose, California.

Since arriving in the United States, he has received multiple grants working for the Cento Hispano of East Tennessee teaching children to make intro cultural masks. For the past two years he works with the Tennessee Art Commission and Hola Hora Latina of Knoxville to collect and record culture, traditions and customs of people living in East Tennessee. He has also worked with the Tennessee Art Commission serving as a panelist for the Community Learning Committee reviewing and evaluating grant applications.

Throughout the years he has continued to paint his surrealist style paintings. He works as an Artist on Location with the Knoxville Museum of Art. In 2010 he received an Artist in Residency from the Tennessee Art and Cultural Alliance. The Following year he won an Award of Merit, for his piece Tree of Life at the Sevier County Biennial Exhibition at Arrowmont School of Arts and Crafts. In 2011 he was selected by Arrowmont School to participate with select artists to exhibit at the Sevier County Invitational. In that same year he was awarded an Honorable Mention for his painting the Book of Law at the Tennessee Art Association Juried Exhibition.
