= Biological E. Limited =

Indian biopharmaceutical company

Biological E Limited
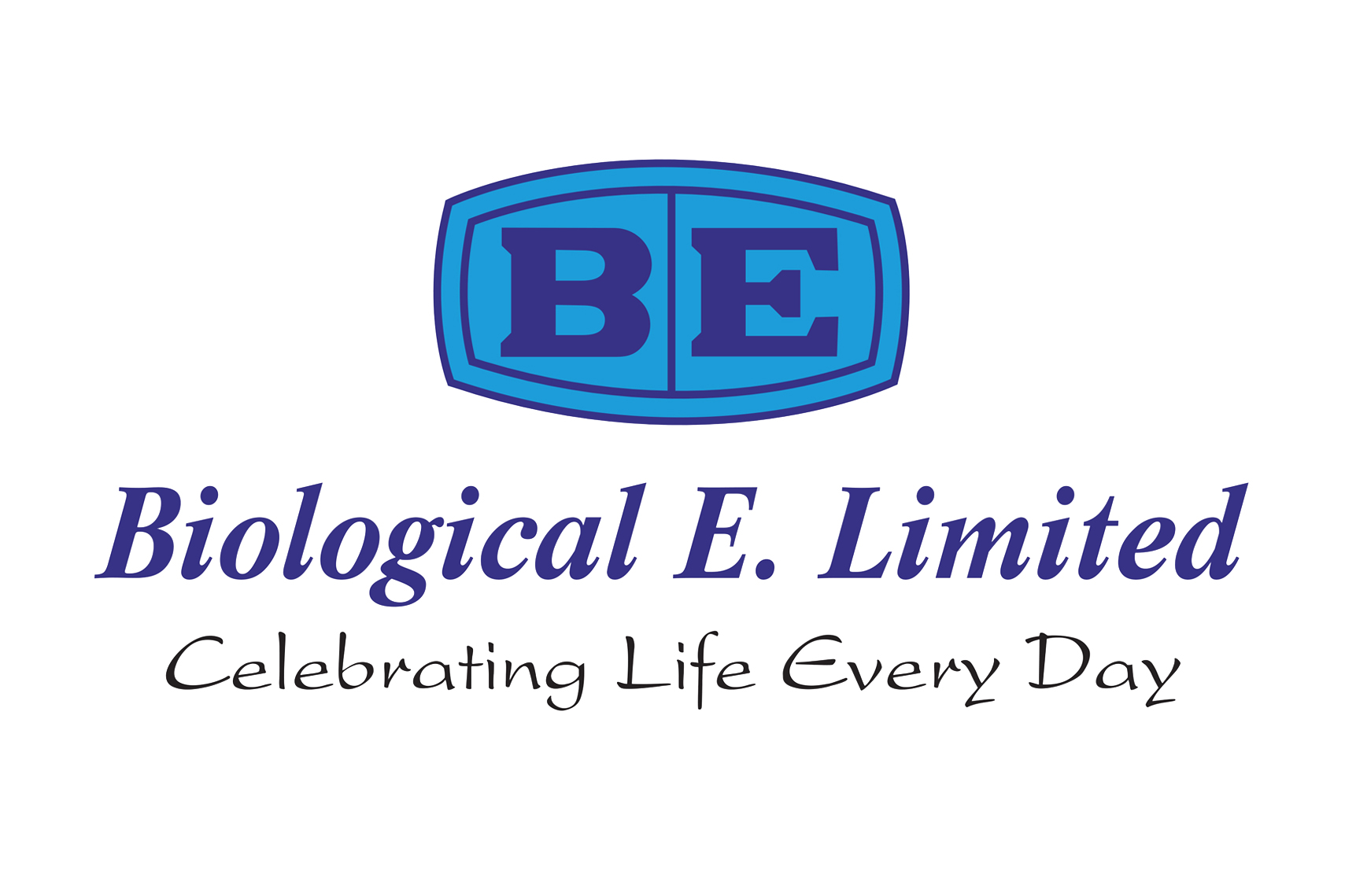
- Type: Private
- Industry: Biotechnology, Biopharmaceuticals
- Founded: 1953; 73 years ago
- Founder: Datla Venkata Krishnam Raju
- Headquarters: Jubilee Hills, Hyderabad, Telangana, India
- Key people: Mahima Datla (CEO and Managing Director)
- Revenue: ▲₹3,820 crore (US$400 million) (FY23)
- Net income: ▲₹953 crore (US$99 million) (FY23)
- Number of employees: 2,500
- Website: www.biologicale.com

Biological E Limited is an Indian biotechnology and biopharmaceutical company based in Hyderabad, Telangana. It specialises in the areas of low-cost vaccine production.

== History ==
The company was founded by Dr. D.V.K. Raju and Mr. G.A.N. Raju in 1953 as Biological Products Private Limited. It was among the first private sector companies in India to manufacture biological products. It pioneered Heparin production in India.

In 1964, Evans Medicals, a U.K. based Pharma Company, which later got merged with Glaxo SmithKline acquired 40% stake in the company, which was subsequently bought back by the promoters in 1995.

During the 1960s and 70s, Biological E developed formulations in cough and digestive enzymes, started manufacturing anti-tetanus serum, and launched anti-TB drugs, TT and DTP vaccines.

Biological E embarked specialise in low-cost vaccines manufacturing. The company started manufacturing its flagship vaccine product, Pentavalent (DTP Hib HepB) in 2008. Biological E is a major supplier of vaccines to international development and aid organisations such as WHO, UNICEF, BMGF.

== COVID-19 vaccine development ==
During the COVID-19 pandemic, the company signed a pact with Baylor College of Medicine, Texas Children's Hospital and Dynavax Technologies to develop a COVID-19 vaccine. The vaccine Corbevax. Bio E COVID-19 was expected to roll out in 2021 with 75 to 80 million doses manufactured per month; the production was expected to reach 1 billion doses by the end of 2022 under the Quad initiative.

In August 2020, the company signed a deal with Johnson & Johnson to manufacture the latter's vaccine candidate at its Hyderabad facility. In February 2021, it announced that it would produce over 600 million doses of the single-dose Janssen vaccine annually.
