= Marco Tulio Medina =

Honduran neurologist

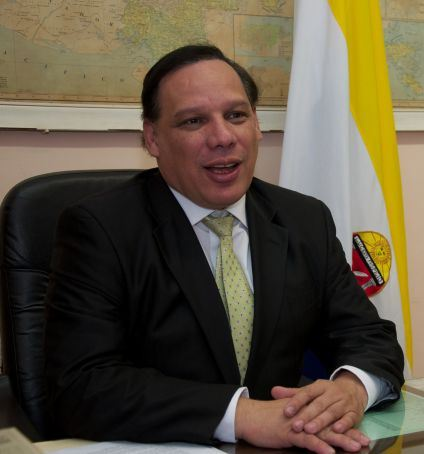
Marco Tulio Medina

Marco Tulio Medina (born September 19, 1959, in Tegucigalpa) is a Honduran neurologist and scientist. He currently serves as ex Dean of the Faculty of Medical Sciences at Universidad Nacional Autónoma de Honduras in Tegucigalpa, where he has promoted neurological research in Honduras.

Medina began his research activities in the Department of Science at the Universidad Nacional Autónoma de Honduras in 1985, and was head of the Scientific Research Unit. Together with various professors of the Faculty of Medical Sciences, and scientists, he established the Institute for Research in Health Sciences, the first of its kind in Honduras. Since the early 1990s he has studied epilepsy genes, and along with Professor Antonio Delgado Escueta of the University of California, Los Angeles, and has co-discovered several genes related to epilepsy, including EFHC1 and GABRB3.

He became the regional director for Latin America of the World Federation of Neurology, and head of the Latin American Committee of the International League Against Epilepsy. He is also an expert consultant to the World Health Organization for the International Classification of Diseases. In 2000 he was one of the founders of the Global Honduras Foundation (Fundación Honduras Global), which aims to identify and connect Honduran people worldwide and promote knowledge by encouraging innovation and scientific development in Honduras. He was also co-founder of the Honduran Association of General Practitioners (Asociación Hondureña de Médicos Generales), the Honduran Society of Epilepsy (Sociedad Hondureña de Epilepsia), Honduran Association of Neurology (Asociación Hondureña de Neurología) and numerous others. In 2013 he was awarded the José Cecilio del Valle National Prize for Science by the Ministry of Education.
