= Anarella Vélez =

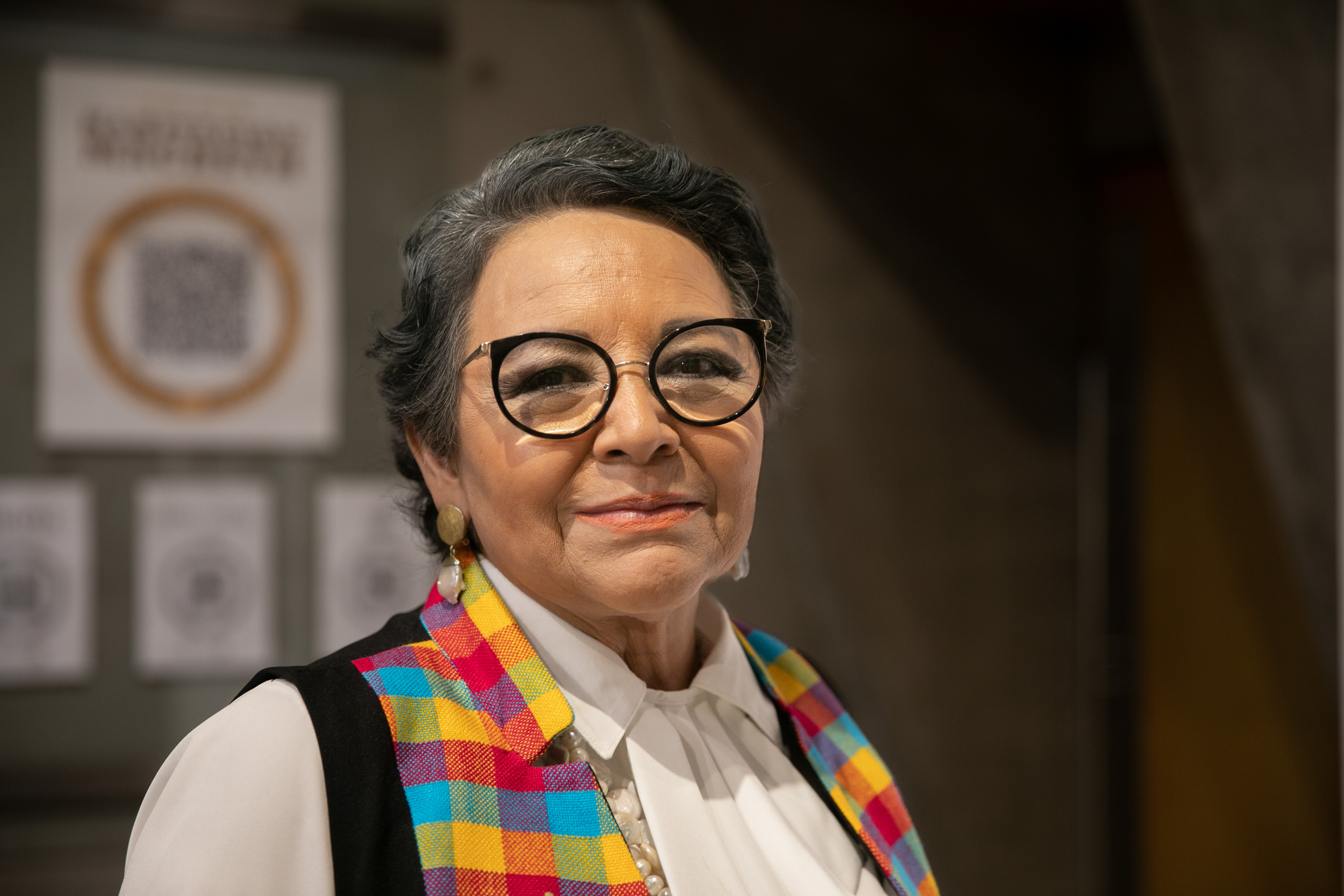
- Born: 1956 (age 69–70); Tegucigalpa, Honduras
- Occupations: Politician, poet, minister
- Spouse: Rigoberto Paredes

Anarella Vélez Osejo (born 1956) is a Honduran academic, historian and writer. She has published over twenty books. In 2022 she became the Secretary of State for Culture, Arts and Sports.

== Life ==
Vélez was born in 1956 in Tegucigalpa. Vélez planned to professionally follow the footsteps her parents, Sergio Vélez and Gloria Osejo, a gynaecologist and an obstetrician. However her interest turned to history and she traveled to Argentina to study at the National University of La Plata though she ended up graduating the National Autonomous University of Honduras. Vélez completed her education in Spain, where she gained a master's degree in history at the Autonomous University of Barcelona.

Vélez became a Professor of Art History at the Universidad Nacional Autónoma de Honduras. and published over twenty books. Her husband, a noted poet, died in 2015.

Art and culture were said to have been neglected during the government of Juan Orlando Hernández, downgraded from a full ministry. However, in 2022, Vélez became a member of the cabinet when she accepted the position of the Secretary of State for Culture, Arts and Sports in Xiomara Castro's government.

Vélez complained that the previous administration spent all of its small budget on salaries. According to her, Vehicles, buildings and even paintings were unmaintained. She announced, "We have cracked the patriarchal culture".

In 2025, Vélez was awarding the inaugural national awards for art and culture at the Museum for National Identity. She was also recognizing leading artists, which she described as her duty.

== Publications include ==
- Todas las voces (lit. "All Voices"), 2013;
- Iluminadas (lit. "Illuminated"), 2016;
- Columna de fuego (lit. "Column of Fire"), 2018
- Once de Noviembre (lit. "11 November"), 2021.
