= Julio Escoto =

Honduran short-story teller, novelist and essayist

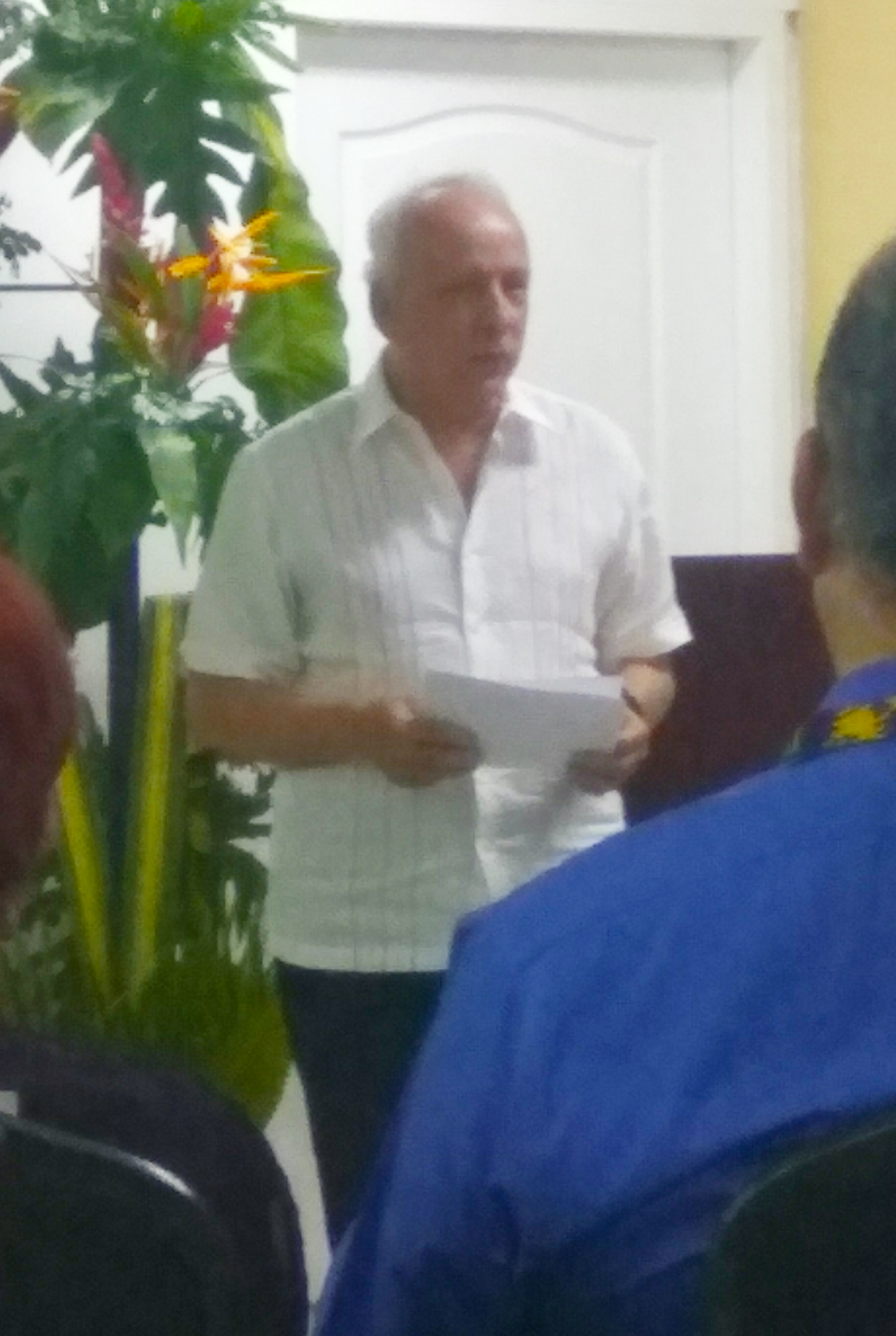
- Born: February 28, 1944 (age 82); San Pedro Sula, Cortés, Honduras
- Education: University of Florida; University of Costa Rica
- Occupations: short-story writer; novelist; essayist; literary critic; editor; cultural manager
- Writing career
- Language: Spanish
- Genres: Fiction; short story; essay
- Notable works: El árbol de los pañuelos; Días de ventisca, noches de huracán; Rey del albor, Madrugada; El génesis en Santa Cariba; Downtown Paraíso
- Notable awards: Ramón Rosa National Literature Award (1975); Ramón Amaya Amador Prize (2019)

Julio Escoto (born February 28, 1944, in San Pedro Sula) is a Honduran short-story teller, novelist and essayist. Notable novels include El Arbol de los Panuelos, Días de Ventisca, Noches de Huracán, El General Morazán marcha a batallar desde la Muerte, Rey del Albor. Madrugada, and the last published (2007) El Génesis en Santa Cariba.

== Early life and education ==
Escoto was born in San Pedro Sula, Cortés, on 28 February 1944. In 1964, he graduated as a teacher specializing in letters from the Escuela Superior del Profesorado in Tegucigalpa. He later earned a degree in university education from the University of Florida in 1970 and a master's degree in Hispano-American literature from the University of Costa Rica in 1984.

== Career ==
Escoto worked as a teacher in Tegucigalpa before taking cultural and editorial posts in Central America. From 1976 to 1977, he directed the Central American Cultural Affairs Program of the Consejo Superior Universitario Centroamericano, and from 1977 to 1980 he directed EDUCA, the publishing arm of that organization. After returning to Honduras in 1986, he taught in the letters program at the National Autonomous University of Honduras. His later institutional work included posts connected with literary editing, communications and rural-development publishing, including the literary magazine Imaginación, the Centro Editor in San Pedro Sula, the FHIA communications unit, and the journal Desarrollo Rural de las Américas.

Escoto has been a columnist for El Heraldo and director of the library at the National Autonomous University of Honduras in the Sula Valley.

In September 2023, the Central Bank of Honduras announced that President Xiomara Castro had appointed Escoto to the bank's board of directors.

== Literary career ==
Escoto began publishing fiction in the 1960s. His first book, Los Guerreros de Hibueras, appeared in 1967, followed by La balada del herido pájaro y otros cuentos in 1969 and El árbol de los pañuelos in 1972. His work has included novels, short stories and essays, and he has also worked as an editor and cultural manager.

El árbol de los pañuelos has been discussed in relation to Ramón Amaya Amador's novel Los brujos de Ilamatepeque, with Escoto's narrative set after the events associated with the Cano brothers. The novel uses non-linear narration, interior monologue, intertextuality and ambiguity between dreamlike and realistic elements.

Escoto has said that his early books were more closely connected with imagination, myth and legend, while his later works incorporated more research and focused more strongly on modern Honduran history. His later publications include Rey del albor, Madrugada, Magos mayas monjes Copán and Downtown Paraíso.

== Recognition and public activity ==
Escoto received the Ramón Rosa National Prize for Literature in 1975. He received the Ramón Amaya Amador Prize in 2019. In May 2026, the first Festival Internacional de Literatura en el Atlántico opened in San Pedro Sula with a tribute to Escoto at the Museo de Antropología e Historia. During the event, Escoto described reading and books as a means of strengthening cultural ties among Central American peoples and emphasized the importance of renewing young readers' interest in the written word.

== Bibliography ==
- Los Guerreros de Hibueras (1967).
- La balada del herido pájaro y otros cuentos (1969).
- El árbol de los pañuelos (1972).
- Antología de la poesía amorosa en Honduras (1975).
- Casa del agua (1975).
- Días de ventisca, noches de huracán (1980).
- El ojo santo: la ideología en las religiones y la televisión (1990).
- José Cecilio del Valle: una ética contemporánea (1990).
- Todos los cuentos (1990).
- Rey del albor, Madrugada (1993).
- El génesis en Santa Cariba (2007).
- Magos mayas monjes Copán (2009).
- Downtown Paraíso (2018).
- Casa del Aire.
