= Indira Murillo =

Honduran journalist and basketball player (1969–2019)

Indira Davelba Murillo Alvarado (Tegucigalpa, April 7, 1969–Virginia, January 5, 2019) was an Honduran-American journalist, television producer, former basketball player and philanthropist. Founder of TN5, the Spanish Information Network of Virginia (Sinova), and of the Fundación Amor.

== Early life and education ==
She was born in Tegucigalpa, where she lived in the El Bosque neighborhood, along with her parents Alfredo Murillo and Norma Alvarado, and was the youngest of eight siblings. She attended primary school at the Escuela 14 de Julio, and her secondary studies at the Instituto Alfonso Guillén Zelaya, where at the same time she had a basketball school called "Indi del Bosque", where she taught the children of the neighborhood to play basketball. Murillo graduated with a degree in journalism from the Universidad Nacional Autónoma de Honduras, and also obtained a master's degree in demography and development.

== Basketball career ==
As a basketball player, she was part of the Honduran women's basketball team, along with her sister, Norma Murillo. In the National Team, Murillo represented Honduras in several international basketball competitions, including the fourth edition of the Central American Games and an international competition held in Nicaragua in 1987. She subsequently became a trainer of the Women's Basketball Team of Honduras.

Murillo played for four different teams in Honduras until her retirement in the 90s.

Team	Country
Instituto Tegucigalpa	Honduras
Ràpido	Honduras
Motagua	Honduras
Nacional de Ingenieros	Honduras

== Journalist career ==
As a journalist, Murillo began her career working for Radio Cadena de Noticias, and later for Televicentro, where she worked as a reporter and news anchor, and also founded the TN5 newscast. Later, Murillo worked for the Inter-American Development Bank as a producer and developer of reports and research. Finally she worked for Telemundo.

== Philanthropy ==
In 2005, Murillo founded the Fundación Amor with her family, a non-profit foundation that benefits orphaned children and women with HIV.

In 2009, she founded the Spanish Information Network of Virginia (Sinova), a non-profit organization to inform the Latino community of Virginia about news, give advice on the migration process to the United States for free among other services. Murillo was the president until her death in 2019.

== Personal life ==
She obtained the American nationality during her residence in that country. In 2014, she married Omar Nava, originally from Bolivia.

== Death ==
Murillo died on January 5, 2019, in the state of Virginia, at the age of 49. She had liver cancer.

== Awards and honours ==
- She received the Prize for solidarity in 2014 from the Inter-American Development Bank for her altruistic work.
- She received an award from Unicef for a story about the Montaña de la Flor.
- She received a prize for part of the EFE, for its audiovisual production "The hope of despair", about a family affected by Hurricane Mitch.
