= Abraham Kafati Díaz =

Honduran politician

- Born: April 27, 1948 (age 78)
- Occupation: Mayor of Danlí
- Known for: Deputy in the National Congress of Honduras

Abraham Kafati Díaz (born 27 April 1948) is a Honduran businessman and politician. He served as deputy of the National Congress of Honduras from 2008-2012, representing the National Party of Honduras for the department of El Paraíso. He currently serves as mayor of the city and municipality of Danlí, having won reelection in 2026, making history in the process as the first mayor of the city to win reelection.

Díaz is one of 6 deputies returned from El Paraíso, and was elected with 13.28% of the overall vote for the department.
