= Fernando Palma =

Honduran diplomat, model, actor (born 1993)

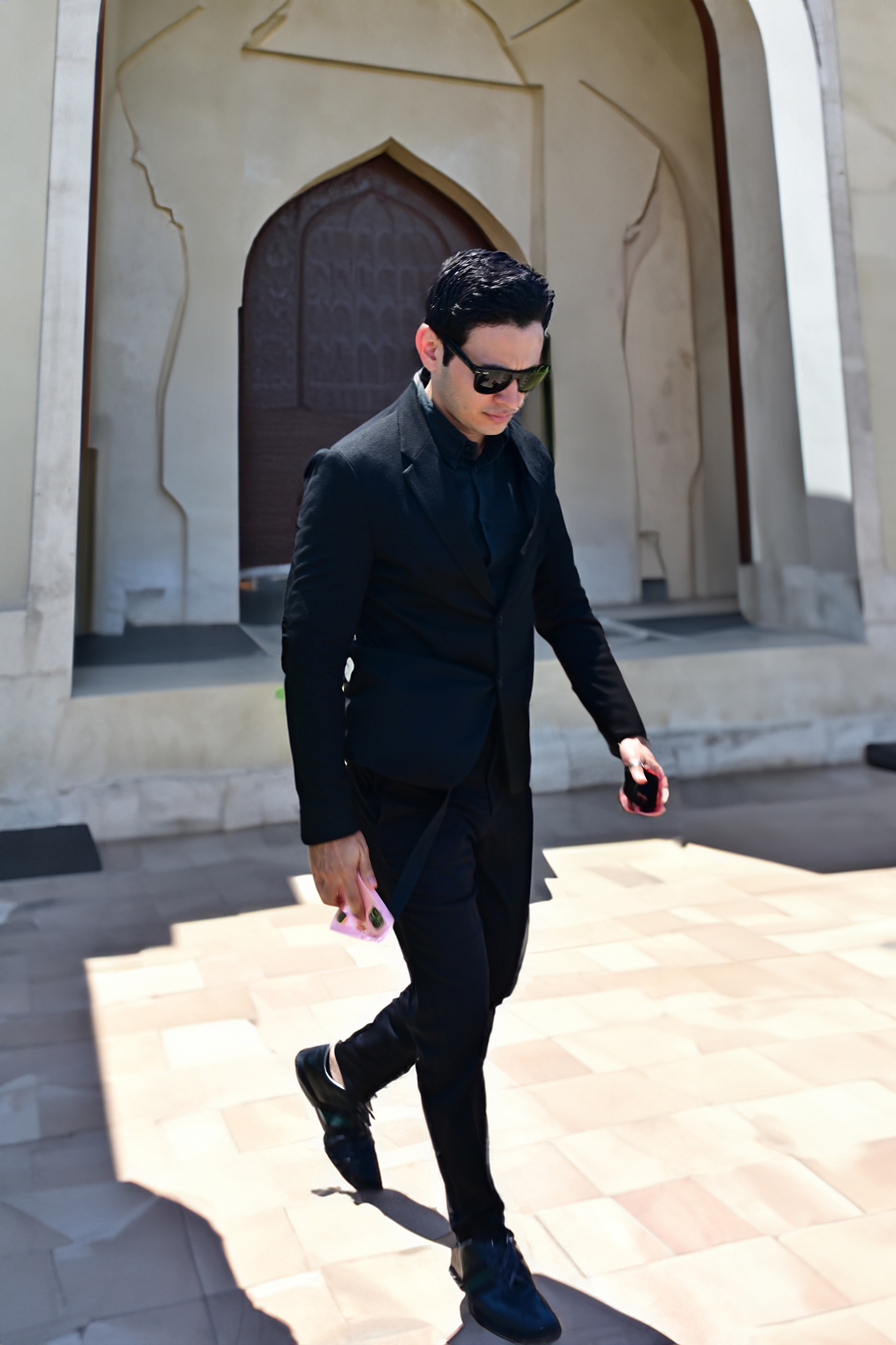
- Born: 10 February 1993 (age 32); Tegucigalpa, Honduras
- Education: Universidad Católica de Honduras; Yuan Ze University
- Occupations: Engineer; diplomat; actor; model

Fernando Miguel Palma Suazo (Note: Spanish: Fernando Palma, Chinese: 費南多帕馬) (born 10 February 1993) is a Honduran diplomat, model, and film and television actor. He is known as the cultural ambassador of Honduras to Taiwan.

== Biography ==
Palma was born in Tegucigalpa, Honduras, on 10 February 1993. Although he was born and raised in Honduras, Palma is also of mixed race: his father is from Italy and his mother is from Honduras. In his youth, he attended the bilingual Elvel school in Honduras. Palma studied Industrial Engineering at the Catholic University of Honduras. In 2015, he moved from Honduras to Taiwan. Two years later, he completed his master's studies in Industrial Engineering and Management at Yuan Ze University. The Taiwanese government recognized Fernando Palma as the first Latin American to enter the country's entertainment industry. He has become a Latin American media personality in the film and entertainment industry in Taiwan. He is fluent in Spanish, English, Mandarin, and Taiwanese.

== Film and television ==
He acted for sports brands in Taiwan. He has been recognized as a cultural Ambassador for his impact as a young Latino in Taiwanese society.

== Filmography ==
=== Films ===
Year	Title	Role	Notes
2019	Killer Not Stupid	Terrorist	Filmed in 亞洲大學

=== Variety Show ===
Year	English title	Mandarin title	Notes
2017	Half and Half	二分之一強	Appears as 費南多
2018-2022	WTO Sister Show	WTO姐妹會	Appears as 費南多
2018	Speak Out Loud Yes or No	請問你是哪裡人	Appears as 費南多

== Published works ==
- Palma, Fernando (2019). Reducing global supply chains' waste of overproduction by using lean principles: A conceptual approach. Hungary: Emerald Publishing Limited. ISSN 1756-669X.

== Awards and nominations ==
Year	Award	Category	Field
2019	Ten Outstanding Young Persons of the World	Personal improvement and/or accomplishment.	Entertainment
2019	Alliance française	International Cultural Ambassador	Entertainment
