= Maribel Espinoza =

Honduran lawyer and politician (born 1959)

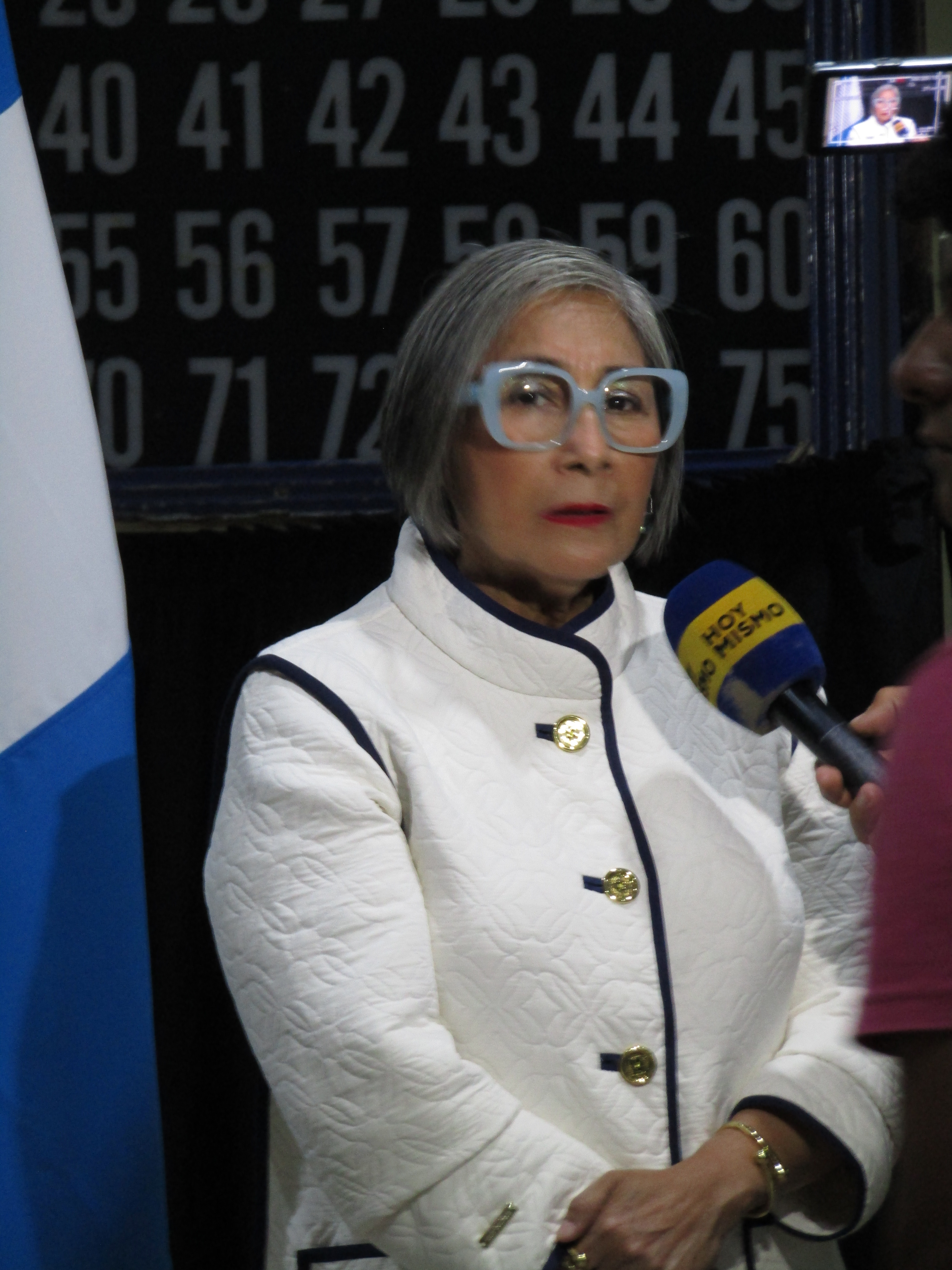
- Espinoza in 2025

Deputy of the National Congress of Honduras
- In office 25 January 2022 – 25 January 2026
- President: Luis Redondo
- Constituency: Yoro Department

Vice president of the Liberal Party of Honduras
- In office 8 May 2017 – 20 August 2020
- President: Luis Zelaya

Personal details
- Born: 24 March 1959 (age 67) Tegucigalpa, Honduras
- Party: Liberal Party of Honduras; Savior Party of Honduras
- Children: 2
- Education: Universidad Nacional Autónoma de Honduras

Maribel Espinoza Turcios (born 24 March 1959), also known as the "Iron Lady of Honduras", is a Honduran lawyer and politician. She was vice president of the centre-right Liberal Party of Honduras from 2017 to 2020. She was elected as a Deputy to the National Congress of Honduras for the Savior Party of Honduras in 2021 for the Yoro Department.

== Biography ==
Espinoza was born on 24 March 1959. Her parents were Lieutenant Colonel Andrés Espinoza and nurse Alma Turcios. Espinoza studied law at the Universidad Nacional Autónoma de Honduras. After graduating, she practiced as an attorney and was the director of a law firm.

Espinoza launched a campaign to become a presidential candidate for the centre-right Liberal Party of Honduras (Spanish: Partido Liberal de Honduras) in the 2017 Honduran general election, but was not selected. She served as vice president of the Liberal Party of Honduras from 8 May 2017 to 20 August 2020.

At the 2021 Honduran general election, Espinoza was elected as a Deputy to the National Congress of Honduras for the Savior Party of Honduras (Spanish: Partido Salvador de Honduras, PSH), representing the Yoro Department.

After re-joining the Liberal Party of Honduras in 2024, Espinoza stood as a presidential candidate in the 2025 Honduran general election, taking 5.08% of the vote.

Espinoza is also known as the "Iron Lady of Honduras".
