= Alba Consuelo Flores =

Honduras Secretary of Health

Alba Consuelo Flores Ferrufino (Danlí, November 30, 1965) is a Honduran pedagogue and civil servant, current Secretary of Health of the Republic, a position that she assumed on December 27, 2018, under the presidency of Juan Orlando Hernández. She has been a health officer since 2002.

== Personal life ==
Flores Ferrufino was born in Danlí, El Paraíso Department, on November 30, 1965, and later moved to Tegucigalpa, the capital of the country. She has 3 sons.

== Education ==
She graduated in educational sciences with an emphasis in educational administration from the Francisco Morazán National Pedagogical University and in business administration from the National Autonomous University of Honduras.

== Career ==
Starting in 2002, she began her journey as an official in the Ministry of Health of Honduras, where she has participated in different projects of modernization and decentralization of hospital management in various health centers in the country.

With extensive experience in hospital management, Flores Ferrufino has served as technical advisor to the secretariat's hospital department and as executive director of the San Lorenzo Hospital, in San Lorenzo, Valle. Likewise, in 2018 she was a member of the Special Commission for the Transformation of the Health System (CETSS) and the Supervisory Commission of the Hospital Escuela Universitario.

=== Secretary of Health (2018 - present) ===
On December 27, 2018, President Juan Orlando Hernández swore in Flores Ferrufino as Secretary of Health, replacing Dr. Octavio Sánchez.

The first measure that she announced after taking office was to give continuity to the process of transformation of public health, which began in 2018 with the creation of the Special Commission for the Transformation of the Health System (la Comisión Especial de Transformación del Sistema de Salud - CETSS).

On December 28, a day after taking office, she expressed the following during an interview with La Tribuna:

"Our final goal, as Secretary of State, together with the Health Commission, will be to implement a primary care model that leads us to improve the quality of care and, of course, the timely response in all areas of the health of the population."

==== Dengue epidemic ====
Between 2019 and 2020, the secretariat, under the direction of Flores Ferrufino and her work team, has had to face the dengue epidemic of 2019-2020, which has left thousands of cases and hundreds of deaths in the country.

==== Coronavirus pandemic ====
On March 11, 2020, Honduras recorded its first two cases of the COVID-19 pandemic that began in Wuhan, China in December of the previous year. It involved a 42-year-old woman, pregnant, who had traveled from Madrid, Spain (where she lived) to Tegucigalpa and another 37-year-old woman, resident in La Ceiba, who had traveled from San Pedro Sula to Geneva, Switzerland in February. On March 17, the first case was confirmed in San Pedro Sula, a 61-year-old man of Asian origin, who had traveled on business to New York City, United States in February. Those were the first cases registered in the three cities with the highest population density in the country.

On March 26, the first death from COVID-19 was registered in Honduras; a 60-year-old man living in the city of Villanueva.

On the morning of April 1, Flores Ferrufino and Mexican Piedad Huerta, representative of the Pan American Health Organization in the country, were quarantined due to suspicions of contagion by SARS-CoV-2 (the virus that causes COVID-19), after it became known that a close associate of both had tested positive for the disease the day before. The next day, April 2, the National Virology Laboratory announced that both tests had a negative result.
