= Óscar Acosta =

Honduran writer, poet, critic, politician and diplomat

Óscar Acosta Zeledón
- Born: 14 April 1933; Las Delicias, Honduras
- Died: 15 July 2014 (aged 81); Tegucigalpa
- Awards: Premio Rubén Darío (1960), el Premio Nacional de Literatura Ramón Sosa (1970)
- Scientific career
- Workplaces: Universidad Nacional Autónoma de Honduras

Óscar Acosta Zeledón (14 April 1933 – 15 July 2014) was a Honduran writer, poet, critic, politician and diplomat.

== Biography ==
He was born in the Las Delicias neighborhood of Tegucigalpa, Honduras, on 14 April 1933.

Acosta began his career as a journalist in Peru for Tegucigalpa Magazine. He founded la Editorial Nuevo Continente, las revistas Extra, Presente, la Editorial Iberoamericana, and Honduras Literaria y Extra. He was director of the University Press of the Universidad Nacional Autónoma de Honduras.

He came to notice in the 1950s and 1960s, with his short stories and poetry collections. In 1964, he published an essay on the Honduran writer Rafael Heliodoro Valle, to which he added later works such as "Anthology of the New Honduran Poetry" with the poet Roberto Sosa, "Honduran Poetry Today", and "Anthology of the Honduran Short Story".

He ran the literary sections of the newspapers El Día, now defunct, and El Heraldo. He was also a founder of Editorial Nuevo Continente, and the magazines Extra and Presente.

As a diplomat, Acosta represented his country in the Honduran legations in Spain, Italy, Peru and the Vatican. In 2000, when he was director of the Honduran Academy of Language, he nominated the Tegucigalpa-born Guatemalan writer Augusto Monterroso for the Prince of Asturias Award.

Acosta died in Tegucigalpa at the age of 81 on 15 July 2014.

== Works ==
- Responso poético al cuerpo presente de José Trinidad Reyes (1955)
- El arca (1956)
- Poesía menor (1957)
- Tiempo detenido (1962)
- Mi país (1971)
- Poesía. Selección 1952–1965 (1965)
- Poesía. Selección 1952–1971 (1976)
- Rafael Heliodoro Valle. Vida y obra (1964)

He also compiled poems from other authors in works such as Antología de la nueva poesía hondureña (1967) y Poesía hondureña de hoy (1971).

It is pertinent to mention the book Poesía, a selection of poems that the Poet Óscar Acosta created between the years 1952–1971 in Spain, Madrid, was published in 1976 by the publishing house Ediciones Cultura Hispánica. This selection of exclusive and intimate poetry by the author contains 111 poems, separated into the following classifications:

Poesía menor, a book that was published in the year 1957. In the essay "Anticipación el geranio" by Dr. Hector M. Leyva, which was published in the text "Lucidez Creativa", addresses the idea that short poems contain an affirmative action, in the sense that it can reclaim those things that may be despised, or negatively discriminated against. Short poetry, of the most basic, and modest. Modest poetry that alludes to bombast, in low key. Poetry spoken softly but not simply. If in the slightest it refers to the conscience, of the barely perceptible accidents of the world, then that poetry can be one of the most important.

In the case of the woman that is loved in Óscar Acosta's collection of poetry, the primary motive of his song in Formas del amor (1959), Escritura amorosa (1962) and Poemas para una muchacha (1963), the poet is convinced that he received the woman as a gift from heaven and that there may be no feeling as important as love.

== Awards ==
- 1960: Premio Rubén Darío
- 1979: Premio Nacional de Literatura Ramón Sosa
