= María Martha Díaz Velásquez =

Honduran politician (born 1951)

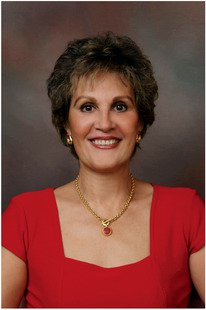
- Born: August 30, 1951 (age 74); Tegusigalpa, Honduras
- Occupation: politician

María Martha Díaz Velásquez (born 30 August 1951, in Tegusigalpa) is a Honduran politician. She was twice assigned a Minister of the National Institute of Women of Honduras in 1999 and in 2009. She is also known as the Heroine of the Chinazo (Heroina del Chinaso) for denouncing illegal sale of Honduran passports to thousands of Chinese citizens.

== The Heroine of the Chinazo ==
In 1992, Díaz separated with her husband René Contreras and the Judge left her three children in custody in the United States, but she violated the orders having brought her children to Honduras. In 1995, Díaz denounced that her ex-husband René Contreras was involved in sale of Honduran passports to Chinese citizens at a cost of $ 3,000 per person. Díaz sent to Radio America the documents on the Chinazo passport scam, which revealed Honduras-Hong Kong company promoting the naturalization of Chinese citizens. The documents read in a Radio American news program mentioned names of several relatives of former President Rafael Leonardo Callejas Romero, including Robert Callejas and Roberto Ramon Castillo Callejas, and former Minister of Government and Justice Francisco Cardona Arguelles.

On 8 August 1996 when she traveled to Miami with the aim to remove important evidence in the Chinazo case from a deposit box in the bank, she was arrested in Miami airport for violation of a custody ruling on her three children. Díaz remained in jail for approximately one year when a Miami judge ordered her immediate release.

== The National Institute of Women of Honduras (INAM) ==
In February 1999, Díaz was appointed a Director of the Government Women's Office (GMO), which she converted into the National Women's Institute (INAM). INAM was established to incorporate women into the sustainable development process with the focus on gender equality in the social, economic, political and cultural fields. Díaz held the office of the Minister of the INAM until January 2002.

In July 2009, Díaz was appointed the Minister of the National Institute of Women for the second time and remained in the office until January 2010. Her appointment caused some protests and the protesters attempted to prevent her entering the INAM building.
