= Danlí, El Paraíso =

Danlí
- Municipality
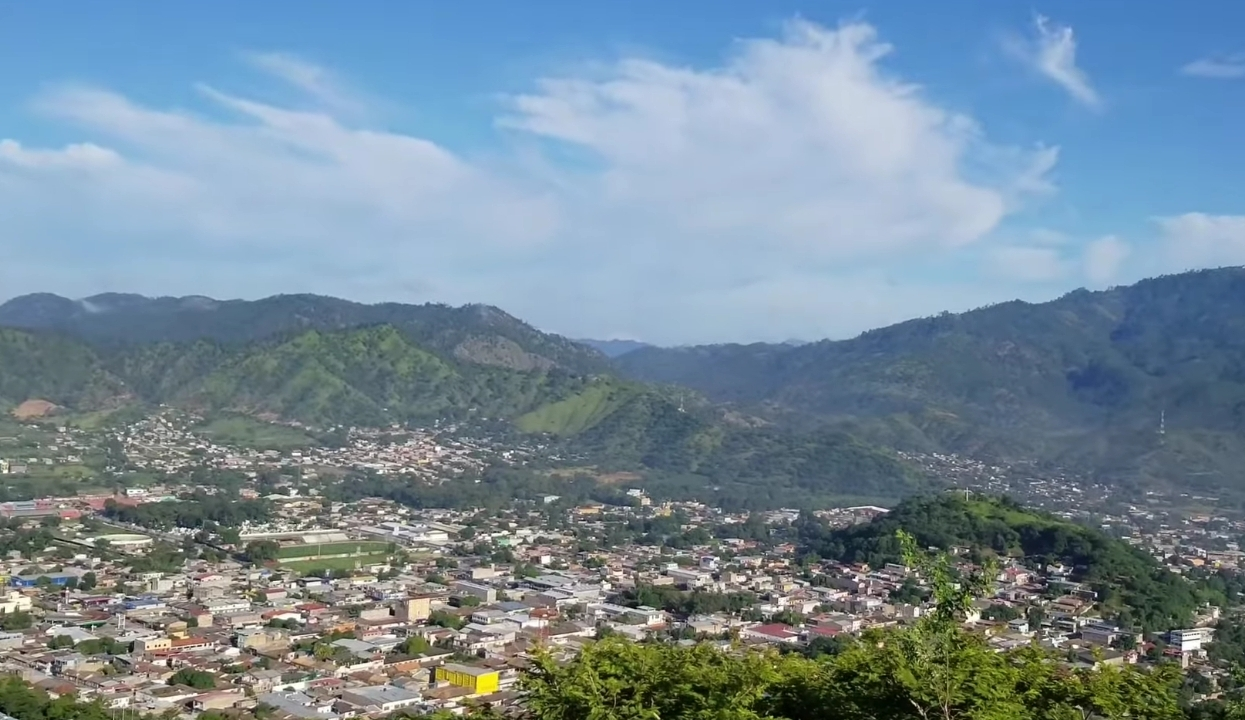

- Location within Honduras
- Coordinates: 14°3′0″N 86°35′0″W
- Country: Honduras
- Department: El Paraíso

Government
  - Mayor: Abraham Kafati Díaz

Area
  - Municipality: 2,518 km^{2} (972 sq mi)
- Elevation: 814 m (2,671 ft)

Population (2023 projection)
  - Municipality: 233,789
  - Density: 92.85/km^{2} (240.5/sq mi)
  - Urban: 94,344

Danlí is a city and a municipality in Honduras. It is currently the fourth most populated municipality in Honduras, located approximately 92 kilometers southeast of Tegucigalpa, in the Honduran department of El Paraíso known for its production of cigars and corn (maize). The city is situated at an altitude of 814 meters (2,673 feet) above sea level and has a population of 80,200 (2023 calculation) The population of the municipality (2018) is 214,566 people which is composed of 105,929 men and 108,637 women. With a population in the urban area of 85,075 people and in the rural area of 129,491 people.

== Nature ==
The official flower is the napoleón, a type of bougainvillea. The official tree is the jiñicuado (bursera simaruba). The official mammal is the howler monkey, an endangered species that inhabits the broad-leaf forests of the Apagüíz and Apapuerta mountains.

The region also has pine forests. Other fauna around Danlí include deer and several species of birds, such as the oropendula, parrot and mynah. Residents of rural areas near Danlí have reported jaguar and quetzal sightings.

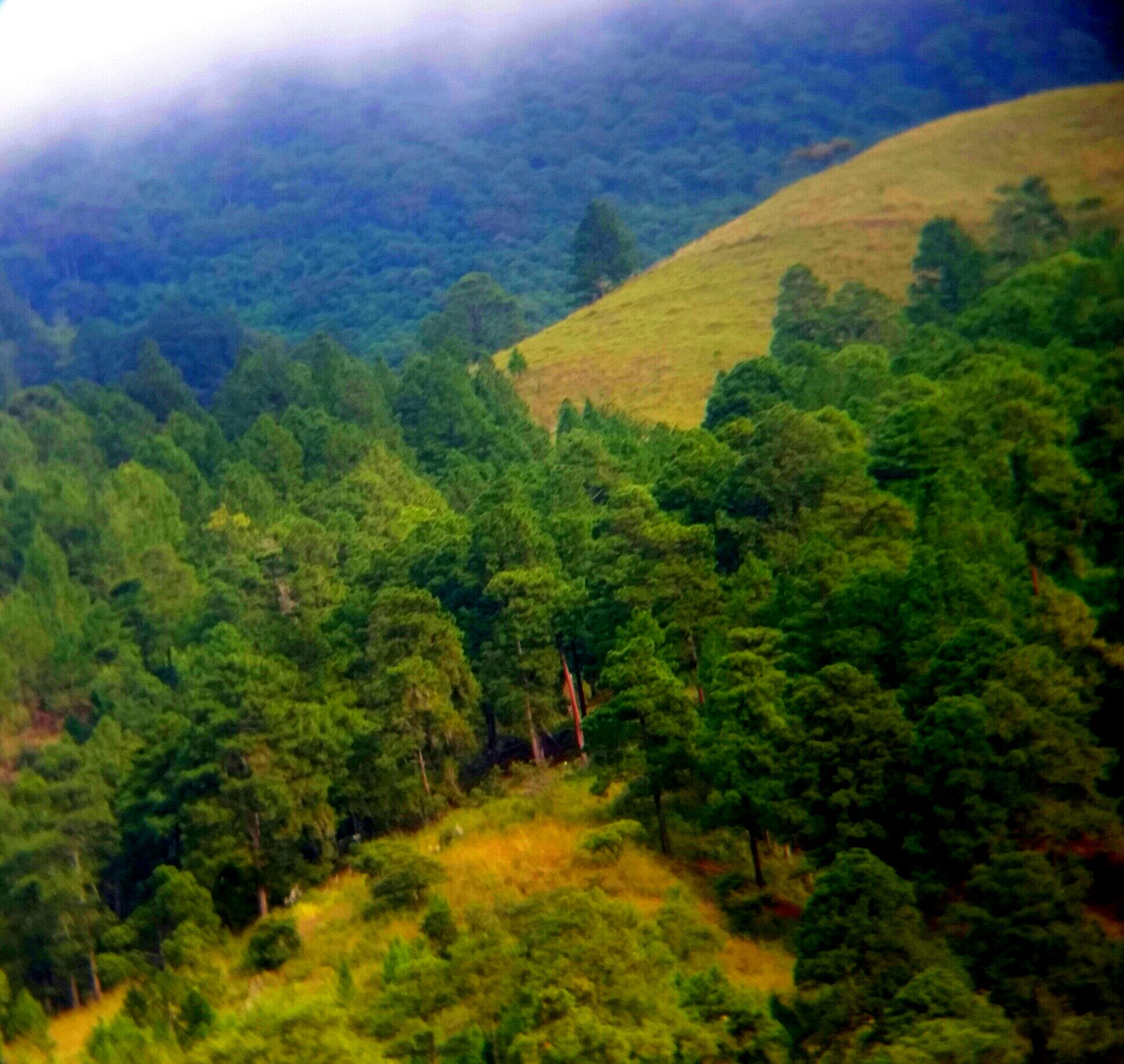
pine forest near of Danlí

A landmark is the mountain of Apagüíz, which has a prominent stone outcropping near the summit and is visible from the southern parts of the city.

== Danli Prison ==
The notorious Centro Penal de Danlí allows its inmates to enforce their own rules. Prisons in Honduras are in general desperately overcrowded – in September 2019 reports disclosed that they operated at 204% of their capacity. More than half of the detainees are still waiting for their court hearing and Law enforcement in Honduras is underfunded to an extent that escapes, drug abuse and corruption are common and even riots and target killings often cannot be prevented.

== Roman Catholic Suffragan Diocese ==
Since 2017, the city is the episcopal see of the Roman Catholic Diocese of Danlí, a suffragan diocese in the ecclesiastical province of the Metropolitan Roman Catholic Archdiocese of Tegucigalpa.

== Notable Person from Danlí, El Paraíso ==
- Alba Consuelo Flores, Secretary of Health of the Republic of Honduras.
- Oswaldo López Arellano, former president of Honduras.
- Abraham Kafati Díaz, Mayor of Danli and former member of the National Congress of Honduras.
