= José Trinidad Reyes =

Honduran priest

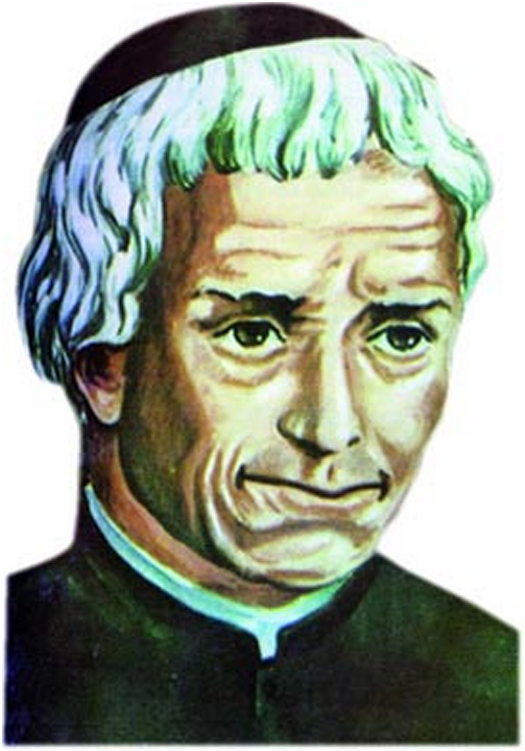
- "Wisdom, not only distinguishes man from the beasts, but it gives him superiority and preference over his peers." (Note: Translation from Spanish:“La sabiduría, no sólo distingue al hombre de las fieras, si no que le da superioridad y preferencia, sobre sus semejantes".)

Personal details
- Born: José Trinidad Reyes; June 11, 1797 Tegucigalpa, Captaincy General of Guatemala, Spanish Empire
- Died: September 20, 1855 (aged 58) Tegucigalpa, Honduras
- Denomination: Catholic
- Parents: Felipe Santiago de Reyes and María Francisca Sevilla
- Profession: Bachelor in Philosophy, Theology and Canon law

Father José Trinidad Reyes y Sevilla (born June 11, 1797 – September 20, 1855) was a Honduran priest who founded the National Autonomous University of Honduras, formerly called "La Sociedad del Genio emprendedor y del buen gusto" ('The Society of the Enterprising Genius and Good Taste'). He advocated against poverty by assisting the poor and supporting their right to education on matters of faith, culture, and science.

He wrote several theatrical pastorelas. These works established a base for the subsequent appearance of theatre in Honduras. Father Reyes presented these pastorelas in Tegucigalpa's churches. One song he wrote was "Navidad nuestra" ('Our Christmas'), which over time, has turned into a classic of Honduran contemporary theater due to its harmonious mixing of different traditions that take place during Christmas in Honduras.

Reyes was a polemicist in favor of women's rights. His stance is reflected in his pastorelas, which feature strong female characters in many of his works. His most celebrated document, a feminist manifesto, appeared under the pseudonym of Sofía Seyers. In it, Reyes pleads for women to be given the right to basic education. Many ideas expressed by Reyes in this article were inspired by the ideas of the women of the French Revolution. Reyes was influenced by ideas from The Enlightenment, Humanism and Religious Art.

Reyes was convinced of the importance of the arts, especially theater, as an instrument to civilize and bring progress to nations. During his life in Tegucigalpa he fought against political fanaticism and religious superstition.

== Biography ==
José Trinidad Reyes was born to music teacher Felipe Santiago de Reyes and María Francisca Sevilla in San Miguel County, Tegucigalpa. He was baptized on June 14 of same year, at three days old, by the Reverend Father Fray Nicolás Hermosilla.

In 1804, he entered a private school in Tegucigalpa where he was taught reading and teaching of the Catholic faith by Miss Góme. In 1812, at age 15, he learned Latin. He took music classes from Friar Juan Altamiran, of the convent "Nuestra Señora de las Mercedes", and learned to draw from Mr. Rafael U. Martínez, a Guatemalan painter located in Honduras.

On June 20,1815, in order to continue his studies, Reyes left Tegucigalpa for León, Nicaragua under the guard of a farmworker named Miguel Alvarez. He was accompanied by devotees who were on pilgrimage to the town of El Viejo. In León, he earned a bachelor's degree in Philosophy, Theology and Canon Law, and perfected his knowledge of music by getting a job as assistant of the Kapellmeister of León's cathedral. In 1819, he joined the Convento de los Recoletos de León ('Convent of the Recoletos of León') as a novice, and later became a Subdeacon of that convent.

=== Diaconate and priesthood ===
In 1825, he began his religious profession as deacon and priest, receiving orders from the bishop of the city, Garcia Jeredue. Due to the civil war in Nicaragua during 1825, the Recoletos were expelled and saw themselves forced to go to Guatemala. There, Reyes studied the Greek and Latin classics, works of the Spanish dramatists Lope de Vega and Calderón de la Barca, and read some theatrical pieces from Mexico, especially from Oaxaca and Chiapas. He finished his humanist and religious education in Guatemala.

In 1828, with permission from his superiors, Reyes returned to Honduras to spend time with his family. He passed through the town of Chiquimula and stopped in Esquipulas, where it is said that he lost his sight for a few days. On the afternoon of July 13, he arrived to the nearby town "La Concepcion" ('The Conception') —or Comayagüela— and at next day celebrated his first mass in the church of "La Concepción".

After that, Reyes was installed in the vacant convent of "Nuestra Señora de la Mercedes", located in Tegucigalpa. According to his biographer Ramón Rosa, that would be his habitual dwelling until his death.

In 1830, Trinidad Reyes wrote in verse a birthday felicitation to General Francisco Morazán, president of the Federal Republic of Central America.

In 1835, he rebuilt the chapel of the temple in "La Merced" and the temples in "San Francisco" and "El Calvario". He also built the small temples in "Las Casitas", the temple "Soraguara" and "Suyapa", since then famous for its little virgin. He also helped to Mr. Antonio Tranquilino de la Rosa in the reparation of the Parochial Church of Tegucigalpa, which was in ruins due to land tremors at 1809.

In February 1837, Reyes pronounced a praise sermon to mark the restoration of Parochial Church of Tegucigalpa, where he opened his Mass called "El Tancredo". The same year, he contracted Asian cholera during his work helping victims, and barely survived after being "between life and death", according to Ramón Rosa.

In 1838, he wrote his "Second Pastorela" Micol, dedicated to Misses Juana y Rafaela Robelo. Previously had written Noemí that, according to his biographers, is his earliest work, written between 1828 and this year.

In 1840, Reyes wrote an autos sacramentales divided into three acts, Adoración a los Santos Reyes Magos (literally translated: Adoration to the Three Magician Kings, e.g. the Wise Men). He also wrote the book Las Ideas de Sofia Seyers (literally translated: Sofia Seyers' Ideas), promoting a woman's right to education.

In 1841, he opened his pastorela Micol in Tegucigalpa.

In 1842, Reyes was nominated in the list of candidates to occupy the Honduras' church diocese. He appointed the presbyter Mr. Francisco de Paula Campoy y Pérez, who had been Vicar Departmental of Gracias. However, Dr. Ramón Rosa claims Father Reyes was appointed as Honduras' Bishop by Gregory XVI. In 1845, he traveled to city Comayagua, where traded [sic?] the recently consecrated Honduras' Bishop, Campoy y Pérez. Ramón Rosa declares that Reyes was there as detained by orders of General Francisco Ferrera.

On December 14 of that year, he installed himself at the Government House, the "Society of the Enterprising Genius and Good Taste", where he later founded the Honduras Autonomous University. As a rector of the university, Reyes gave an eloquent opening speech, whose text was recorded by Esteban Guardiola in his History of the University of Honduras.

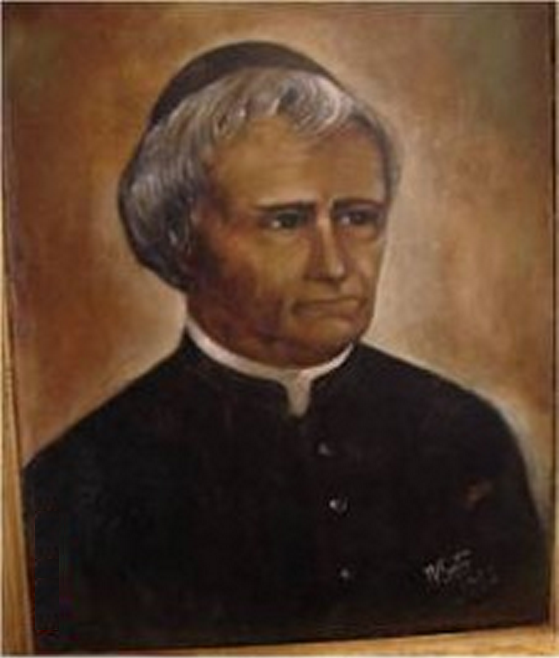
Portrait of Father José Trinidad Reyes, painted by Teresa de Fortín, currently located at the National Gallery of Art

In 1846, he went to Comayagua, and on May 23, wrote his Elegy to General Mr. Francisco Ferrera, on the death of his son Fulgencio. This composition shows, relatively, that he did not have enmity with General Francisco Ferrera, but the contrary, a familiarity.

In June 1847, he returned to Tegucigalpa due to his mother's death.

On September 19, Trinidad Reyes opened the Honduras' University, chairing the event with the chief of state Mr Juan Lindo and Bishop Campoy y Perez. That year, he organized the first Honduras' library called "Library of the Academy", and made first operational print of the Honduran country, the "Print of the Academy", which was brought by General Francisco Morazán in 1829.

Reyes brought the first piano to the city Tegucigalpa, believed to have formerly been in the municipality Ojojona, property of the Díaz Zelaya family by his biographers.
This same year he wrote one of his acquaintances When..., satirical compositions and filled of family humour. To these, only three numbers were conserved, written in tenths octosyllabic and ending with the exclamation "when".

On February 9, 1848, Reyes wrote his well-known "Invitation to stroll to the lake" to the society of Tegucigalpa, made by petition of students.

In 1849, his father died, due to mental illness.
On April 16 of 1850, Reyes wrote his poem Honduras, which has six octaves in ten syllables and is dedicated to the generals Gerardo Barrios and Trinidad Cabañas, and all soldiers, officers and chiefs of El Salvador and Honduras.
On September 29 of the same year, he wrote his poem "To the independence", which consists of seven octaves in ten syllables, and a quartet as the epigraph.

On February 2, 1851, the Candlemas Day, he opened with his pastorela Elisa, dedicated to the Juana and Jerónima Godoy. By then he had written and presented his pastorelas: Neftalia, Selfa and Rubenia. The first was dedicated to María and Isidora Reyes, who did the role of Séfora. The other two pastorelas were dedicated to Manuela Vega, Juana Velásquez and Maclovia Bonilla.
He also wrote his pastorela Albano, which he dedicated to Raimunda Milla, and although it was rehearsed, it was never performed due to threatened violence over the appearing of political figures, according Ramón Rosa.

On September 15, 1852, he presented his Political-Religious Discourse at the opening of Central American Congress, in Tegucigalpa. On October 10, he wrote and issued his Octaves to the deputies of the National Constituent Congress.

On September 10,1853, he wrote Canto Elegíaco, on the death of Bishop Mt. Jorge Viteri y Ungo.

In early 1855, Reyes had a stomach illness and was treated by the doctors Mr. Máximo Soto and Mr. Hipólito Matute. This year he published his Elementary Lessons of Physics, which in March, with the Printer of Academy, became a study book for the youth of the time.

Before June, he traveled to the city Comayagua, to visit the bishop, Hipólito Casiano Flores, who had come to consecrate himself from El Salvador, and who he accompanied on his first Pontifical Mass, according to Ramón Rosa.
In his final year, he wrote his most poetically successful pastorela, Olympia, named probably by inspiration of the French feminist Olympe de Gouges, murdered by her struggle for equality between men and women. This work was dedicated to a young lady, Trinidad Boquín.
He retired to the country, to the neighboring village of Soroguara, to recover his health, and returned in late August to Tegucigalpa, where, he was on his deathbed until his death on September 20 at 10am, surrounded by his disciples and families in the room now occupied by the National Archive. His remains are buried in the Parish Church.

=== Literary criticism ===
Rubén Darío said of Father Reyes: "This was a simple poet, though sometimes he took flight with the audacity of a magnificent inspiration. His main works were made to be sung or performed."

== Sources ==
- Aguilar-Paz Cerrato, Francisco Salvador (March–April 1965). "José Trinidad Reyes". Honduras Literaria. 14. Universidad Nacional Autónoma de Honduras.
- Aguilar-Paz Cerrato, Francisco Salvador. "José Trinidad Reyes: Dramaturgo". Archived from the original on 2014-02-02.
- Castro, Carlos M. "José Trinidad Reyes (Honduras, 1797-1855)". Archived from the original on 2009-08-05.
