= Universidad Católica de Honduras =

University in Honduras

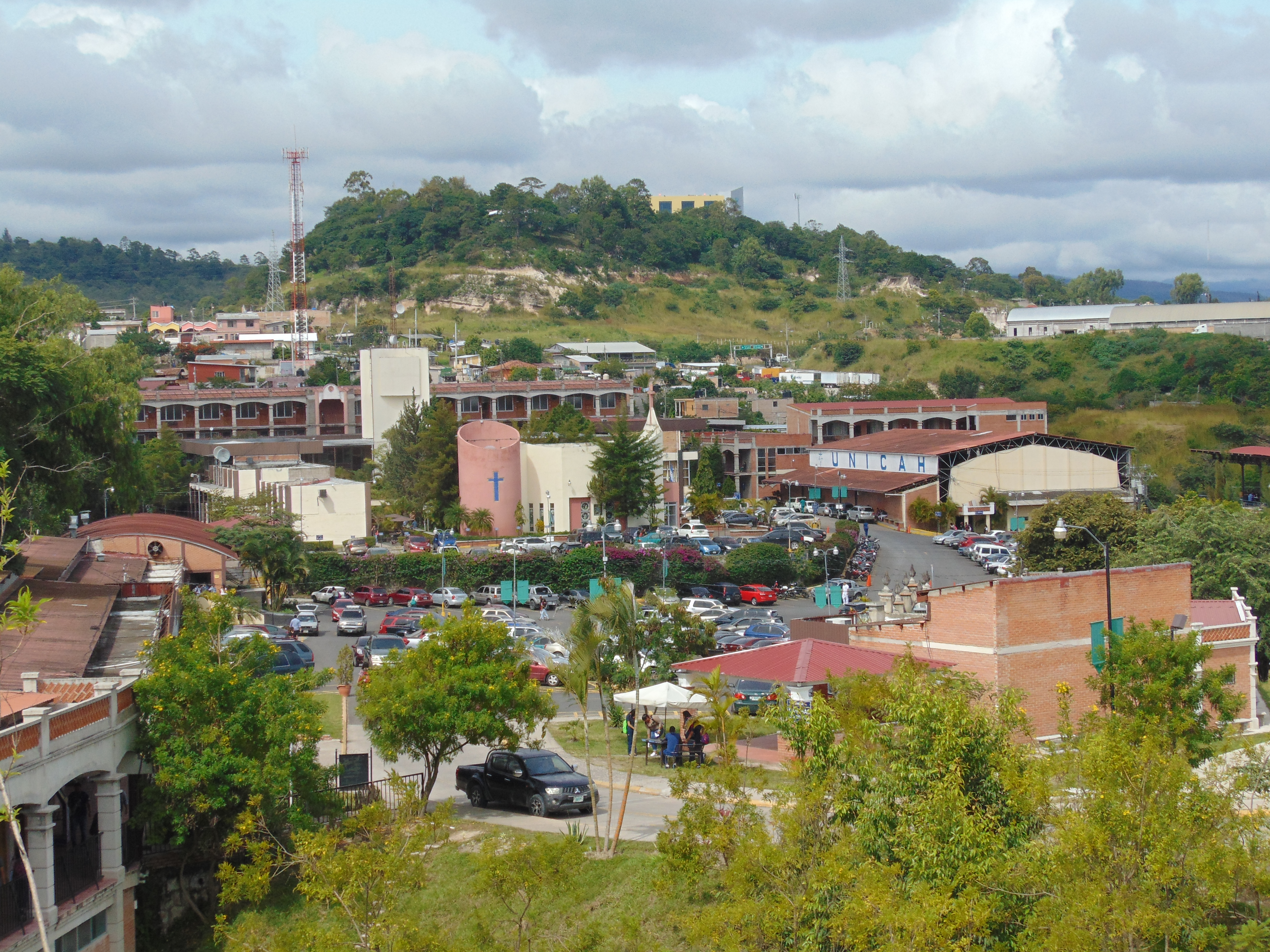
Comayaguela campus

The Universidad Católica de Honduras, officially named "Universidad Católica de Honduras Nuestra Señora Reina de la Paz" (Catholic University of Honduras Our Lady Queen of Peace), or "UNICAH" as it is affectionately called among its students, is a private university in Honduras run by the Catholic Church. It has 11 campuses in various cities, in the country such as:

- Campus San José, Tegucigalpa (14.0542°N 87.2498°W)
- Campus Sagrado Corazón de Jesús, Comayagüela
- Campus San Pedro y San Pablo, San Pedro Sula (15.5173°N 88.0354°W)
- Campus San Isidro, La Ceiba
- Campus Santa Clara, Juticalpa
- Campus Dios Espíritu Santo, Choluteca (13.3101°N 87.1604°W)
- Campus Jesús Sacramentado, Siguatepeque
- Campus Santa Rosa de Lima, Santa Rosa de Copán
- Campus Santiago Apóstol, Danli, El Paraíso (14.0253°N 86.5817°W)
- Campus San Jorge, Olanchito, Yoro
- Campus Espiritualidad El Tabor, Valle de Ángeles
