= Corbevax =

Protein subunit vaccine against COVID-19

Vaccine description
- Target: SARS-CoV-2
- Vaccine type: Protein subunit

Clinical data
- Trade names: Corbevax
- Other names: BECOV2D, Biological E COVID-19
- Routes of administration: Intramuscular
- ATC code: J07BN04 (WHO)

Legal status
- Legal status: Full list of Corbevax authorizations

Corbevax is a protein subunit COVID-19 vaccine developed by Texas Children's Hospital Center for Vaccine Development and Baylor College of Medicine in Houston, Texas and Dynavax technologies based in Emeryville, California. It is licensed to Indian biopharmaceutical firm Biological E. Limited (BioE) for development and production.

== Technology ==
The vaccine consists of a version of the receptor binding domain (RBD) of the SARS‑CoV‑2 spike protein, together with the adjuvants aluminium hydroxide gel and CpG 1018. As the RBD protein is poorly immunogenic alone, adjuvantation is essential for a RBD-based vaccine immunogenicity. Researchers at the Precision Vaccine Program at Boston Children's Hospital and Harvard Medical School, in Boston, Massachusetts, in collaboration with Texas Children's Hospital Center for Vaccine Development and Baylor College of Medicine in Houston, Texas, undertook a screening process that compared multiple molecules head-to-head in different combinations. Two adjuvants — aluminum hydroxide and CpG—proved to be the most successful combination when added to the RBD protein, especially in models of older populations. The protein is produced by the yeast Pichia pastoris; the process is similar to that of existing Hepatitis B vaccines.

== Manufacturing ==
In April 2021, the U.S. International Development Finance Corporation (DFC) announced that it would fund the expansion of Biological E's manufacturing capabilities, so that it could produce at least 1 billion doses by the end of 2022.

== History ==
=== Clinical trials ===
A phase I clinical trial was carried out to evaluate the safety and immunogenicity of the vaccine candidate in about 360 participants. The phase II concluded in April 2021.

In April 2021, the Drugs Controller General of India permitted the vaccine candidate to start phase III clinical trials. A total of 1,268 healthy participants between the age of 18 and 80 years to be selected from 15 sites across India for the trial and intended to be part of a larger global Phase III study. On 3 June 2021, India's Ministry of Health and Family Welfare pre-ordered 300 million doses.

As of December 2021, Biological E announced positive results, but some experts criticized the lack of public data from phase III trials. The developer specifically claimed the vaccine appeared to be over 90% effective against the original variant based on antibody levels. On 28 December 2021, India approved the vaccine for emergency use.

=== 2022 ===
In January 2022, the developers declared that no G7 countries had funded the project and reiterated their plea for funding for mass production and distribution, arguing that Moderna had received much more support.

As of August, 70 million doses had been administered to adolescents in India. It was also approved by the Botswana Medicines Regulator Authority. A study reported that the heterologous (Corbevax plus Zycov-D) vaccine was effective against Omicron in India.

== Financing ==
Vaccine development was partly financed with $7 million from mostly private investors, including a $1 million donation by Tito's Vodka. The vaccine technology, for antigen production and use, is given patent-free to manufacturers, although Baylor College receives a fee.

The evaluation of adjuvant components for use in a RBD based vaccine was partially enabled by NIH funding along with prior funding to support development of the CpG adjvuant for use in vaccines.

The BioE company planned to priced the shot at ₹250 (around $3) per dose.

== Licensing ==
The vaccine is not patented and is planned to be openly licensed under COVAX.

== See also ==
- Sanofi–GSK COVID-19 vaccine
