= Secretary of State for Culture, Arts and Sports =

- Secretaría de Estado en los Despachos de Cultura, Artes y Deportes
- Coat of arms of Honduras

Secretary of State overview
- Formed: June 23, 1975
- Preceding Secretary of State: Secretary of State for Culture, Tourism and Information
- Headquarters: Tegucigalpa, Honduras
- Annual budget: HNL 216 m (2012)
- Minister responsible: Anarella Vélez Osejo (in 2022)

The Secretary of State for Culture, Arts and Sports (informally Culture Secretary) is a Honduras secretary of State responsible for the formulation, coordination, implementation and evaluation of policies relating to research, rescue and dissemination of the cultural heritage, arts education and the identification, preservation and protection of historical and cultural heritage of the nation and all matters relating to the organization, promotion and development of sports.

== History ==
It was created in 1975 as Secretary of State in the Ministry of Culture, Tourism and Information, to bring together institutions like the National Library centennial Juan Ramon Molina and the National Archives of Honduras, the latest Manuel Bonilla and National Theater Institute Honduran Anthropology and History.

It annually awards various prizes as s recognition to the artistic and cultural production in Honduras, such as Laurel Leaf award in Gold and National Art Prize Pablo Zelaya Sierra, African Heritage Award, National Award for Voluntary Cultural and since 2006 the National Prize for Fiction Children and Youth. From 1990 to 2007, the Ministry of Culture, Arts and Sports together with the Cultural Center of Spain in Tegucigalpa and the National School of Fine ArtesDesam convened every November 15 Anthology of Visual Arts of Honduras2 to encourage and document the annual creativity and enhance the social projection ENBA Also, each year paid tribute to a master of the Honduran plastic.

In January 2022 Anarella Vélez Osejo became the Secretary of State for Culture, Arts and Sports in Xiomara Castro's government.

== Social inclusion ==
Secretary of State for Culture, Arts and Sports is working to preserve and improve cultural arts and traditions of honduran amerindian groups, among them Lenca, Miskito, Ch'orti', Tolupan, Pech or Paya Indians and Sumo or Tawahka and also Afro-Honduran population; Garifuna and Creoles.

== See also ==
- Art of Honduras
- Culture of Honduras
- Visual arts of Honduras
- Education in Honduras
- Sport in Honduras
- Escuela Nacional de Bellas Artes (Honduras)
- Honduran folklore
- Honduran cuisine
- Instituto Hondureño de Antropología e Historia
- Pre-Columbian Honduras
- History of Honduras
- Demographics of Honduras
