= Leticia de Oyuela =

Honduran historian

Irma Leticia Silva de Oyuela (20 August 1935 – January 23, 2008) was a Honduran historian.

== Personal life ==
Irma Leticia Silva de Oyuela was born 20 August 1935, in Tegucigalpa. She was the daughter of Leónidas Silva Valladares and Bertha Rodríguez Durón. She married Felix Oyuela in 1956. They had six children. While accompanying her husband in his diplomatic mission, she took the opportunity to study in Madrid and Rome.

== Career ==
She studied at the Institute of Tegucigalpa where she completed her thesis of Bachelor of Science and Letters on the history of Colonial Art in Honduras. She later obtained a degree in Legal and Social Sciences at the National Autonomous University of Honduras.

She met writer Oscar Acosta, with whom she founded the Nuevo Continente Publishing House and was in charge of the Leo Gallery.

She was also a member of the Foundation for the Museo del Hombre Hondureño.

Her work is mainly oriented to the promotion of culture, the Honduran plastic arts and the sociological study of women in her country. Among her many scholarly works, she wrote the book El Naif en Honduras.

== Work ==
- Notas sobre Ramón Rosa (1968), en colaboración con Ramón Oquelí
- Notas sobre la evolución histórica de la mujer en Honduras (1989)
- Cuatro hacendadas del siglo XIX (1989)
- Historia mínima de Tegucigalpa vista a través de las fiestas del patrono San Miguel a partir de 1680 hasta finales del siglo XIX (1989)
- Fe/ riqueza y poder. Antología crítica de documentos para la historia de Honduras (1992)
- José Manuel Gómes [sic], pintor criollo (1992)
- Mujer, familia y sociedad: una aproximación histórica (1993)
- Ramón Rosa: plenitudes y desengaños (1994);
- Religiosidad popular. Raíz de la identidad hondureña (1996)
- Dos siglos de amor (1998)
- De santos y pecadores. Un aporte para la historia de las mentalidades (1999)
- De la corona a la libertad (2000)
- La Virgen María en la plástica hondureña (2000)
