= Universidad Nacional Autónoma de Honduras =

Public university in Honduras

Coordinates: 14°5′7″N 87°9′47″W

National Autonomous University of Honduras
- Universidad Nacional Autónoma de Honduras
- Type: Public university
- Established: 19 September 1847; 179 years ago
- Administrative staff: 4980
- Students: 95960 (2018)
- Location: Honduras
- Campus: Urban
- Athletics: 40 varsity teams
- Mascot: Pumas
- Website: www.unah.edu.hn

The National Autonomous University of Honduras (Spanish: Universidad Nacional Autónoma de Honduras) is the national public university of Honduras. Founded in 1847, it has over 140 programs from the Bachelor's level to the Doctorate, and is the largest and highest ranked university in Honduras.

== History ==
In December 1845, La Sociedad del Genio Emprendedor y del Buen Gusto was founded by Father José Trinidad Reyes as a private school. By 1847, it received backing from President Juan Lindo, and was reestablished as the University of Honduras, operating in the Church of St. Francis. In 1896, it was relocated to a building next to La Merced Church. In 1957, the military government gave the University autonomy, and it was renamed the National Autonomous University of Honduras. It later moved to the University City, where it operates today.

== Campuses ==
=== University city ===
The main campus is located in the country's capital of Tegucigalpa and is home to the university's Medical School hospital and campus. Located in the city is the Observatorio Astronómico Centroamericano de Suyapa (OACS/UNAH), which uses a 42 cm Meade telescope.

=== Other campuses ===
Apart from the main campus, UNAH has eight Regional Centers. Those centers include UNAH Valle de Sula in San Pedro Sula, the Centro Universitario Regional del Litoral Atlantico (CURLA) in La Ceiba, the Centro Universitario Regional del Centro (CURC) in Comayagua, the Centro Universitario Regional Litoral Pacífico (CURLP) in the city of Choluteca, the Centro Tecnológico de Danlí in Danlí, El Paraíso, the Centro Universitario Regional de Occidente (CUROC) in Santa Rosa de Copán, the Centro Tecnológico del Valle de Aguan (CURVA) in Olanchito, and the Centro Universitario Regional Nororiental (CURNO) in Juticalpa, Olancho. It is currently Honduras' largest university in terms of student enrollment and one of the largest university systems in Central America.

== Athletics ==
UNAH's university city is home to a sports complex named the Palacio Universitario, which has the 7,500 seat Estadio Olímpico José Trinidad Reyes, opened to the public in 2014. The university has 40 teams, including basketball, volleyball, soccer, and futsal.

== Library ==
The UNAH Library system was founded in the late 1960s; the first principal was English librarian Mary Hallam (from 1968 to 1972). This library has more than 16,000 volumes. It has a website and some e-books.

Every campus of UNAH has its own library.

== Notable faculty ==
- María Cristina Pineda Suazo, Dean of the Faculty of Spatial Sciences
- Anarella Vélez Professor of Art History, poet, and the Secretary of State for Culture, Arts and Sports in 2022.

== Notable alumni ==
- Alba Consuelo Flores, Secretary of Health of the Republic of Honduras
- Marco Antonio Andino Flores, Honduran politician
- Maria Elena Bottazzi, Associate Dean of the National School of Tropical Medicine at Baylor College of Medicine.
- Maribel Espinoza, Honduran lawyer and politician

== See also ==
- Education in Honduras
- List of universities in Honduras
- Palacio Universitario de la Universidad Nacional Autónoma de Honduras
- UNAH Center for Art and Culture
