= Nahuas =

Indigenous ethnic group in Mesoamerica

Masewalij
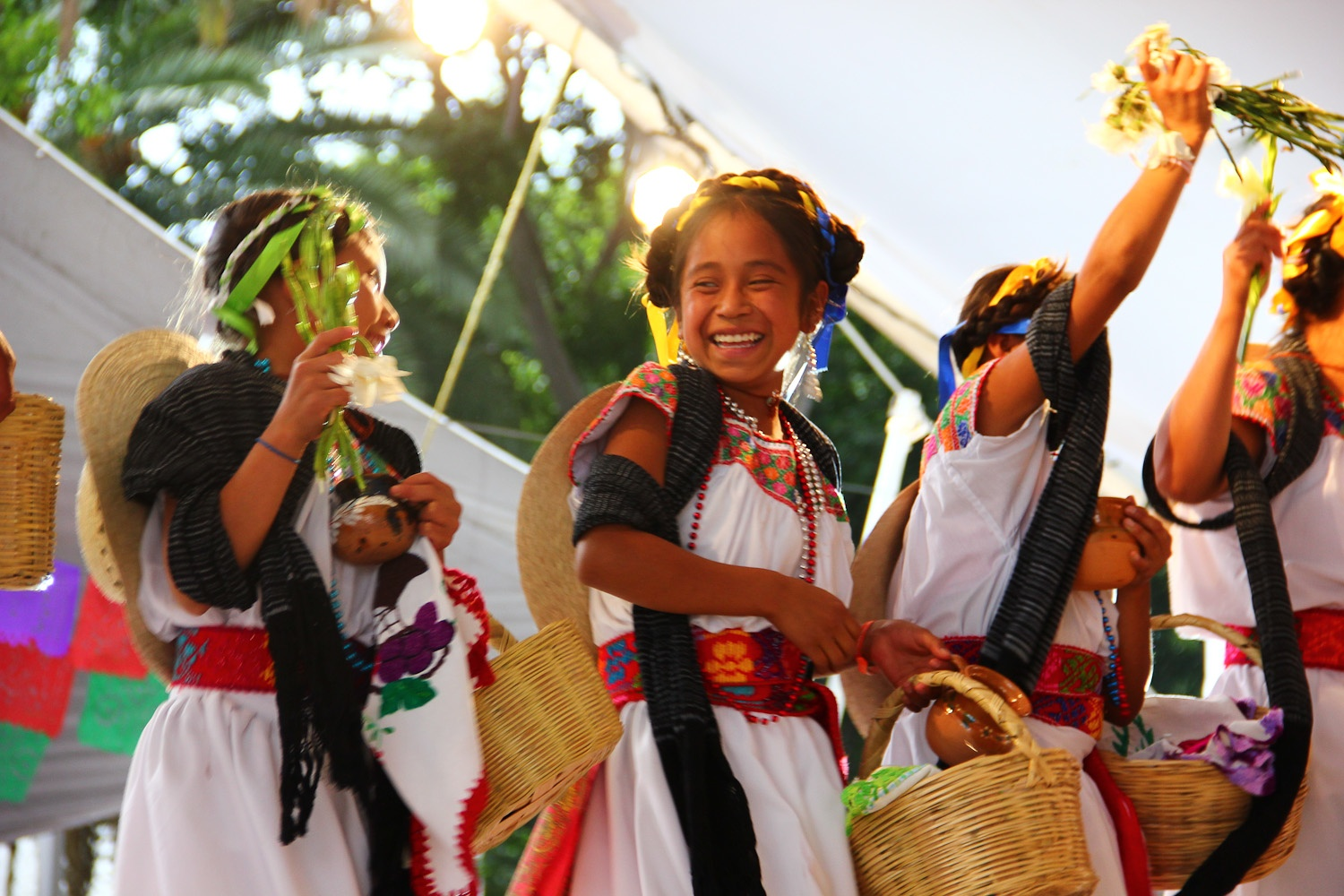
- Nahua girls wearing traditional clothing in Puebla

Total population
- 2,643,236+

Regions with significant populations
- Mexico States: Veracruz; Puebla; Hidalgo; Guerrero; Michoacán; Morelos; San Luis Potosí; Estado de México; Tlaxcala; Mexico City; Durango; Oaxaca: 2,587,452
- El Salvador Departments: Ahuachapán; Sonsonate; San Salvador; Santa Ana; Cuscatlán; La Libertad; La Paz; San Vicente: 29,445
- Nicaragua Departments: Rivas; Nueva Segovia; Chinandega; Managua; Masaya; Granada; Carazo; León; Río San Juan; Chontales; Boaco: 20,000
- Honduras: 6,339

Languages
- Nahuatl, Nahuat and Spanish

Religion
- Christianity (Predominantly Roman Catholic with pre-Columbian influence), Aztec religion

Related ethnic groups
- Pipil, Nicarao, Maya peoples, Mexicaneros, Indigenous people of the Americas and Mestizo, Mexica, Tlaxcaltec, Huichol, Tarahumara, Chichimeca, Labatulabal, Hopi, and all Uto-Aztecan people

The Nahuas (/ˈnɑːwɑːz/ NAH-wahz) are a Uto-Nahuan ethnic group and one of the Indigenous people of Mexico, with Nahua minorities also in El Salvador, Guatemala, Honduras, Nicaragua, and Costa Rica. They comprise the largest Indigenous group in Mexico, as well as the largest population out of any North American Indigenous people group who are native speakers of their respective Indigenous language. Amongst the Nahua, this is Nahuatl. When ranked amongst all Indigenous languages across the Americas, Nahuas list third after speakers of Guaraní and Quechua.

The Mexica, Acolhua, Tepanec, Chalca, Xochimilca,Tlahuica, Tlaxcalteca (Aztecs) are of Nahua ethnicity, as are their historical enemies and allies of the Spaniards: the Tlaxcallans (Tlaxcaltecs). The Toltecs which predated both groups are often thought to have been Nahua as well. However, in the pre-Columbian period Nahuas were subdivided into many groups that did not necessarily share a common identity.

Their Nahuan languages, or Nahuatl, consist of many variants, several of which are mutually intelligible. About 1.5 million Nahuas speak Nahuatl and another million speak only Spanish. Fewer than 2,000 native speakers of Nawat remain in El Salvador & Nicaragua.

It is suggested that the Nahua peoples originated near Aridoamerica, in regions of the present day Mexican states of Durango and Nayarit or the Bajío region. They split off from the other Uto-Aztecan speaking peoples and migrated into central Mexico around 500 CE. The Nahua then settled in and around the Basin of Mexico and spread out to become the dominant people in central Mexico. However, Nahuatl-speaking populations were present in smaller populations throughout Mesoamerica.

== Nomenclature ==
The name Nahua is derived from the Nahuatl word-root nāhua- [ˈnaːwa-], which generally means "audible, intelligible, clear" with different derivations including "language" (hence nāhuat(i) [ˈnaːwat(i)] "to speak clearly" and nāhuatl [ˈnaːwat͡ɬ] both "something that makes an agreeble sound" and "someone who speaks well or speak one's own language"). It was used in contrast with popoloca [popoˈloka], "to speak unintelligibly" or "speak a foreign language". Another, related term is Nāhuatlācatl [naːwaˈt͡ɬaːkat͡ɬ] (singular) or Nāhuatlācah [naːwaˈt͡ɬaːkaʔ] (plural) literally "Nahuatl-speaking people".

The Nahuas are also sometimes referred to as Aztecs. Using this term for the Nahuas has generally fallen out of favor in scholarship, though it is still used for the Aztec Empire. They have also been called Mēxihcatl [meːˈʃiʔkat͡ɬ] (singular), Mēxihcah [meːˈʃiʔkaʔ] (plural) or in Spanish Mexicano(s) [mexiˈkano(s)] "Mexicans", after the Mexica, the Nahua tribe which founded the Aztec Empire.

== Distribution ==
=== In Mexico ===
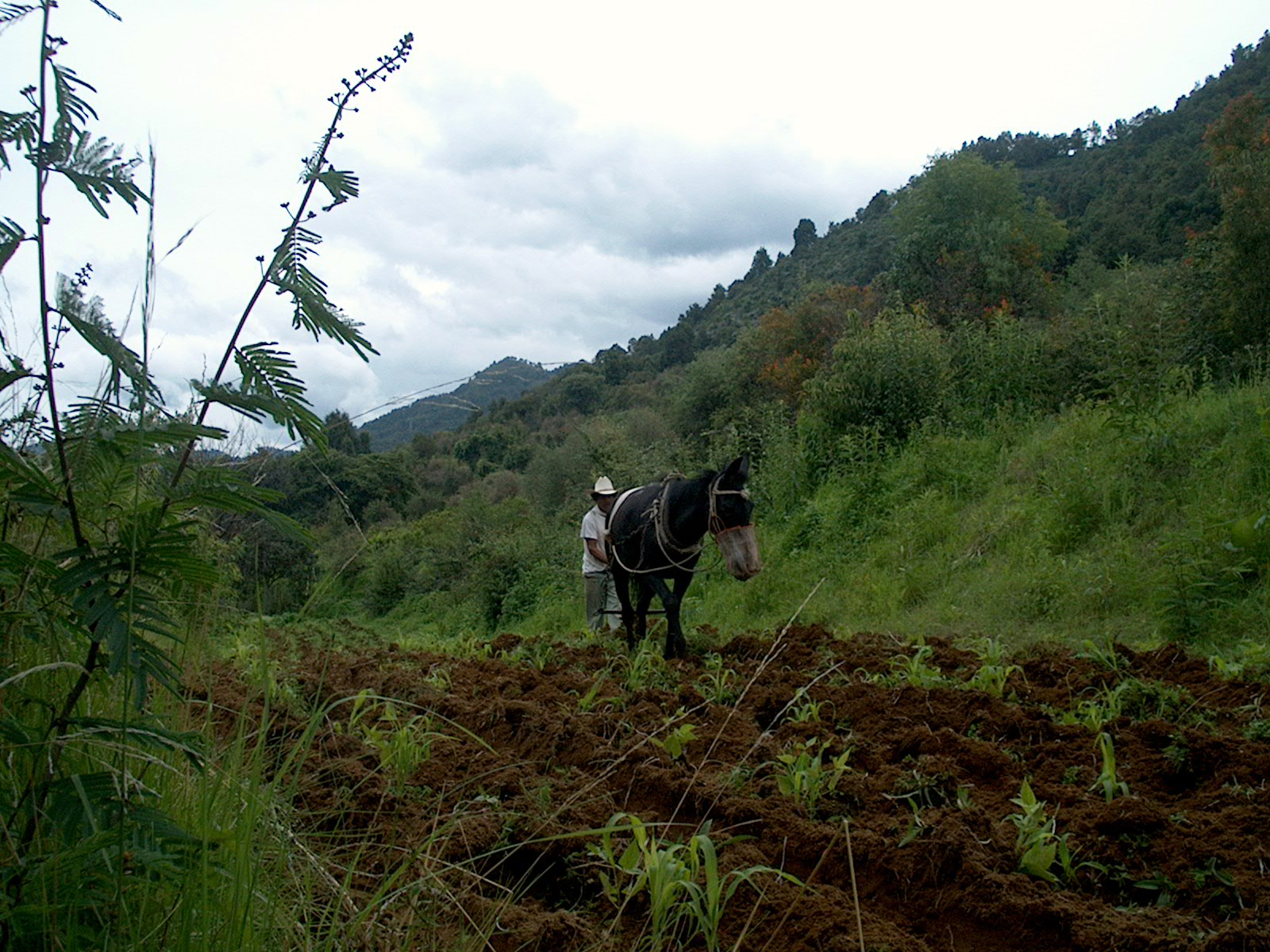
Nahua man of Morelos ploughing a bean field by mule

Total number of Nahuatl speakers in the 2020 Mexican Census
Language	Total persons 3 years & older speaking an Indigenous language	% of total Indigenous speakers 3 years & older in Mexico	Total Indigenous speakers 3 years & older who do not speak Spanish	Monolingual rate (%)
Náhuatl	1,651,958	22.4%	111,797	6.8%

Speakers over 5 years of age in the ten states with most speakers (2000 census). Absolute and relative numbers.
Region	Totals	Percentages
Federal District	37,450	0.44%
Guerrero	136,681	4.44%
Hidalgo	221,684	9.92%
Mexico (state)	55,802	0.43%
Morelos	18,656	1.20%
Oaxaca	10,979	0.32%
Puebla	416,968	8.21%
San Luis Potosí	138,523	6.02%
Tlaxcala	23,737	2.47%
Veracruz	338,324	4.90%
Rest of Mexico	50,132	0.10%
Total:	1,448,937	1.49%

The Mexican government does not categorize its citizens by ethnicity, but only by language. Statistical information recorded about the Nahua deals only with speakers of the Nahuatl language, although unknown numbers of people of Nahua ethnicity have abandoned the language and now speak only Spanish. Other Nahuas, though bilingual in Nahuatl and Spanish, seek to avoid widespread anti-Indigenous discrimination by declining to self-identify as Nahua in INEGI's decennial census. Nor does the census count as Indigenous children under 5 (estimated to be 11–12% of the Indigenous population). An INI-Conepo report indicates the Mexican Indigenous population is nearly 250% greater than that reported by INEGI.

As of 2020, Nahuatl is spoken across Mexico by an estimated 1.6 million people, including 111,797 monolingual speakers. This is an increase from 1.4 million people speakers total but a decrease from 190,000 monolingual speakers in 2000. The state of Guerrero had the highest ratio of monolingual Nahuatl speakers, calculated at 24.8%, based on 2000 census figures. The proportion of monolinguals for most other states is less than 5%.

The largest concentrations of Nahuatl speakers are found in the states of Puebla, Veracruz, Hidalgo, San Luis Potosí, and Guerrero. Significant populations are also found in México State, Morelos, and Mexico City, with smaller communities in Michoacán and Durango. Nahuatl was formerly spoken in the states of Jalisco and Colima, where it became extinct during the 20th century. As a result of internal migrations within the country, all Mexican states today have some isolated pockets and groups of Nahuatl speakers. The modern influx of Mexican workers and families into the United States has resulted in the establishment of a few small Nahuatl-speaking communities, particularly in Texas, New York and California.

64.3% of Nahuatl speakers are literate in Spanish compared with the national average of 97.5% for Spanish literacy. Male Nahuatl speakers have 9.8 years of education on average and women 10.1, compared with the 13.6 and 14.1 years that are the national averages for men and women, respectively.

=== In Central America ===
In El Salvador, the 2024 census counted 29,445 Nahuas/Pipiles. However, some Indigenous organizations claim that the real population is significantly higher. Their Nawat language is endangered, but undergoing a revival.

In Nicaragua, the International Work Group for Indigenous Affairs counted 20,000 Nahuas/Nicaraos in 2022. The International Labour Organization also counted 20,000 Nicaraos. However, DNA analysis has proven that the Nahua admixture in the modern Nicaraguan gene pool is high, especially among western Nicaraguans, both whites and Mestizos alike, making the number of Nahua descendants much higher. Fully Indigenous Nahuas can be found all over the western half of Nicaragua. They also spoke the Nawat language before it became critically endangered in Nicaragua in the late 1800s.

In Costa Rica, a small population of Nahuas inhabit Bagaces and other parts of Guanacaste province. They are descended from Nicaraos who migrated and displaced the Huetares who originally inhabited Bagaces. They spoke the Nawat language before it went extinct in Costa Rica.

In Honduras, different sources give estimates of 6,339 persons of Nahua ethnicity. They are concentrated in Olancho, in the municipalities of Catacamas, Gualaco, Guata, Jano and Esquipulas del Norte. Nawat is extinct here. However, unlike the Nahuas of El Salvador, Nicaragua, and Costa Rica who fled central and southern Mexico during the post-classical era due to famine, societal collapse, civil wars, and invasions from enemy forces, the Nahuas of Olancho are descended from pochtecas who were sent to Central America by Ahuizotl of Tenochtitlan at the start of the modern era in 1501 CE to establish trade relations with the Indigenous peoples of Central America. There were some Nahua communities in other parts of Honduras in the 16th century, but they have since disappeared.

== Geography ==
Number of Nahuatl speakers per state, according to the 2000 Mexican census

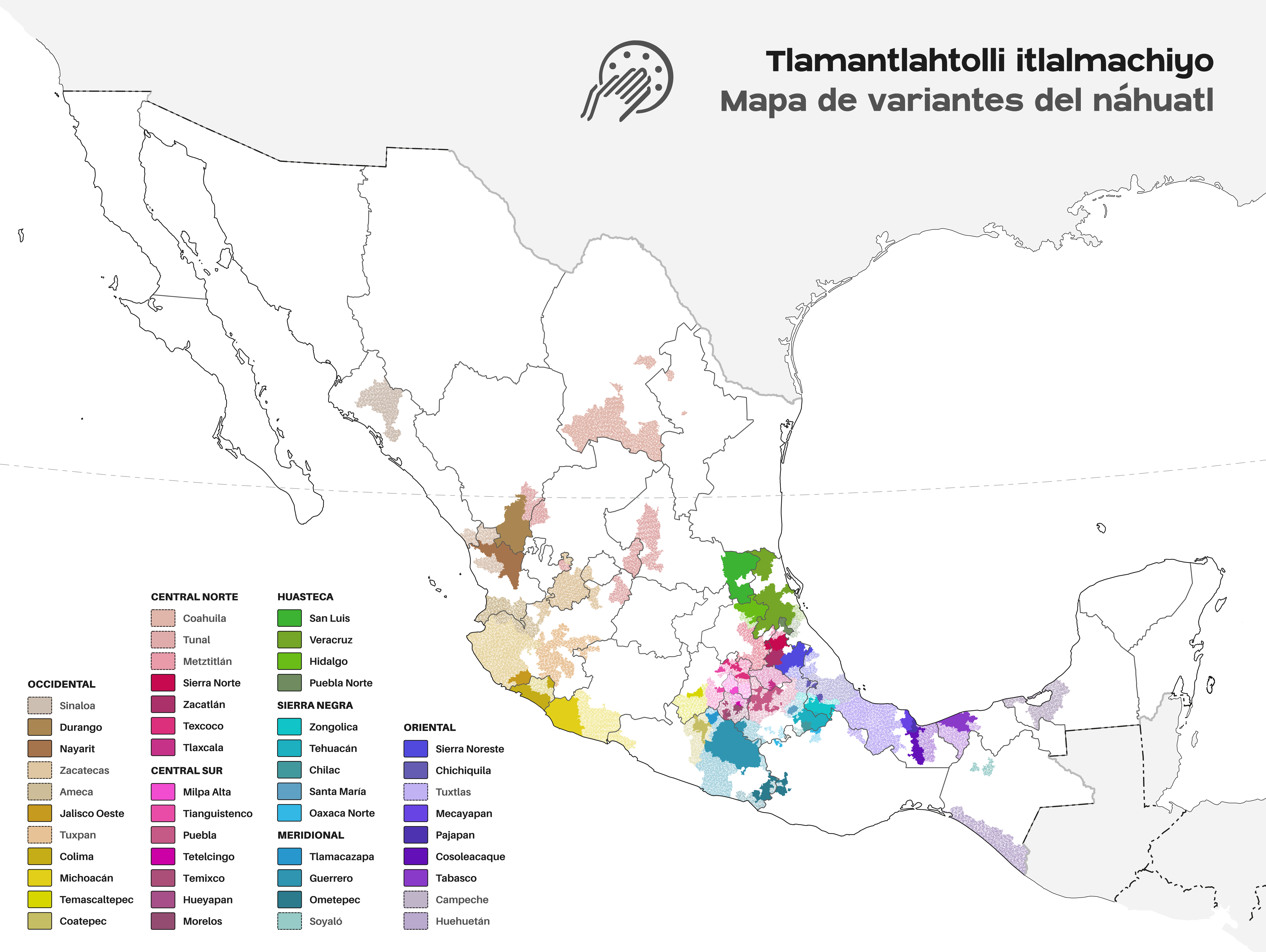
Current and historical distribution of Nahuatl variants

At the turn of the 16th century, Nahua populations occupied territories ranging across Mesoamerica as far south as Panama. However, their core area was Central Mexico, including the Valley of Mexico, the Toluca Valley, the eastern half of the Balsas River basin, and modern-day Tlaxcala and most of Puebla, although other linguistic and ethnic groups lived in these areas as well. They were also present in large numbers in El Salvador, Honduras, Nicaragua, southeastern Veracruz, and Colima and coastal Michoacan. Classical Nahuatl was a lingua franca in Central Mexico before the Spanish conquest due to Aztec hegemony, and its role was not only preserved but expanded in the initial stage of colonial rule, encouraged by the Spaniards as a literary language and tool to convert diverse Mesoamerican peoples. There are many Nahuatl place names in regions where Nahuas were not the most populous group (including the names of Guatemala and several Mexican states), due to Aztec expansion, Spanish invasions in which Tlaxcaltecs served as the main force, and the usage of Nahuatl as a lingua franca.

The last of the southern Nahua populations today are the Pipil of El Salvador, the Nahua of Honduras and the Nicarao of Nicaragua. Nahua populations in Mexico are centered in the middle of the country, with most speakers in the states of Puebla, Veracruz, Hidalgo, Guerrero and San Luis Potosí. However, smaller populations are spread throughout the country due to recent population movements within Mexico. Within the last 50 years, Nahua populations have appeared in the United States, particularly in New York City, Los Angeles, and Houston.

== History ==
=== Pre-conquest period ===
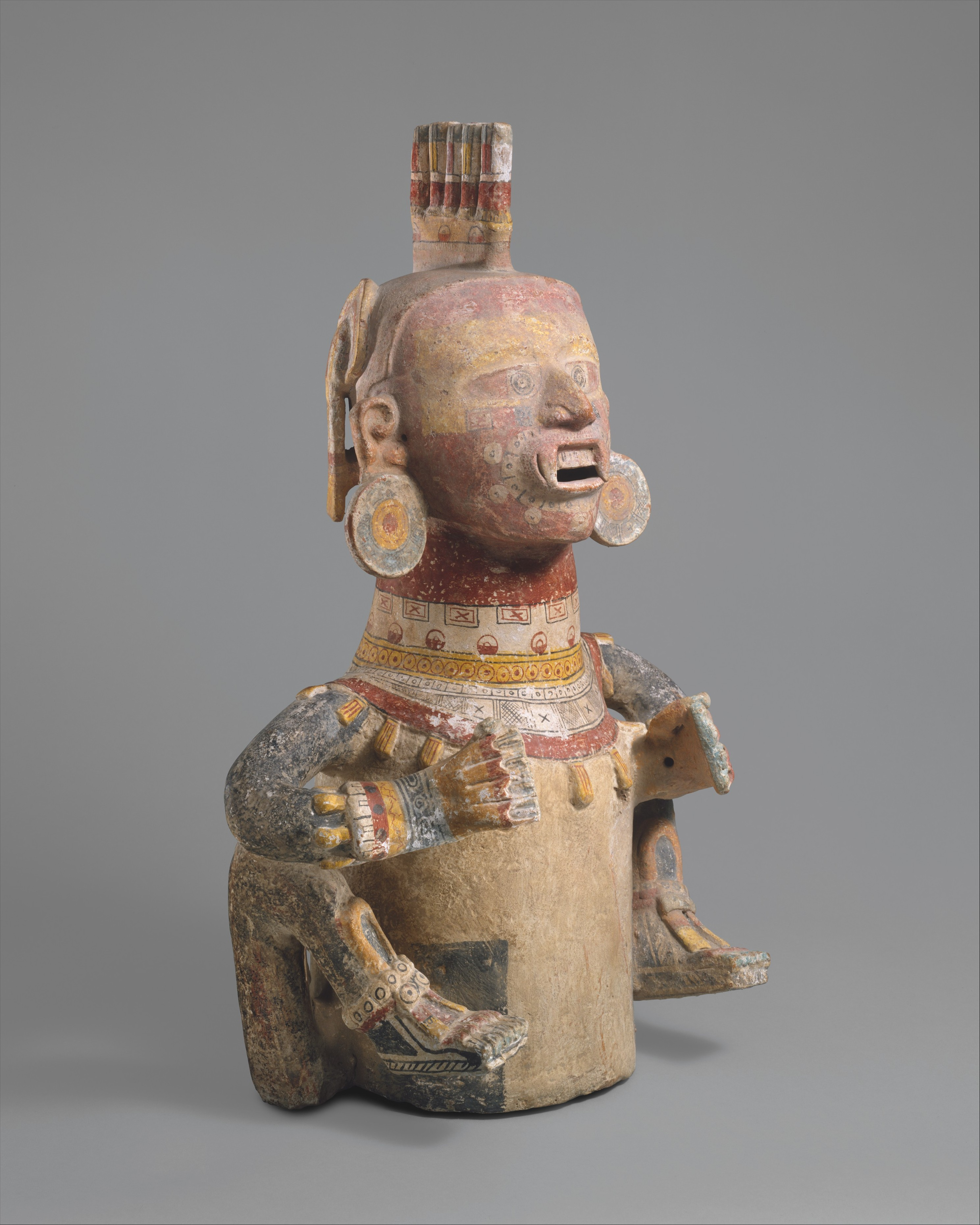
Ceramic sculpture of Nahua deity from Puebla

Archaeological, historical and linguistic evidence suggest that the Nahuas originally came from the deserts of northern Mexico (Aridoamerica) and migrated into central Mexico in several waves. The presence of the Mexicanero people (who speak a Nahuatl variant) in this area until the present day affirms this theory. Before the Nahuas entered Mesoamerica, they were probably living for a period of time in northwestern Mexico alongside the Cora and Huichol peoples. The first group of Nahuas to split from the main group were the Pochutec who went on to settle on the Pacific coast of Oaxaca possibly as early as 400 CE. From c. 600 CE the Nahua quickly rose to power in central Mexico and expanded into areas earlier occupied by Oto-Manguean, Totonacan and Huastec peoples. Through their integration in the Mesoamerican cultural area the Nahuas adopted many cultural traits including maize agriculture and urbanism, religious practices including a ritual calendar of 260 days and the practice of human sacrifices and the construction of monumental architecture and the use of logographic writing.

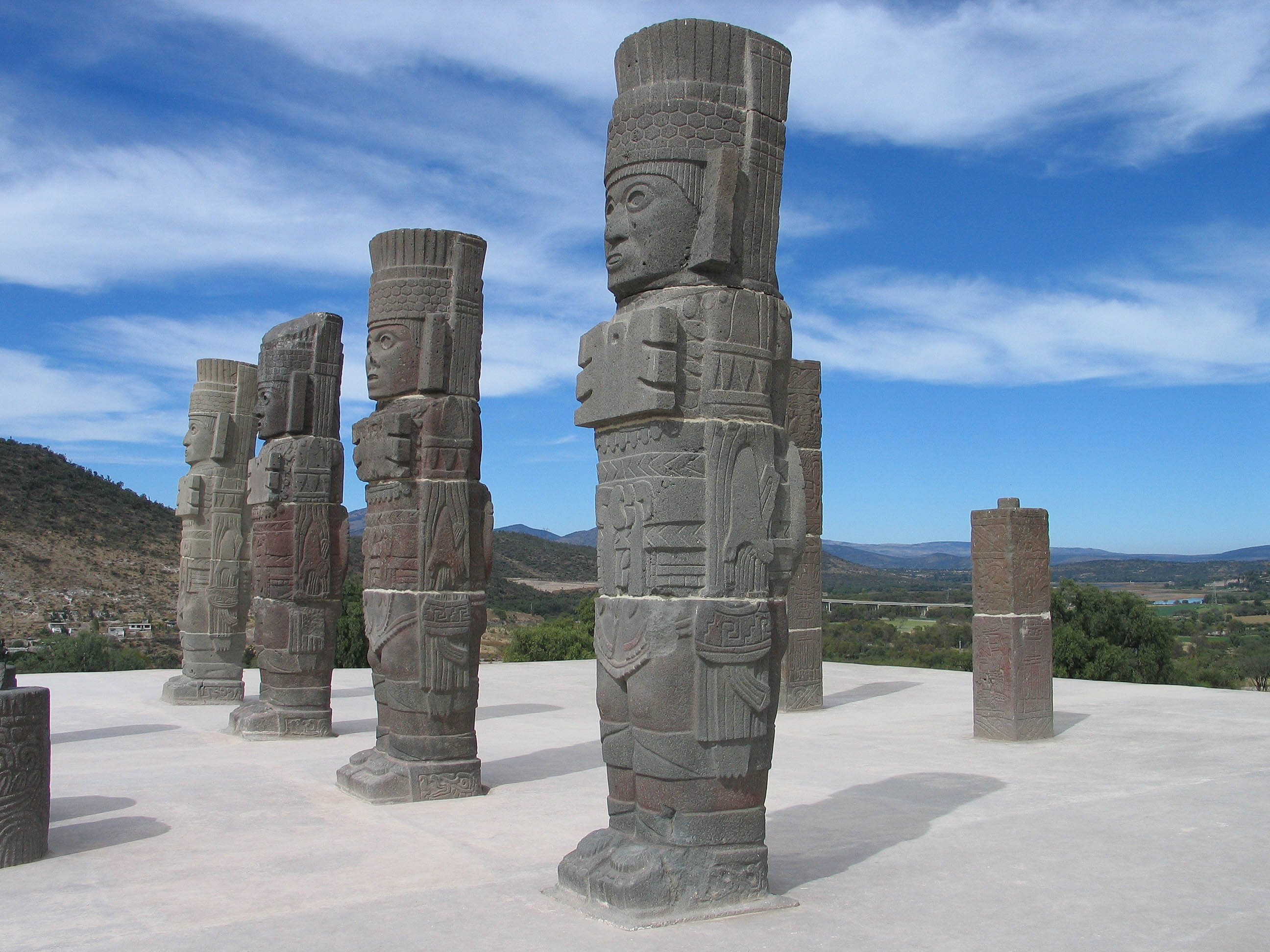
"Atlantean figures" from the Nahua culture of the Toltecs at Tula

Around 1000 CE the Toltec people, normally assumed to have been of Nahua ethnicity, established dominion over much of central Mexico which they ruled from Tollan Xicocotitlan.

From this period on the Nahua were the dominant ethnic group in the Valley of Mexico and far beyond, and migrations kept coming in from the north. After the fall of the Toltecs a period of large population movements followed and some Nahua groups such as the Pipil and Nicarao arrived as far south as northwestern Costa Rica. And in central Mexico different Nahua groups based in their different "Altepetl" city-states fought for political dominance. The Xochimilca, based in Xochimilco ruled an area south of Lake Texcoco; the Tepanecs ruled the area to the west and the Acolhua ruled an area to the east of the valley. One of the last of the Nahua migrations to arrive in the valley settled on an island in the Lake Texcoco and proceeded to subjugate the surrounding tribes. This group were the Mexica who during the next 300 years became the dominant ethnic group of Mesoamerica ruling from Tenochtitlan their island capital. They formed the Aztec Empire after allying with the Tepanecs and Acolhua people of Texcoco, spreading the political and linguistic influence of the Nahuas well into Central America.

=== Conquest period (1519–1523) ===
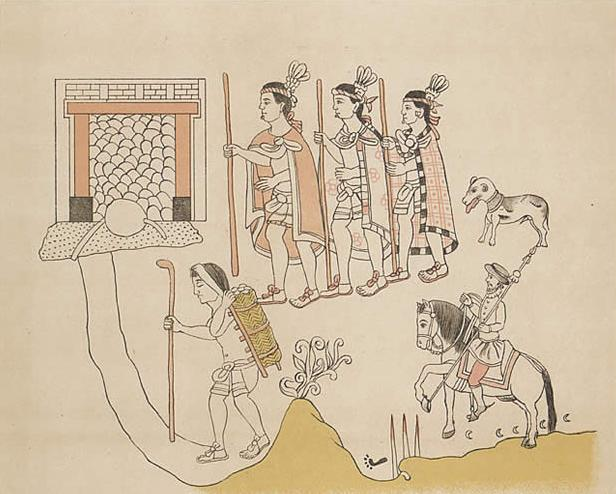
Depiction of Tlaxcaltec soldiers leading a Spaniard to Chalco from Lienzo de Tlaxcala

In 1519 an expedition of Spaniards sailing from Cuba under the leadership of Hernán Cortés arrived on the Mexican gulf coast near the Totonac city of Quiyahuiztlan. The Totonacs were one of the peoples that were politically subjugated by the Aztecs and word was immediately sent to the Aztec Emperor (in Nahuatl, Tlatoani) of Tenochtitlan Motecuhzoma II. Going inland the Spaniards encountered and fought with Totonac forces and Nahua forces from the independent Altepetl of Tlaxcallan. The Tlaxcaltecs were a Nahua group who had avoided being subjugated by the Aztecs. After being defeated in battle by the Spaniards, the Tlaxcalans entered into an alliance with Cortes that would be invaluable in the struggle against the Aztecs. The Spanish and Tlaxcaltec forces marched upon several cities that were under Aztec dominion and "liberated" them, before they arrived in the Aztec capital of Tenochtitlan. There they were welcomed as guests by Motecuhzoma II, but after a while they took the ruler prisoner. When the Aztec nobility realized that their ruler had been turned into a Spanish puppet they attacked the Spaniards and chased them out of the city. The Spaniards sought refuge in Tlaxcala where they regrouped and awaited reinforcements. During the next year they cooperated with large Tlaxcaltec armies and undertook a siege campaign resulting in the final fall of Tenochtitlan. After the fall of Tenochtitlan Spanish forces now also allied with the Aztecs to incorporate all the previous Aztec provinces into the realm of New Spain. New Spain was founded as a state under Spanish rule but where Nahua people were recognized as allies of the rulers and as such were granted privileges and a degree of independence that other Indigenous peoples of the area did not enjoy. Recently historians such as Stephanie Wood and Matthew Restall have argued that the Nahua did not experience the conquest as something substantially different from the sort of ethnic conflicts that they were used to, and that in fact they may have at first interpreted it as a defeat of one Nahua group by another.

=== Colonial period (1521–1821) ===
With the arrival of the Spanish in Mesoamerica a new political situation ensued. The period has been extensively studied by historians, with Charles Gibson publishing a classic monograph entitled The Aztecs Under Spanish Rule. Historian James Lockhart built on that work, publishing The Nahuas After the Conquest in 1992. He divides the colonial history of the Nahua into three stages largely based on linguistic evidence in local-level Nahuatl sources, which he posits are an index of the degree of interaction between Spaniards and Nahuas and changes in Nahua culture. An overview of the Nahuas of colonial Central Mexico can be found in the Cambridge History of the Native Peoples of the Americas.

==== Stage one (1519–c. 1550) Conquest and early colonial period ====
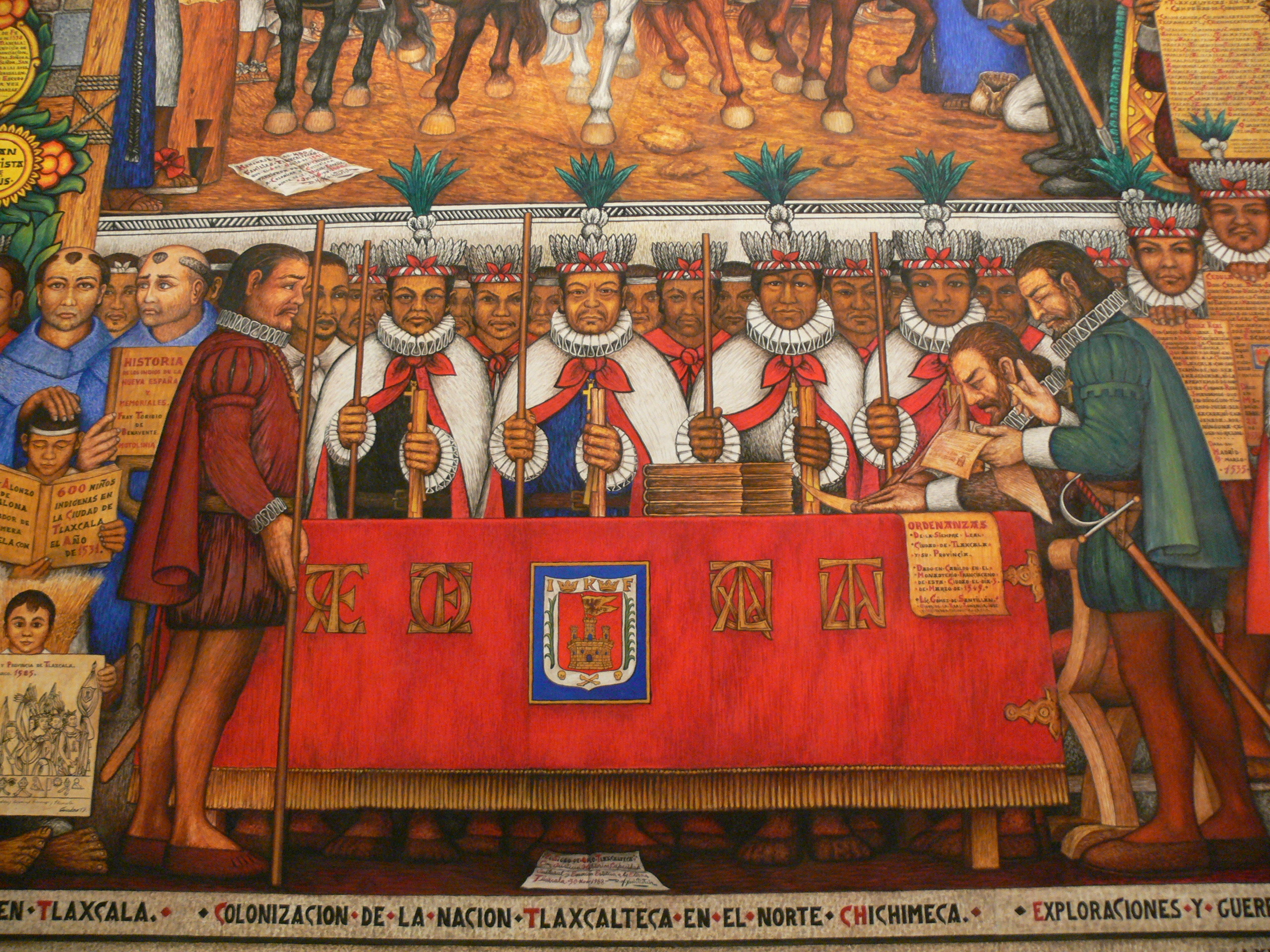
Depiction of Tlaxcaltecs and Spanish at the founding of the Colonial Province of Tlaxcala in 1545

The early period saw the first stages of the establishment of churches by mendicant friars in large and important Indigenous towns, the assertion of crown control over New Spain by the high court (Audiencia) and then the establishment of the viceroyalty, and the heyday of conqueror power over the Indigenous via the encomienda. In the initial stage of the colonial period, contact between Spaniards and the Indigenous populations was limited. It consisted mostly in the mendicants who sought to convert the population to Catholicism, and the reorganization of the Indigenous tributary system to benefit individual Spaniards. The Indigenous system of smaller settlements' paying tribute and rendering labor service to dominant political entities was transformed into the Encomienda system. Indigenous of particular towns paid tribute to a Spanish encomendero who was awarded the labor and tribute of that town. In this early period, the hereditary Indigenous ruler or tlatoani and noblemen continued to hold power locally and were key to mobilizing tribute and labor for encomenderos. They also continued to hold titles from the pre-conquest period. Most willing accepted baptism so that records for this period show Nahua elites with Christian given names (indicating baptism) and many holding the Spanish noble title don. A set of censuses in alphabetic Nahuatl for the Cuernavaca region c. 1535 gives us a baseline for the impact of Spanish on Nahuatl, showing few Spanish loanwords taken into Nahuatl.

As the Spaniards sought to extend their political dominance into the most remote corners of Mesoamerica, the Nahua accompanied them as auxiliaries. In the early colonial period, new Nahua settlements were made in northern Mexico and far south into Central America. Nahua forces often formed the bulk of the Spanish military expeditions that conquered other Mesoamerican peoples, such as the Maya, Zapotecs, and Mixtecs.

With the arrival of Christian missionaries, the first priority of the colonial authorities was eradicating Indigenous religious practices, something they achieved by a combination of violence and threats of violence, and patient education. Nahua were baptized with Spanish names. The Nahua who did not abandon their religious practices were severely punished or executed. The Nahua, however, often incorporated pre-Christian practices and beliefs into the Christian religion without the authorities' noticing it. Often they kept practicing their own religion in the privacy of their homes, especially in rural areas where Spanish presence was almost completely lacking and the conversion process was slow.

The Nahua quickly took the Latin alphabetic writing as their own. Within 20 years of the arrival of the Spanish, the Nahua were composing texts in their own language. In 1536 the first university of the Americas, the Colegio de Santa Cruz de Tlatelolco was inaugurated. It was established by the Franciscans whose aim was to educate young Nahua noblemen to be Catholic priests who are multilingual: literate and too fluent in with Spanish, Latin, Maya, Nahuatl and or too, Zapotec.

==== Stage two (c. 1550 – c. 1650) ====
There are a large number of texts by and about Nahuas in this middle period and during this period Nahuatl absorbed a large number of loanwords from Spanish, particularly nouns for particular objects, indicating the closer contact between the European sphere and the Indigenous. However, Nahuatl verbs and syntax show no evidence of the impact of Spanish contact. In the mid-sixteenth century, cultural change at the local level can be tracked through the production of Nahuatl alphabetic texts. The production of a wide range of written documents in Nahuatl dates from this period, including legal documents for transactions (bills of sale), minutes of Indigenous town council (cabildo) records, petitions to the crown, and others.

Institutionally, Indigenous town government shifted from the rule of the tlatoani and noblemen to the establishment of Spanish-style town councils (cabildos), with officers holding standard Spanish titles. A classic study of sixteenth-century Tlaxcala, the main ally of the Spaniards in the conquest of the Mexica, shows that much of the prehispanic structure continued into the colonial period. An important set of cabildo records in Nahuatl for Tlaxcala is extant and shows how local government functioned in for nearly a century.

Regarding religion, by the mid- to late 16th century, even the most zealous mendicants of the first generation doubted the capacity of Nahua men to become Christian priests so that the Colegio de Santa Cruz de Tlatelolco ceased to function to that end and in 1555 Indians were barred from ordination to the priesthood. However, in local communities, stone-built church complexes continued to be built and elaborated, with murals in mixed Indigenous-Spanish forms. Confraternities (cofradías) were established to support the celebrations of a particular Christian saint and functioned as burial societies for members. During this period, an expression of personal piety, the Church promoted the making of last wills and testaments, with many testators donating money to their local Church to say Masses for their souls.

For individual Nahua men and women dictating a last will and testament to a local Nahua notary (escribano) became standard. These wills provide considerable information about individuals' residence, kin relations, and property ownership provides a window into social standing, differences between the sexes, and business practices at the local level. showing not only that literacy of some elite men in alphabetic writing in Nahuatl was a normal part of everyday life at the local level and that the notion of making a final will was expected, even for those who had little property. A number of studies in the tradition of what is now called the New Philology extensively use Nahuatl wills as a source.

==== Stage three (c. 1650 – 1821) Late colonial period to independence ====
From the mid-seventeenth century to the achievement of independence in 1821, Nahuatl shows considerable impact from the European sphere and a full range of bilingualism. Texts produced at the local level that in the late sixteenth and early seventeenth centuries were sometimes a mixture of pictorial and alphabetic forms of expression were now primarily alphabetic. In the late eighteenth century, there is evidence of text being written in "Nahuatlized Spanish", written by Nahuas who were now communicating in their own form of Spanish. Year-by-year accounts of major occurrences, a text known as an annal, no longer reference the prehispanic period. Local level documentation for individual Nahuas continued to be produced, in particular last wills and testaments, but they are much more simplified than those produced in the late sixteenth century.

Nahuas began to produce an entirely new type of text, known as "primordial titles" or simply "titles" (títulos), that assert Indigenous communities' rights to particular territory, often by recording local lore in an atemporal fashion. There is no known prehispanic precedent for this textual form and none appears before 1650. Several factors might be at work for the appearance of titles. One might be a resurgence of Indigenous population after decades recovering from devastating epidemics when communities might have been less concerned with Spanish encroachment. Another might be the crown's push to regularize defective land titles via a process known as composición. The crown had mandated minimum land holdings for Indigenous communities at 600 varas, in property that was known as the fundo legal, and to separate Indigenous communities from Spanish lands by more than 1,100 varas. Towns were to have access to water, uplands for gathering firewood, and agricultural land, as well as common lands for pasturage. Despite these mandated legal protections for Indian towns, courts continued to find in favor of Spaniards and the rules about minimum holdings for Indian towns were ignored in practice.

Labor arrangements between Nahuas and Spaniards were largely informal, rather than organized through the mainly defunct encomienda and the poorly functioning repartimiento. Spanish landed estates needed a secure labor force, often a mixture of a small group of permanent laborers and part-time or seasonal laborers drawn from nearby Indigenous communities. Individual Indians made arrangements with estate owners rather than labor being mobilized via the community. The Indigenous communities continued to function as political entities, but there was greater fragmentation of units as dependent villages (sujetos) of the main settlement (cabecera) sought full, independent status themselves. Indigenous officials were no longer necessarily noblemen.

=== National period (1821–present) ===
With the achievement of Mexican independence in 1821, the casta system, which divided the population into racial categories with differential rights, was eliminated and the term "Indian" (indio) was no longer used by government, although it continued to be used in daily speech. The creation of a republic in 1824 meant that Mexicans of all types were citizens rather than vassals of the crown. One important consequence for Nahua people and other Indigenous people was that documentation in the native languages generally ceased to be produced. Indigenous towns did not cease to exist nor did Indigenous populations speaking their own language, but the Indigenous people were far more marginalized in the post-independence period than during the colonial era. In the colonial era the crown had a paternalistic stance toward the Indigenous people, in essence according them special rights, a fuero, and giving support to structures in Indigenous towns and giving Indigenous people a level of protection against those who were not Indigenous. This can be seen in the establishment of the General Indian Court where Indigenous towns and individual Indigenous people could sue those making incursions on their land and other abuses. These protections disappeared in the national period. One scholar has characterized the early national period of Nahua people and other Indigenous people "as the beginning of a systematic policy of cultural genocide and the increasing loss of native languages." Lack of official recognition and both economic and cultural pressures meant that most Indigenous peoples in Central Mexico became more Europeanized and many became Spanish speakers.

In 19th-century Mexico, the so-called "Indian Question" exercised politicians and intellectuals, who viewed Indigenous people as backward, unassimilated to the Mexican nation, whose custom of communal rather than individual ownership of land was impediment to economic progress. Non-Indigenous landowners of estates had already encroached on Indigenous ownership in the colonial era, but now liberal ideology sought to end communal protections on ownership with its emphasis on private property. Since land was the basis for Indigenous peoples'ability to maintain a separate identity, and a sense of sovereignty, land tenure became a central issue for liberal reformers. The liberal Reforma enshrined in the Constitution of 1857 mandated the breakup of corporate-owned property, therefore targeting Indigenous communities and the Roman Catholic Church, which also had significant holdings. This measure affected all Indigenous communities, including Nahua communities, holding land. Liberal Benito Juárez, a Zapotec who became president of Mexico, was fully in support of laws to end corporate landholding. The outbreak of the Mexican Revolution in Morelos, which still had a significant Nahua population, was sparked by peasant resistance to the expansion of sugar estates. This was preceded in the nineteenth century by smaller Indigenous revolts against encroachment, particularly during the civil war of the Reforma, foreign intervention, and a weak state following the exit of the French in 1867.

A number of Indigenous men had made a place for themselves in post-independence Mexico, the most prominent being Benito Juárez. But an important nineteenth-century figure of Nahua was Ignacio Manuel Altamirano (1834–1893), born in Tixtla, Guerrero who became a well respected liberal intellectual, man of letters, politician, and diplomat. Altamirano was a fierce anticlerical politician, and was known for a period as "the Marat of the Radicals" and an admirer of the French Revolution. Altamirano, along with other liberals, saw universal primary public education as a key way to change Mexico, promoting for upward mobility. Altamirano's chief disciple in this view was Justo Sierra. Another prominent Nahua figure of this period was Prospero Cahuantzi, who served as governor of Tlaxcala from 1885 to 1911. Indigenous surnames were uncommon in post-colonial Mexico but prevalent in Tlaxcala due to certain protections granted by the Spanish government in return for Tlaxcallan support during the overthrow of the Aztecs. Cahuantzi was active in promoting the preservation of Indigenous culture and artifacts at a time when Mexican government policy was generally that of suppression.

The Mexican revolutionary Emiliano Zapata (1879–1919) was likely of mixed Nahua-Spanish heritage, with ancestry going back to the Nahua city of Mapaztlán, in the state of Morelos. Zapata was evidently fluent in Nahuatl and would give speeches in the language to Nahua population in hopes of inspiring them to join his cause.

== Culture ==
=== Economy ===
Many Nahua are agriculturists. They practice various forms of cultivation including the use of horses or mules to plow or slash-and-burn. Common crops include corn, wheat, beans, barley, chilli peppers, onions, tomatoes, and squash. Some Nahuas also raise sheep and cattle. Additionally, Nahua and other tribal communities in Mexico harvest copal for ceremonial use and to sell.

=== Language ===
The language and variants traditionally spoken by the Nahuas form the Nahuan language group, which includes the different dialects of Nahuatl and the Nawat language.

=== Dances ===
Netotiliztli, Danza de las Inditas, Danza de los Matachines, Danza de los Negritos, Danza de los Viejitos
