= La Muralla National Park =

National park in Honduras

- IUCN category II (national park)
- Location within Honduras
- Location: La Unión, Olancho, Honduras
- Coordinates: 15°08′23″N 86°40′12″W
- Area: 210.35 km^{2} (81.22 sq mi)
- Established: 1 January 1993

La Muralla National Park is a national park in Honduras. It was established on 1 January 1993. and covers an area of approximately 13,708.35 ha and a buffer zone of 13,195.05 ha for a total area of 26,903.48 ha.

The park is part of three municipalities of the Department of Olancho, Honduras. Approximately 80% of the park is located in La Unión, with approximately 10% in Jano and Esquipulas del Norte, respectively.

== Recent history ==
La Muralla was designated a national park in January 1993, but like many national parks in Honduras it has struggled to maintain the protected area due to lack of government support. Shortly after its creation a community group Organization for the Protection of National Park La Muralla (OPMA) was created, but has since stopped functioning for lack of financial support. On April 23, 2002 the Association of Community Services Union (ASECUN) was founded and is currently providing community support for La Muralla and other environmental projects.

Other players involved in the protection and maintenance of the park include:

- Institute of Forestry Conservation for the government of Honduras (ICF)
- PANAM Foundation
- Project for Forests and Rural Productivity (PBPR)
- The Nature Conservancy (TNC)

== Biodiversity ==
The first studies of biodiversity in La Muralla were conducted by the Forestry Conservation Project of Honduras (CONSEFORH) in 1992. A total of 101 plants were identified, including melastome families, Lauraceae, Pasiflorácea and Solanaceae. In 2001, the Paseo Pantera project cataloged 859 species of plants, including the previously recorded 101, corresponding to 410 genera and 127 botanical families.

The biggest impact of this study was the addition 65 new species not yet registered, and three new genera of plants which are endemic to Honduras: Bartlettina williamsii, Saurauia molinae, and Tetrorchirium molinae.

== Orchids ==
There are currently 123 species of orchids found in La Muralla. In 2010, Dr. Dora Elisa Perez conducted a study with the discovery of 53 new varieties cataloged.
