= La Unión, Olancho =

La Unión
- Municipality
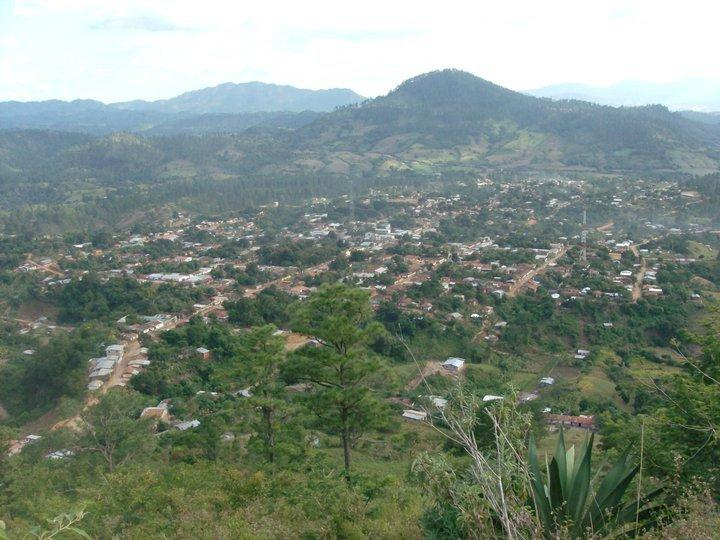
- Panoramic view

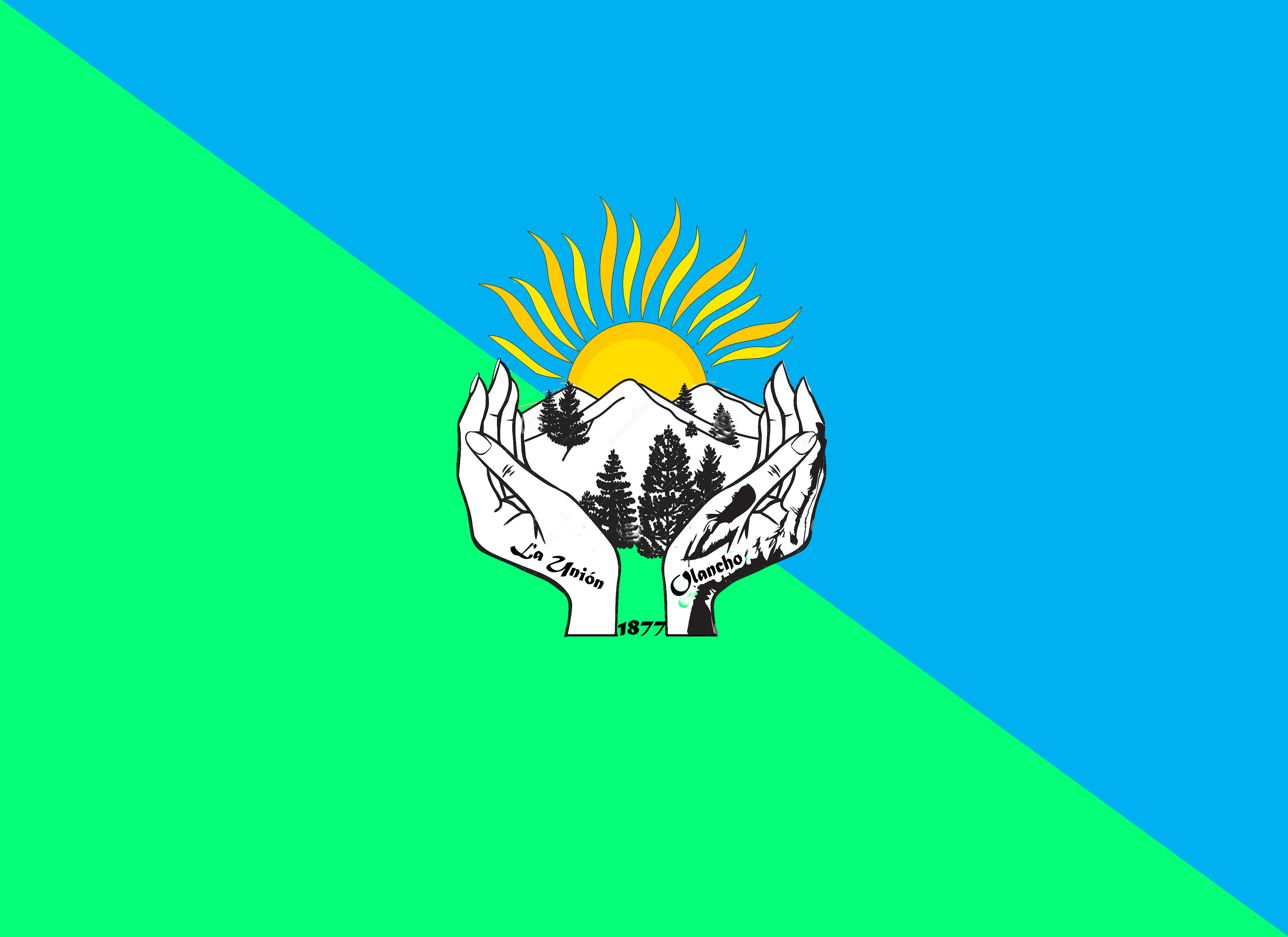
- Flag

- Location within Honduras
- Coordinates: 15°2′N 86°43′W
- Country: Honduras
- Department: Olancho
- Villages: 11
- Founded: 1877

Government
  - Alcalde Municipal: Dolores Olimpia Almendarez Martinez

Area
  - Total: 556 km^{2} (215 sq mi)

Population (2015)
  - Total: 7,861
  - Density: 14.1/km^{2} (36.6/sq mi)
- Time zone: UTC-6
- Climate: Aw

La Unión is a municipality in the northwest of the Olancho Department of Honduras.

== History ==
=== Early history ===
La Unión was elevated to municipality status in 1877 and was part of the District of Salamá.

As early as 1852, there was a village called San Francisco de Yocón, which was burned by guerrillas under the command of General José María Medina, who became President of Honduras in 1868. In that time he encouraged a civil war in the Department of Olancho, a product of the intentions of separating this department in an independent republic by its inhabitants in retaliation for the high taxes that the government asked of it from Comayagua (Tithes of Olancho).

Between the years 1876–1883 La Unión was reestablished by decree from President Marco Aurelio Soto. The first houses were those of Mrs. Mary Dilia Vivas, Ms. Paula Almendares, and Lady Camilla Cruz.

The municipality's urban growth was partially because of the regulations that forced the citizens of rural communities near the village that possessed sufficient financial resources to build homes in urban areas, even if they did not live in them. Some families were Los Vargas from farmhouses of El Paraiso, Los Funes of the villages of Palala, Los Zaldivar from the farmshouses of Los Salitres among others.

Among the first mayors to serve La Unión were Mr. Tomas Herrera and Mr. Macario Vargas.

=== Modern history ===
The Catholic Church, dedicated in honour of the patron saint San Francisco de Asis, was founded in 1906. The first telegraph line was installed in 1925 by Mr. Martin Murillo. The first school was founded in 1930 and given the name of Francisco Morazan.

In 1983 a committee composed of parents and others was formed by Mrs. Alejandro Carcamo, Rigoberto Rivera, Eleazar Puerto for the construction of a High School Education Center then called Instituto Privado Nocturno Superacion Franciscana. When the government of President Roberto Suazo Córdova with guidance from the deputy for Olancho, Mr. Alejandro Carcamo, formalised its operation they renamed it Instituto Superacion Franciscana. Its first Director was Professor Victor Almenderez with teachers Noe Menocal, Martin Ramos, Lourdes Padilla and others.

List of mayors of La Unión, in the modern democratic era:

- 1982–1984 Helma Zelaya, originally from San José Choluteca
- 1984–1986 Maria Elena Valle Flores, originally from Yocon
- 1986–1990 Ramon Alcides Torres Castro, originally from Salamá
- 1990–1994 Angel Donaldo Tejeda Menocal, originally from La Unión
- 1994–1998 Carmen Lastenia Padilla Rivera, originally from Yocon
- 1998–2002 Jose Humberto Rivera, originally from Juticalpa
- 2002–2006 Santos Isabel Zelaya Lobo, originally from La Unión
- 2006–2010 Santos Domingo Munguia Matute, originally from Mangulile
- 2010–2014 Yonis Herrera Tejeda, originally from La Unión
- 2014–2018 Renan Alcides Torres Argueta, originally from La Unión
- 2018-2022 Ramón Edgardo Cárcamo Rivera, originally from Tegucigalpa MDC
- 2022-2026 Dolores Olimpia Almendarez Martinez originally from Yocon

== Geography ==
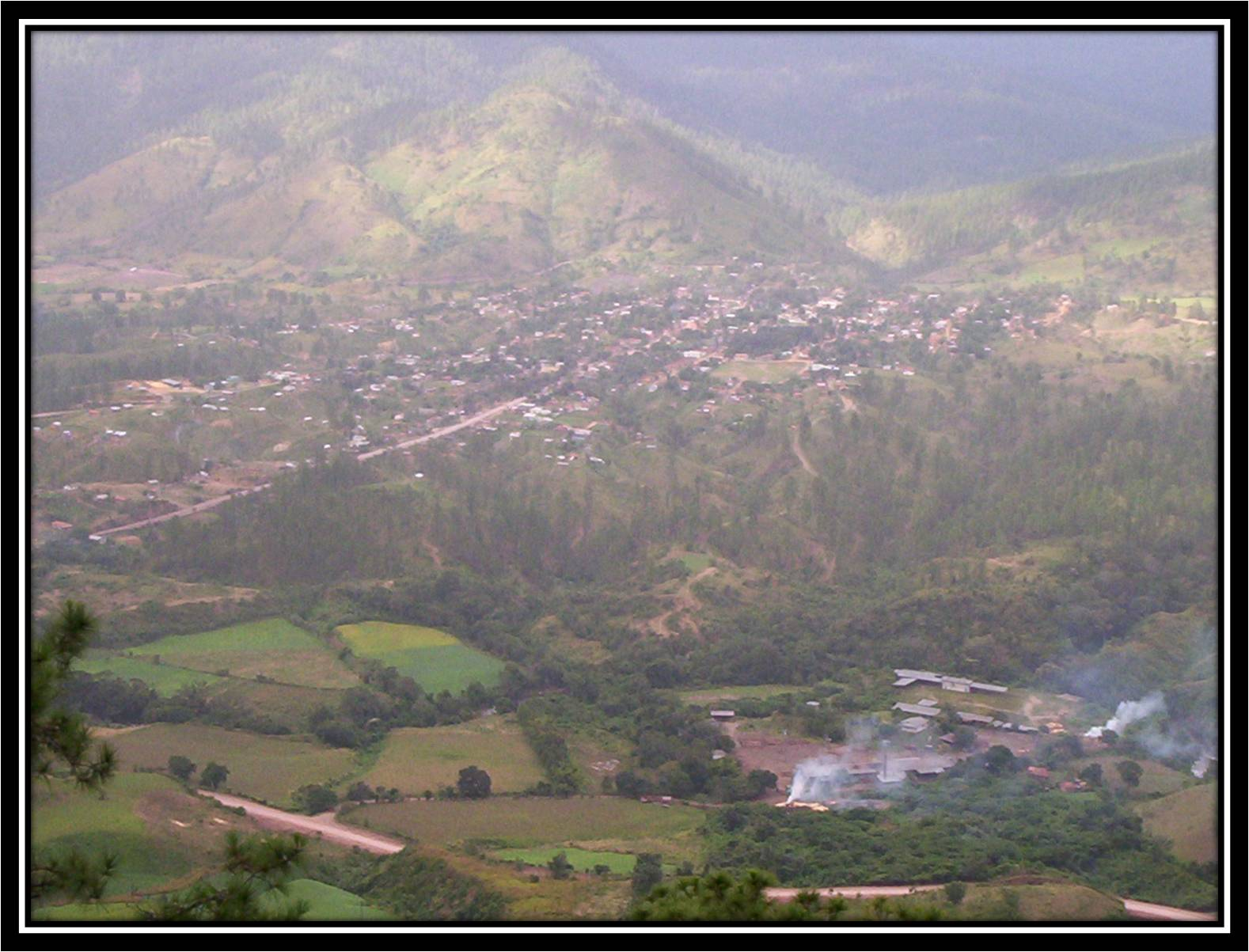
View of La Unión and the surrounding valley

=== Limits ===
La Unión is bounded to the north with Olanchito, to the south with Salamá and El Rosario, to the west with Esquipulas del Norte and Jano and to the east with Yocón and Mangulile. Its capital is located in a flat area near the right bank of the river Camote.

=== Villages ===
The municipality has the following five villages:

- La Unión
- El Díctamo
- Los Encuentros
- Palala
- Guanacaste

The distribution by resolution of the Municipal Corporation is:

El Dictamo Village following the farmhouses in order of population.

- El Junco
- El Empedrado
- El Rio
- La Laguna.

Palala Village following the farmhouses in order of population.

- Paso Real
- Cerro Verde
- Vallecito
- Sabana Grande
- El Cacao
- Timis
- La Leona
- Las Cañas
- La Pita
- Rancho Quemado
- Yuscaran
- El Alto
- El Limoncito

Los Encuentros Village following the farmhouses in order of population.

- El Pacon
- Los Planes
- El Cacao
- El Higueral
- San Francisco
- Los Salitres

El Guanacaste Village following the farmhouse of.

- El Naranjo

== Demographics ==
At the time of the 2013 Honduras census, La Unión municipality had a population of 7,691. Of these, 99.34% were Mestizo, 0.30% Indigenous, 0.26% White, 0.09% Black or Afro-Honduran and 0.01% others.
