= El Rosario, Olancho =

El Rosario
- Municipality
- Location within Honduras
- Coordinates (centroid of municipality): 14°55′N 86°42′W
- Country: Honduras
- Department: Olancho
- Villages: 8

Area
  - Total: 143.11 km^{2} (55.26 sq mi)

Population (2015)
  - Total: 4,265
  - Density: 29.80/km^{2} (77.19/sq mi)

El Rosario (Spanish pronunciation: [el roˈsaɾjo]) is a town (14°54′18″N 86°42′08″W) and a municipality in the west of the Honduran department of Olancho.

It is south-east of Yocón, north-east of Guayape and north-west of Salamá.

The town had a lumber mill, school, clinic, and a public library, La Biblioteca Regional de Dr. Dean J. Seibert.

In 2018, El Rosario experienced drought and failures of the corn and bean crops, as the August rains did not come. Residents have attributed the drought to climate change, and to logging which has depleted the pine forests surrounding the town.

== Demographics ==
At the time of the 2013 Honduras census, El Rosario municipality had a population of 4,224. Of these, 99.48% were Mestizo, 0.31% Black or Afro-Honduran, 0.17% Indigenous and 0.05% White.

== See also ==
- Central American dry corridor
