= Monte Escondido salamander =

Conservation status
- Critically Endangered (IUCN 3.1)

Scientific classification
- Kingdom: Animalia
- Phylum: Chordata
- Class: Amphibia
- Order: Urodela
- Family: Plethodontidae
- Genus: Bolitoglossa
- Species: B. decora

Binomial name
- Bolitoglossa decora McCranie & Wilson, 1997

Species of amphibian

Bolitoglossa decora, the Escondido mushroomtongue salamander, is a species of salamander in the family Plethodontidae. It is a rather large salamander for its genus, with females growing to a snout–vent length of 61–62.1 mm (2.40–2.44 in). It has a bold coloration, with buff-yellow spots on the sides, tail, and underside, contrasting with the amber to burnt umber colored body. It is endemic to the La Muralla National Park Honduras, where it inhabits montane cloud forest at elevations of 1,430–1,550 m (4,690–5,090 ft). It is classified as being critically endangered by the IUCN due to its extremely small range which is facing ongoing habitat degradation.

== Taxonomy ==
Bolitoglossa decora was formally described in 1997 based on an adult female specimen collected from near Monte Escondido in the La Muralla National Park, in central Honduras, in 1996. The species is named after a Latin word meaning 'ornamented' or 'beautiful', referring to the bold coloration the species possess. The species has the English common name Escondido mushroomtongue salamander.

It is placed within the subgenus Magnadigita.

== Description ==
Bolitoglossa decora is a rather large salamander for its genus, with females growing to a snout–vent length of 61–62.1 mm (2.40–2.44 in) and two immature males measuring 36.5–40.2 mm (1.44–1.58 in). It is characterised by an amber to burnt umber colored body with numerous buff-yellow spots on the underwide, tail, and along the sides.

== Distribution and habitat ==
Bolitoglossa decora is endemic to Honduras, where it is found only in the La Muralla National Park in the department of Olancho. It inhabits montane cloud forest at elevations of 1,430–1,550 m (4,690–5,090 ft).

== Conservation ==
Bolitoglossa decora is classified as being critically endangered by the IUCN due to its extremely small range which is facing ongoing habitat degradation. The La Muralla National Park where the species lives is not protected well and deforestation due to agriculture and grazing continues to destroy habitat within the park. Climatic changes driven by climate change may negatively impact the species. Salamander chytrid fungus, a pathogen that has devastated European salamander populations post its 2010 introduction to that continent, has not yet spread to the Americas, but still presents a future threat to the species if it ever spreads to Honduras.
