= Oscar Núñez Oliva =

Costa Rican writer (born 1945)

Oscar Núñez Olivas
- Born: 21 May 1955 (age 71); San José, Costa Rica
- Occupation: Novelist
- Writing career
- Language: Spanish

Oscar Núñez Olivas (born 21 May 1955 in San José) is a Costa Rican novelist who has published seven Spanish-language novels.

== Career ==
His first novel, El Teatro Circular (1996), won the Latin America Novel Prize of Editorial Universitaria Centroamericana (EDUCA) and the national novel prize, the Aquileo J. Echeverría Award, granted by the Costa Rican Ministry of Culture, in 1997.

In 2000, Guaymuras Edit. (Honduras) published his second novel, Los Gallos de San Esteban, a real story developed at the rural village of San Esteban in Olancho, Honduras .

En clave de luna (Uruk Editores, 2004) tells events based on a real story about a serial killer in Costa Rica. An English-language version, entitled Cadence of the Moon, was published in the United Kingdom by Aflame Books in 2007.

La Guerra Prometida (Alfaguara, 2014) is a story which refers to the Costa Rica national struggle against the American filibuster William Walker, who intended to take over Central American countries in the 19th century.

In addition, Nuñez has written two crime novels – Crimen en Calle Paraíso (Uruk, 2022) and Un asesino espurio (Uruk 2024) – as well as a short novel intended for teenagers readers, En busca del gran tesoro, adventures in Coco Island (Editorial La Jirafa y yo, 2016).
