= Guata =

- Municipality
- Location within Honduras
- Coordinates: 15°05′N 86°23′W
- Country: Honduras
- Department: Olancho
- Villages: 6

Area
  - Total: 680.03 km^{2} (262.56 sq mi)

Population (2015)
  - Total: 12,084
  - Density: 17.770/km^{2} (46.024/sq mi)

Guata is a municipality in the north west of the Honduran department of Olancho, west of Gualaco, north of Manto and east of Jano and Esquipulas del Norte.

== Demographics ==
At the time of the 2013 Honduras census, Guata municipality had a population of 11,784. Of these, 93.75% were Mestizo, 2.87% White, 2.21% Indigenous (2.03% Nahua), 0.26% Black or Afro-Honduran and 0.91% others. File:Alcaldia Municipal,Guata,Olancho..jpg
