= Concordia, Honduras =

Concordia
- Municipality
- Location within Honduras
- Coordinates: 14°40′N 86°39′W
- Country: Honduras
- Department: Olancho
- Villages: 11

Area
  - Total: 267.80 km^{2} (103.40 sq mi)

Population (2015)
  - Total: 8,339
  - Density: 31.14/km^{2} (80.65/sq mi)
- Climate: Aw

Concordia (Spanish pronunciation: [koŋˈkoɾðja]) is a municipality in the south west of the Honduran department of Olancho, north of Campamento, west of Juticalpa and south of Guayape and Salamá.

== Demographics ==
At the time of the 2013 Honduras census, Concordia municipality had a population of 8,188. Of these, 96.93% were Mestizo, 2.28% White, 0.64% Black or Afro-Honduran and 0.15% Indigenous.
