= Campamento, Honduras =

Campamento
- Municipality
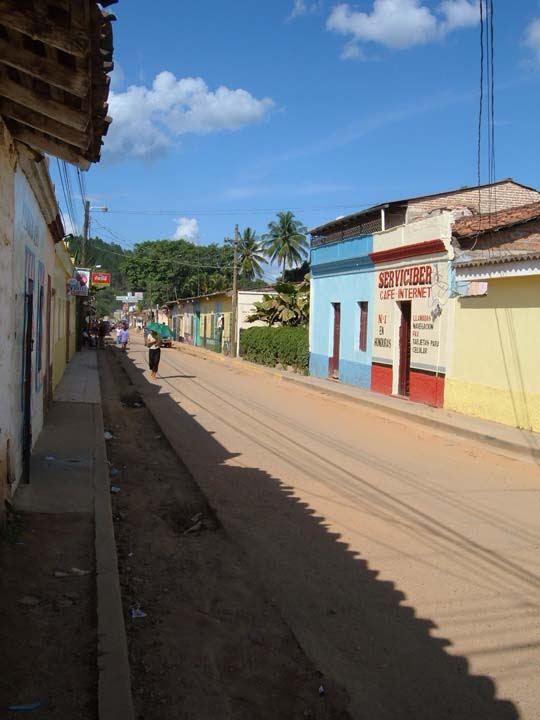

- Location within Honduras
- Coordinates: 14°33′N 86°39′W
- Country: Honduras
- Department: Olancho
- Villages: 10

Area
  - Total: 391.49 km^{2} (151.16 sq mi)

Population (2015)
  - Total: 20,766
  - Density: 53.044/km^{2} (137.38/sq mi)
- Climate: Aw

Campamento is a municipality in the south west of the Honduran department of Olancho, south of Concordia and west of Juticalpa. The municipality of Campamento is located at the entrance to Olancho, along the main highway from Tegucigalpa. The town of Campamento is located near the center of the municipality, just north of the main highway.

== Demographics ==
At the time of the 2013 Honduras census, Campamento municipality had a population of 19,832. Of these, 97.51% were Mestizo, 2.00% White, 0.26% Indigenous, 0.21% Black or Afro-Honduran and 0.03% others.

== Terrain ==
Campamento is located in a mountainous area with large areas of pine forests. Small farms cover the lower valleys in the area, predominantly growing beans and corn. The higher elevations support large coffee farms. Campamento is known for its large pine forests, which are harvested and processed in local lumber mills. Near the eastern edge of Campamento, along the Rio Guayape, is a large fish farm that raises Tilapias for export.

== Amenities and services ==
The center of the town of Campamento has two small hotels, several restaurants, shops, supermarkets, and a post office. A small central park is located along the main street, surrounded by the Alcaldia (municipal/town hall) on the west side and the Catholic church Santa Anna on the east side. Local buses run several times daily to Tegucigalpa from the central park, and buses from Juticalpa and Catacamas pass by town on the main highway on the south side of town.

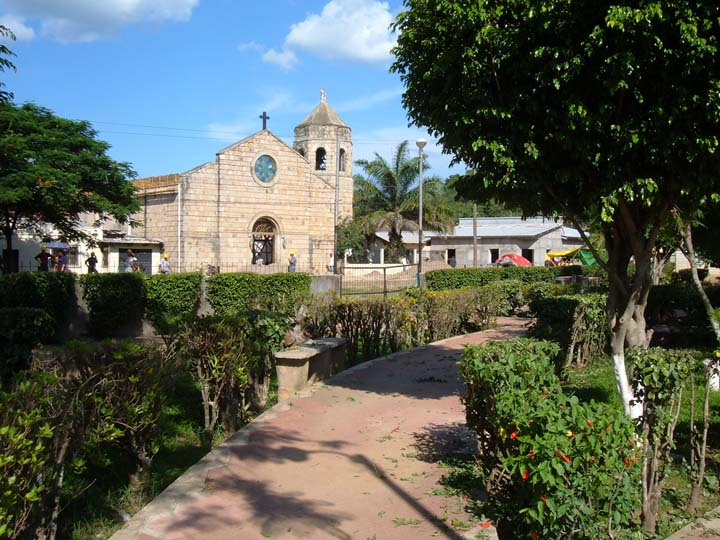
Central park and church

Olancho is considered the land of peace and love. It is also known for its loving nature and local rivers, including the Almendares River. The central park seen in the pictures has been remodeled and is now a place that is full with people who come to talk and walk at night. Olancho also has a "plazita" which is a small park that was going to be taken down but was left for the children to play. Every afternoon you can find people of all age taking a walk or playing.
