= Yocon =

Yocon may refer to:

- Yocón, municipality in Honduras
- Yocon (drug), a brand name of the medication yohimbine
