= Mangulile =

- Municipality
- Location within Honduras
- Coordinates: 15°04′N 86°48′W
- Country: Honduras
- Department: Olancho
- Villages: 16

Government
  - alcalde: Vladimir Pacheco 2014-2018

Area
  - Total: 432.65 km^{2} (167.05 sq mi)

Population (2015)
  - Total: 9,463
  - Density: 21.87/km^{2} (56.65/sq mi)
- Time zone: UTC-6
- Climate: Aw

Mangulile is a municipality in the north west of the Honduran department of Olancho, north of Yocón, south west of Manto and south east of Salamá.

Agriculture is the base of almost all commerce. Corn, beans, and coffee are the main cash crops, the sale of which provides income for other things like sugar and rice. Many of the remote villages have no access to education, healthcare, or clean water. Artesian springs provide most of the domestic water, which, because of the tropical climate, becomes contaminated soon after surfacing. Biosand water filters have been introduced to over 25 of these villages as of 2015, significantly improving health conditions. Part of the local 2015 coffee harvest was exported to the USA through a newly formed co-op, with 100% of the profits being returned to this area for infrastructure and capital for crop expansion.

== Demographics ==
At the time of the 2013 Honduras census, Mangulile municipality had a population of 9,411. Of these, 97.49% were Mestizo, 1.94% White, 0.43% Indigenous and 0.14% Black or Afro-Honduran.
