= Jicalapa Airport =

- IATA: none; ICAO: MHJI

Summary
- Airport type: Public
- Serves: Gualaco, Honduras
- Elevation AMSL: 2,133 ft / 650 m
- Coordinates: 15°00′25″N 86°03′00″W

Map
- Location of the airport in Honduras

Runways
Direction	Length		Surface
Direction	m	ft	Surface
15/33	780	2,559	Grass
- Sources: GCM Google Maps SkyVector

Jicalapa Airport (ICAO: MHJI) is an airport serving the town of Gualaco in Olancho Department, Honduras. The grass runway parallels road V-453, 3 kilometres (1.9 mi) southeast of Gualaco.

There are hills north through east of the airport.

== See also ==
- Transport in Honduras
- List of airports in Honduras
