= Pech language =

Chibchan language of Honduras

Pech
- Paya
- Pech~Pesh
- Pronunciation: [petʃ]~[peʃ]
- Native to: Honduras
- Region: North central coast (Olancho Department)
- Ethnicity: 6,000 Pech (2013)
- Native speakers: 300 (2007)
- Language family: Chibchan: Pech

Language codes
- ISO 639-3: pay
- Glottolog: pech1241
- ELP: Pech
- Linguasphere: 81-BAA-aa
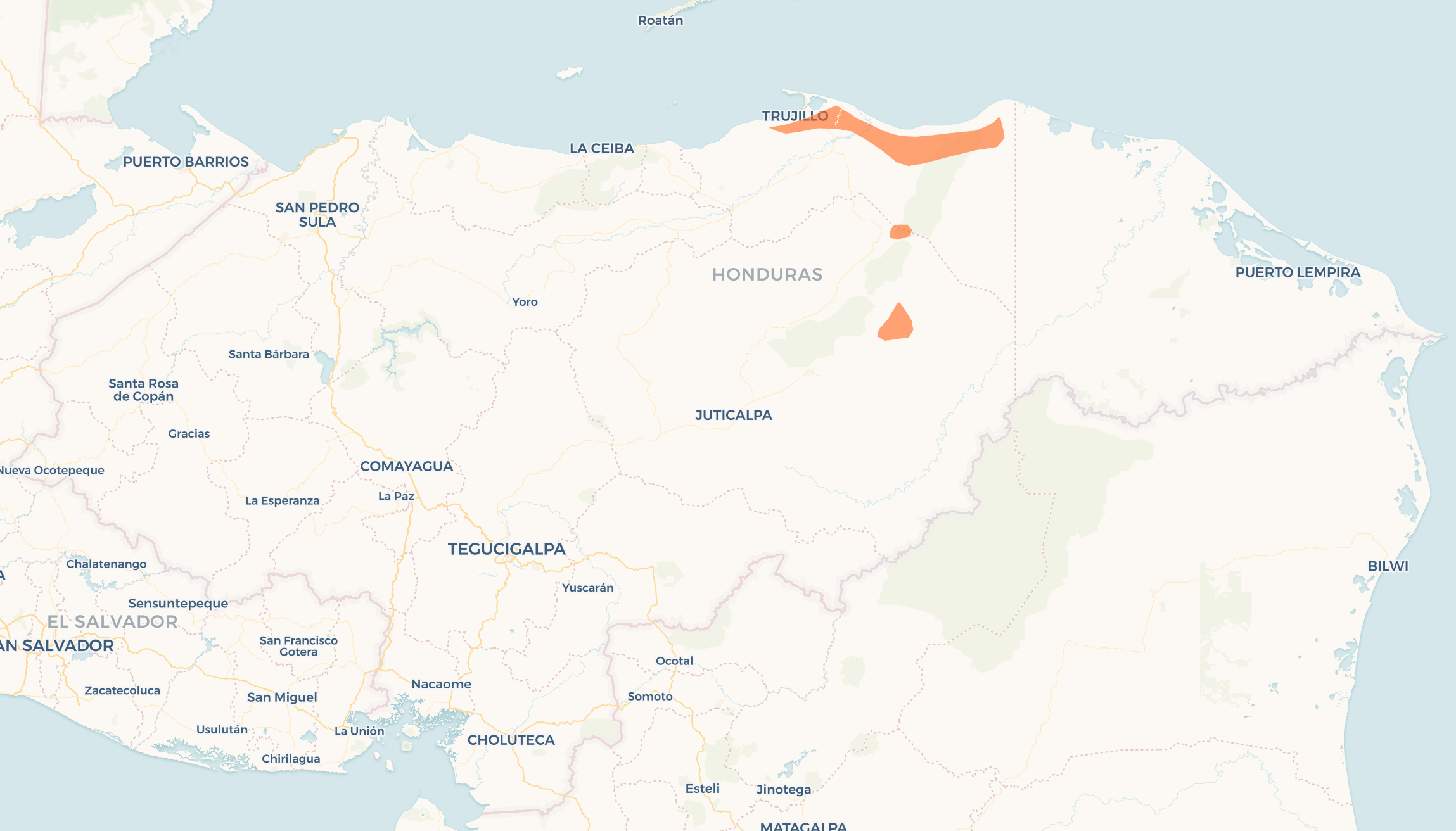
- Pech is spoken in the Colón department and the Olancho department of Honduras.

- Pech is classified as Severely Endangered by the UNESCO Atlas of the World's Languages in Danger

Pech or Pesh is a Chibchan language spoken in Honduras. It was formerly known as Paya, and continues to be referred to in this manner by several sources, though there are negative connotations associated with this term. It has also been referred to as Seco. There are 300 speakers according to Yasugi (2007). It is spoken near the north-central coast of Honduras, in the Dulce Nombre de Culmí municipality of Olancho Department.

== Classification ==
Pech is thought to have a South American origin, as it shares similar roots with the Guna language of Panama. Pech is the only remaining Chibchan language in Honduras and is currently classified as a severely endangered language.

On the basis of shared grammatical innovations, Pache (2023) argues that Pech is most closely related to the Arhuacic languages of northern Colombia, forming a Pech-Arhuacic subgroup.

== Distribution ==
According to Dennis Holt (1999), Pech is spoken by perhaps around 600 people in Olancho Department and Colón Department of Honduras. Pech used to be spoken in the town of Dulce Nombre de Culmí in the Río Guampú watershed, but Pech speakers moved out of the town due to the influx of Ladino migrants. The three primary Pech settlements are as follows.

- Vallecito, about 5 km northwest of Dulce Nombre de Culmí. It had 120 inhabitants in 1975.
- Marañones, also known as Pueblo Nuevo Subirana or Kahã Wayka (New Town). This town is about 15 km north of Dulce Nombre de Culmí. It had 150 inhabitants in 1975.
- El Carbón, originally known as Santa María del Carbón. It is located near the Quebrada Agua Amarilla in a higher mountain valley in the upper Río Seco watershed, and is about 35 km north of Culmí and about 30 km northeast of San Esteban. It had about 300 inhabitants in 1975.

Vallecito and Marañones are both located in the foothills of the Sierra de Agalta.

Other smaller Pech settlements which have at most several ethnic Pech families are scattered around northern Olancho Department, including the following (Holt 1999).

- La Danta
- Aguazarca
- Aguaquire
- Pisijiri
- Jocomico

At the time of initial Spanish contact, Pech was most likely spoken from Trujillo in the west to Cabo Gracias a Dios in the east, and as far south as the upper Patuca River (Holt 1999). Tol (Jicaque) would have been spoken just to the west.

== Phonology ==
Pech is a tonal language with 16 consonants and 10 vowels (Holt 1999). There are two tones, namely a high tone and a low tone. Both consonants and vowels display length contrast and nasalization.

=== Consonants ===
		Bilabial	Alveolar	Palatal	Velar		Glottal
		Bilabial	Alveolar	Palatal	plain	lab.	Glottal
Plosive	voiceless	p	t		k	kʷ	ʔ
Plosive	voiced	b					
Fricative			s	ʃ			h
Nasal		m	n				
Liquid	flap		ɾ				
Liquid	rhotic		r				
Liquid	lateral		l				
Semivowel				j		w	

Allophones of the sounds /b, ʃ, j, k, kʷ, w/ are realized as [β, tʃ, ᵈj~ɲ, ɡ, ɡʷ, ᵑw̃].

Notes:

- [g] is the allophone of /k/ and occurs after a long vowel
- /b/ becomes [β] in between vowels
- The [tʃ] allophone only exists for some speakers, those typically being younger speakers and speakers of non-Colón dialects. It occurs before a vowel, in place of /ʃ/. It is possible that this allophone exists solely because of extensive contact with the Spanish language.
- /j/ and /w/ are nasalized whenever next to a nasal vowel; at the beginning of words these consonants become [ᵈj] and [ɡʷ], respectively. The allophones [ɲ] and [ᵑw̃] occur because of the nasalization of [ᵈj] and [ɡʷ], respectively.

==== Distribution of consonant phonemes ====
===== Syllable clusters =====
- Initial consonant clusters begin with a true stop followed by /r/. These would include pr, tr, kr, and br.
- Medial consonant clusters may contain two consonants, three consonants if either the initial or ending consonant is /r/, or four consonants if both the initial and ending consonants are /r/.
- Geminate consonant clusters only occur with /k/, /s/, and /s̆/
  - túkkawá 'I placed it'
  - peessàwa 'their hands'
  - warès̆s̆e:bàrs̆i 'we chopped them all down'
- Vowel clusters are usually diphthongal. Non-diphthongal vowel clusters have an associated glottal structure V?V
  - Diphthongs that occur are mostly ay and aw, though there are a few cases of ey.

=== Vowels/Nasals ===
	Front		Central		Back	
	oral	nasal	oral	nasal	oral	nasal
Close	i	ĩ			u	ũ
Mid	e	ẽ			o	õ
Open			a	ã		

Notes

- Long vowels retain their full length in stressed, open syllables; they are shortened in closed or unstressed syllables. Short vowels are open and lax in closed or unstressed syllables, unlike long vowels, which are close and tense.
- Nasal vowels are usually more open than oral vowels
- Vowels may be voiceless between voiceless consonants in unstressed syllables

=== Tone ===
- As a tone-language, Pech has two to three distinctive pitch-levels: high tone (á, é, í, ó, ú) low tone (à, è, ì, ò, ù), and sometimes, extra low tone. This lower than normal tone is rare, though it occurs particularly with the suffix -rih.
- Tones distinguish between lexical items and inflectional types

=== Stress ===
Pech has primary and secondary levels of stress, which are not distinctive. They rely on the underlying marked tone and stem syllables. Primary stress tends to occur in the last syllable of the stem. Primary and secondary stress are also related to inflectional suffixes.

=== Phonological processes ===
Internal sandhi: this includes vocalic contraction and assimilation, vocalic and consonantal syncope, nasal assimilation, metathesis, and epenthesis

- Vocalic contractions:
  - a + a = a; i.e. a-ra-hà? becomes [-rá?];
  - a + w or w + a = o and a + wa = ɑ; i.e. apè:s̆wàkwa-térskà becomes [pè:s̆wàkotɛ́rská]
  - a + i (or y) = e; i.e. ã̀-i-wá becomes [nḕw̃ã̀]
- Vocalic assimilation: when i precedes w, it becomes u (s̆i-wa becomes s̆uwa). This may possible include non-high vowels, as in the case with sàwa which is sometimes pronounced [sùwa]
- Consonantal assimilation is actually quite rare as it seems to only really occur in the word pes̆hará becoming [pes̆s̆rá] (when following /s̆/, /h/ is realized as /s̆/).
- Nasal assimilation of vowels and semivowels occurs in segments in which vowels, glides, a glottal stop, and /h/ occur

== Morphology ==
Morphological processes present in this language include affixation, reduplication, vocalic ablaut, and heightening of phonemic tone.

The four word classes that Pech has are nouns, verbs, adjectives, and particles.

=== Nouns ===
Prefixes and suffixes inflect nouns for possession.

Possessive Pronominal Prefixes
	Singular	Dual	Plural
1st person	ta-	pata-	ùnta-
2nd person	pí-		pí- ... -wá
3rd person	a-		pèš-/pè:-

- The 2nd-person plural involves discontinuous morphemes
- ʔ appears between any prefixes and a noun beginning with a vowel, i.e. pè:-sòrwa vs ta?-ìraka

Inalienably Possessed Nouns: These generally occur with possessive pronominal prefixes. These prefixes are only dropped when these noun-stems are part of compound nouns.

- Body-part terms
  - ta-sàwa 'my hand(s)'
  - a-màkú 'his/her navel'
  - a-súru 'its rib(s)'
- Terms of spatial relationship: spatial relationships are composed of possessed relational nouns + locative case-suffix -yã̀. Examples of these terms:
  - a-sùkk-yã̀ 'behind/back'
  - a-wákiʔ-yã̀ 'in front of'
  - a-brì-yã̀ 'beside, alongside'
  - a-ʔà-yã̀ 'on top of'
  - a-ràhni-yã̀ 'outside of'

Note: 'between' does not follow this pattern, as seen in asàʔ a-kèrahã̀ 'between the stones'

- Kinship Terms
  - ta-kà:ki 'my mother'
  - pí-tu:s 'your father'
  - a-ta-kàyʔká 'my nephew'
  - a-šuwá 'her husband's brother'
  - a-sáʔa 'his wife's sister'
  - ta-wã̀ʔã 'my mother-in-law'
- Words for natural emanations or effluvia: these are words possessed by natural substances, persons, or phenomena
  - e.g. asò a-wã̀ská means steam, though its literal translation is 'water its-smoke'
- Other special words: words expressing things that stand in special relationships to humans
  - e.g. pata-tí:štahá meaning 'God', with its literal translation being 'our sower'

Case Suffixes
Nominative -yã̀ʔ	Comitative/Instrumental -yó
Objective -ra	Mediative/Instrumental -rí
Genitive -ʔe	Manner/Relational -kán
Locative/Allative -yã̀	Absolutive -ká/-(h)á

Case Suffixes with complex noun-phrases:

- These are attached to the final word of the phrase
- When there are multiple adjectives present, each is marked with the same case-suffix
- In clauses, the case-marking suffix is usually associated with the verb

Emphatic Suffixes These occur with subjects, direct objects, and some oblique objects that are already marked with case-suffixes. These suffixes are -ma (with subject, direct object noun, or noun-phrase) and -hã̀ʔ (with objective and locative nouns)

Personal Pronouns
	Singular	Dual	Plural
1st Person	tàs	patàs	untàs
2nd Person	pà:		pà:- -wa
3rd Person	éka		éka

- Subject pronouns are optional, and are generally accompanied by -yã̀ʔ or -ma, though some may occur without.

=== Verbs ===
Verb inflection is made with prefixes and suffixes, though vocalic ablaut is present in certain verb-stems and future-tense suffixes. Positions for the finite verb include:

- Object-pronominal prefix
- Object case-marking morphemes
- Verb-stem
- Frequentative/durational aspect-suffixes
- Completive suffix
- Aspect-suffixes
- Subject-suffixes
- Negative suffix
- Tense-suffixes
- Modal and aspectual suffixes
- 2nd-person-plural suffix

=== Adjectives ===
- Qualitative adjectives: uninflected, though case-suffixes may be present if phrase-finally in a noun phrase
- Demonstrative adjectives: no definite article exists, though these serve a similar purpose and precede the nouns they modify. They include ī 'this, these' (proximal), tuʔ (~toʔ) 'that, those' (distal 1), ã 'that, those' (distal 2).
- Numerals: appear independently after the nouns they modify

=== Adverbs ===
- Adverbs of manner: can be created with the case-suffix -kán.
- Adverbs of time: morphologically postpositional phrases involving the mediative case-suffix
- Adverbs of location

== Syntax ==
=== Word order ===
Pech is an SOV (subject–object–verb) language (Holt 1999). There are exceptions to this, as oblique noun-phrases, adverbials, direct object noun-phrases, and subject noun-phrases all are capable of occurring after verbs. Over all, Pech is a synthetic language which uses mostly suffixes, but also prefixes, vocalic ablaut, and reduplication as well.

=== Sentences ===
In Pech, both simple and complex sentences exist. The first consists of a single independent clause while the latter consists of independent and dependent clauses. Independent nouns or pronoun subjects are not necessary within a sentence, and sentence may contain no more than a single verb form, within which the pronominal subject is marked.

The focus of a sentence is marked by the emphatic suffix -ma, which may follow nouns, pronouns, verbal nominals, time adverbials, and other word types. Object nouns and noun-phrases can be emphasized with the suffix -hã́?, which follows the objective or locative case-suffix. The suffixes -ma and -hã́? cannot both be within the same simple sentence.

Other parts of a sentence are marked as follows:

Conjunction:

Conjunction Type	Formed by:
Noun + noun	Adding suffix rih- to each noun in the conjoined set
Verb + verb	Serial verb-stems that include the stem, subject suffix, and object-prefixes for each verb involved Include the verb nã̀ ('go') and the verb tèʔ(k) in first and final position, with other verb-stems in between.
Verb-phrase & sentence conjunction	Linear sequencing; it does not require the use of a morpheme or conjunctive word

- Notes
  - Because verbal compounds are possible in Pech, verbal words can be quite lengthy.
  - Disjunction: marked by the particle á:ã́srī́?

Subordination:

Suffixes Involved	Purpose
The suffix -íná? is usually paired with the suffix -péšá?	Expresses 'although' or 'even though'
Previative suffixes such as -tutàwá? and tu?^{[w]}èr	Assign temporal priority to the main clause and relative anteriority to the subordinate clause
The suffix -táni?	Expresses indefinite future time, i.e. 'when, as soon as, etc.'
Simultaneitive suffix wã́	Forms non-finite participial clauses meaning something like 'while, during, when, etc.'
Subordinating suffixes: -wà (present tense, and which changes depending on the subject and plurality) and -hã́? (future tense)	Added to conjugated verbs to form finite subordinate clauses
The suffix -mā? (subjunctive meaning)	Used to form if-clauses
The suffix -(à)srí	Serves the same purpose as -mā?, though it expresses more uncertainty
The suffix -rikeh	Expresses 'although, even though, etc.'; the difference between this and -íná? is not specified
The suffix -rás	Expresses the concept of 'because, since, etc.

Interrogation:

Suffixes Involved	Purpose
The interrogative suffix -éreh	Added to the verbal construction of a sentence in either the past or present tense to turn it into a yes–no question
The interrogative suffix -iká	Same purpose as -éreh, but for sentences in the future tense
The suffix pīš	Used to express 'how many?' or 'how much?'
The suffix -sah	Expresses question words (what, where, who, why)

- Notes:
  - 'How' also includes the verb kà?-/kì?- which means 'make/do'

== Sources ==
- Holt, Dennis Graham. (1986).The Development of the Paya Sound-System. Ph.D. dissertation, Department of Linguistics, University of California, Los Angeles.
- Holt, Dennis Graham. (1989). "On Paya Causatives." Estudios de Lingüística Chibcha 8: 7-15. San José: Editorial de la Universidad de Costa Rica.
- Holt, Dennis Graham. (1999). Pech (Paya). Languages of the World/Materials 366. Munich: LincomEuropa.
