= Silca, Honduras =

- Municipality
- Location in Honduras
- Coordinates: 14°48′39″N 86°32′47″W
- Country: Honduras
- Department: Olancho

Area
  - Total: 253 km^{2} (98 sq mi)

Population (2023)
  - Total: 8,354
  - Density: 33.0/km^{2} (85.5/sq mi)

Silca is a municipality in the Olancho Department of central Honduras. As of 2023, its population was estimated at 8,354.

== History ==
The time in which it was founded is unknown. In 1684, it is known that it already existed. In 1878, it was given the category of Municipality.

According to the Historian of Silca during an interview done by “GuayapeTV” he said that the History of the people of Silca started first when it was inhabited by Indigenous tribes. after the conquest of the Spanish, Silca was a hub for Enslaved Africans brought by the Spanish for the gold washings of Olancho, Many of them being from The Belgian Congo, and Senegal. Later on many escaped Africans settled in Silca. According to the Historian, the people of Silca are descendants of Spaniards, West Africans, Central Africans, and Indigenous Americans. This is the reason people who are from Silca are called Congos as a nickname.

Silca is a testimony of the history of Honduras.
