= Guarizama =

- Municipality
- Location within Honduras
- Coordinates: 14°55′N 86°20′W
- Country: Honduras
- Department: Olancho
- Villages: 5
- Municipality since: 1901

Area
  - Total: 16.91 km^{2} (6.53 sq mi)

Population (2015)
  - Total: 7,852
  - Density: 464.3/km^{2} (1,203/sq mi)
- Climate: Aw

Guarizama is a municipality in the Honduran department of Olancho.

Its name comes from Quanhilzamatil, tight amate tree, probably in the place had that tree.

== Historical data ==
In the population census of 1887 listed as Manto Village in 1901 was given municipality status.

== Villages ==
The municipality has the following five villages: National Institute of Statistics, Honduras. (Census 2001)

- Guarizama
- El Zapotal
- La Carta
- El Rodeo
- Trinidad

== Demographics ==
At the time of the 2013 Honduras census, Guarizama municipality had a population of 7,769. Of these, 98.12% were Mestizo, 1.52% White, 0.19% Black or Afro-Honduran and 0.17% Indigenous.
