= San Esteban, Honduras =

San Esteban
- Municipality
- Location within Honduras
- Coordinates: 15°12′45″N 85°46′10″W
- Country: Honduras
- Department: Olancho
- Villages: 22

Area
  - Total: 1,962.34 km^{2} (757.66 sq mi)

Population (2015)
  - Total: 26,187
  - Density: 13.345/km^{2} (34.563/sq mi)
- Climate: Am

San Esteban is a municipality in the northeast of the Honduran department of Olancho, west of Dulce Nombre de Culmí, east of Gualaco and north of Catacamas. Costa Rican author Oscar Núñez Oliva set his 2000 novel Los Gallos de San Esteban in the municipality.

== History ==
The municipality was named in honor of friar Esteban Verdelete, a missionary who collaborated in the evangelism of the people of the region.

It was founded in 1808 by friar José Antonio Liendo y Goicoechea from Guatemala. It was populated by indigenous people at that time.

== Geography ==
The municipality is bordered to the north by the municipalities of Trujillo and Iriona, South by the municipality of Catacamas, East by the municipality of Dulce Nombre de Culmí and West by the municipality of Gualaco. It stretches from the top the Agalta valley and crossed by the Grande Agalta river.

== Villages ==
The municipality has the following 22 villages:

- San Esteban
- Agua Blanca
- Carnizuelar
- Conquire
- Coronado
- Corral Viejo
- El Aguacate
- El Ciruelo
- El Limonal
- El Ocote
- El Quebrachal
- El Tunal
- La Concepción
- Las Manzanas
- Las Trojas
- Moreno
- Río Abajo
- San Agustín Abajo
- San Martín
- Santa María
- Santa María del Carbón
- Toro Muerto

== Demographics ==
At the time of the 2013 Honduras census, San Esteban municipality had a population of 25,572. Of these, 90.33% were Mestizo, 6.11% Indigenous (5.84% Pech), 2.79% White, 0.36% Black or Afro-Honduran and 0.41% others.
