= Gualaco =

- Municipality
- Location within Honduras
- Coordinates: 15°01′35″N 86°04′15″W
- Country: Honduras
- Department: Olancho
- Villages: 10

Area
  - Total: 2,363.45 km^{2} (912.53 sq mi)
- Elevation: 650 m (2,140 ft)

Population (2015)
  - Total: 22,327
  - Density: 9.4468/km^{2} (24.467/sq mi)
- Climate: Aw
- Sources: Google Maps

Gualaco is a municipality in the north of the Honduran department of Olancho, west of San Esteban, north of Santa Maria del Real and east of Guata.

Gualaco is served by Jicalapa Airport, a grass airstrip 3 kilometres (1.9 mi) southeast of town.

== Demographics ==
At the time of the 2013 Honduras census, Gualaco municipality had a population of 21,863. Of these, 97.11% were Mestizo, 1.76% White, 0.56% Indigenous, 0.50% Black or Afro-Honduran and 0.07% others.
