= Dulce Nombre de Culmí =

- Municipality
- Location within Honduras
- Coordinates: 15°7′0″N 85°31′6″W
- Country: Honduras
- Department: Olancho
- Villages: 27

Area
  - Total: 2,925.03 km^{2} (1,129.36 sq mi)

Population (2015)
  - Total: 30,543
  - Density: 10.442/km^{2} (27.045/sq mi)
- Climate: Am

Dulce Nombre de Culmí (Spanish pronunciation: [ˈdulse ˈnombɾe ðe kulˈmi]) is a municipality in the northeastern region of the Honduran department of Olancho. It lies approximately 17 miles (27 km.) southeast of San Esteban and about 27 miles (43 km.) northeast of Catacamas. The Ríos Guampú (or Wampú) and Culmí pass through this municipality.

== Demographics ==
At the time of the 2013 Honduras census, Dulce Nombre de Culmí municipality had a population of 29,947. Of these, 91.29% were Mestizo, 8.16% Indigenous (7.09% Pech), 0.32% White, 0.16% Black or Afro-Honduran and 0.07% others.

== Pech people ==
This area of Olancho is the home of one of the seven indigenous peoples living in Honduras, the Pech, formerly known as "Payas". As of early 2005, the Pech population had been reduced to 3,800. The Pech language is a member of the Chibchan family of languages, and, although it is still spoken by older people, it is in danger of extinction in the relatively near future. Despite modern influences, the Pech still preserve their simple way of living and traditions.
