= Guayape =

- Municipality
- Location within Honduras
- Coordinates: 14°43′N 86°50′W
- Country: Honduras
- Department: Olancho
- Villages: 15

Area
  - Total: 422.49 km^{2} (163.12 sq mi)

Population (2015)
  - Total: 12,907
  - Density: 30.550/km^{2} (79.124/sq mi)
- Climate: Aw

Guayape is a municipality in the west of the Honduran department of Olancho, west of Salamá, south of Yocón and north of Concordia.

Guayape is divided into three huge territories. Some even covering the river. The lands are divided by the three families that control it. The Riveras, The Lagos, and the Guerreros.

Although not a very well known place, even to Hondurans, Guayape is characterised by its natural landscapes, waterfalls, and fertile soil.

== Demographics ==
At the time of the 2013 Honduras census, Guayape municipality had a population of 12,671. Of these, 99.21% were Mestizo, 0.59% Indigenous, 0.13% Black or Afro-Honduran, 0.04% White and 0.02% others.
