= Jano =

- Municipality
- Location within Honduras
- Coordinates: 15°03′N 86°30′W
- Country: Honduras
- Department: Olancho
- Villages: 8

Area
  - Total: 362.71 km^{2} (140.04 sq mi)

Population (2015)
  - Total: 4,805
  - Density: 13.25/km^{2} (34.31/sq mi)

Jano is a town and municipality in the north west of the Honduran department of Olancho, west of Guata, south of Esquipulas del Norte and north of Manto, Honduras.

== Villages ==
Jano municipality encompasses the following villages:

- Jano
- Comayaguela
- El Zapotillo
- La Pita
- La Victoria
- Las Labranzas
- Pacaya
- Pintora

== Demographics ==
At the time of the 2013 Honduras census, Jano municipality had a population of 4,553. Of these, 90.97% were Mestizo, 8.15% White, 0.51% Black or Afro-Honduran and 0.37% Indigenous.
