= Santa María del Real =

- Municipality
- Location within Honduras
- Coordinates: 14°46′N 85°57′W
- Country: Honduras
- Department: Olancho
- Villages: 3

Area
  - Total: 230.80 km^{2} (89.11 sq mi)

Population (2015)
  - Total: 10,767
  - Density: 46.651/km^{2} (120.82/sq mi)

Santa María del Real is a municipality in the Honduran department of Olancho.

== Demographics ==
At the time of the 2013 Honduras census, Santa María del Real municipality had a population of 10,636. Of these, 87.83% were Mestizo, 8.17% White, 2.18% Black or Afro-Honduran, 1.81% Indigenous (1.09% Chʼortiʼ, 0.39% Lenca) and 0.01% others.
