= Yocón =

- Municipality
- Location within Honduras
- Coordinates: 15°01′N 86°42′W
- Country: Honduras
- Department: Olancho
- Villages: 9

Area
  - Total: 243.15 km^{2} (93.88 sq mi)

Population (2015)
  - Total: 12,182
  - Density: 50.101/km^{2} (129.76/sq mi)

Yocón is a municipality in the west of the Honduran department of Olancho, north of Guayape, south of Mangulile and west of El Rosario.

== Demographics ==
At the time of the 2013 Honduras census, Yocón municipality had a population of 11,812. Of these, 99.24% were Mestizo, 0.45% Indigenous, 0.20% Black or Afro-Honduran and 0.11% White.
