= Manto, Honduras =

Manto
- Municipality
- Location within Honduras
- Coordinates: 14°55′N 86°23′W
- Country: Honduras
- Department: Olancho

Area
  - Total: 517.19 km^{2} (199.69 sq mi)

Population (2015)
  - Total: 11,641
  - Density: 22.508/km^{2} (58.296/sq mi)
- Time zone: UTC-6
- Climate: Aw

Manto is a municipality in the Honduran department of Olancho.

== Demographics ==
At the time of the 2013 Honduras census, Manto municipality had a population of 9,625. Of these, 95.62% were Mestizo, 3.29% White, 0.57% Indigenous and 0.51% Black or Afro-Honduran.
