= Esquipulas del Norte =

- Municipality
- Location within Honduras
- Coordinates: 15°18′N 86°32′W
- Country: Honduras
- Department: Olancho
- Villages: 8

Area
  - Total: 523.33 km^{2} (202.06 sq mi)
- Elevation: 547 m (1,795 ft)

Population (2015)
  - Total: 10,781
  - Density: 20.601/km^{2} (53.356/sq mi)

Esquipulas del Norte is a municipality in the north west of the Honduran department of Olancho, east of Guata and north of Jano.

== Demographics ==
At the time of the 2013 Honduras census, Esquipulas del Norte municipality had a population of 10,138. Of these, 98.75% were Mestizo, 0.78% White, 0.27% Indigenous and 0.21% Black or Afro-Honduran.
