= Salamá, Honduras =

Salamá
- Municipality
- Location within Honduras
- Coordinates: 14°50′N 86°35′W
- Country: Honduras
- Department: Olancho
- Villages: 8

Area
  - Total: 337.85 km^{2} (130.44 sq mi)

Population (2015)
  - Total: 7,697
  - Density: 22.78/km^{2} (59.01/sq mi)
- Time zone: UTC-6
- Climate: Aw

Salamá is a municipality in the Honduran department of Olancho.

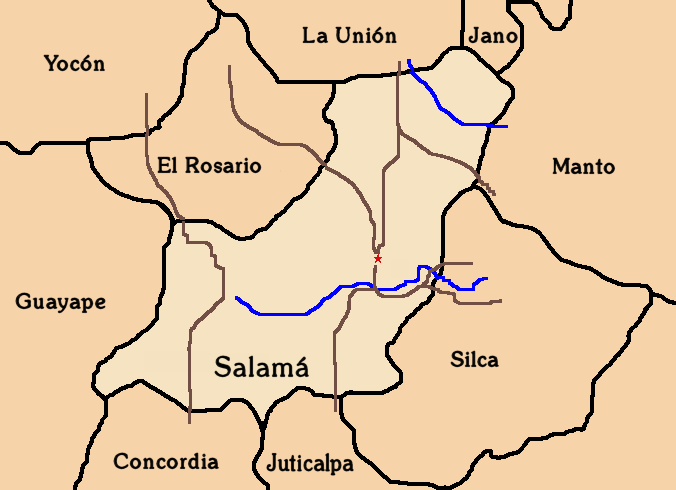
Map of Salamá Municipality

== Demographics ==
At the time of the 2013 Honduras census, Salamá municipality had a population of 7,542. Of these, 99.23% were Mestizo, 0.62% Indigenous, 0.12% Black or Afro-Honduran and 0.03% White.
