= Olancho Department =

Olancho Department Departamento de Olancho
- Department
- Flag

- Location of Olancho in Honduras
- Coordinates: 14°36′N 86°12′W
- Country: Honduras
- Municipalities: 23
- Villages: 287
- Founded: 1825 (Note: Olancho was one of the first 7 departments in which the national territory was divided in the first political division of Honduras in 1825.)
- Capital city: Juticalpa

Government
  - Type: Departmental
  - Governor: Victor Moreno (2022-2026) (LibRe)

Area
  - Total: 24,038 km^{2} (9,281 sq mi)

Population (2015)
  - Total: 537,306
  - Density: 22.352/km^{2} (57.892/sq mi)

GDP (Nominal, 2015 US dollar)
  - Total: $1.3 billion (2023)
  - Per capita: $2,000 (2023)

GDP (PPP, 2015 int. dollar)
  - Total: $2.7 billion (2023)
  - Per capita: $4,100 (2023)
- Time zone: UTC-6 (CDT)
- Postal code: 16101, 16201
- ISO 3166 code: HN-OL
- HDI (2021): 0.578 medium · 14th of 18
- Statistics derived from Consult INE online database: Population and Housing Census 2013

Olancho is the largest of all the 18 departments into which Honduras is divided. The department covers a total surface area of 24,057 km^{2} (9,288 sq mi) and has an estimated 2015 population of 537,306 inhabitants.

The departmental capital is Juticalpa, which is also the see of the Roman Catholic Diocese of Juticalpa, which covers the department.

== Terrain ==
Rugged mountains rise in the western and northern portions of the department, notably the Sierra de Agalta, the Montaña de Tembladeros, and the Montaña de Botaderos. Vast pine and hardwood forests cover these mountains.

Central Olancho has rolling plains, watered by the Guayape River and its affluents. These plains, sometimes called pampas due to their similarity to the vast Argentinian plains, are famous for their large cattle herds and extensive farming. The main cities, capital Juticalpa and Catacamas, are located there.

The eastern part of the department is covered with rainforests, though the influx of impoverished, farmers and intense timber extraction have increased deforestation rates in the area. A portion of the Rio Platano Biosphere Reserve, a tropical rainforest with diverse wildlife and declared a World Heritage site by UNESCO, straddles the border of Olancho and the neighboring departments of Gracias a Dios and Colón.

The Guayape River is famous for its placer gold with concessions where today the mining company Eurocantera (Goldlake Group) exploits ethical gold. First exploited by the Spaniards during the colonial period, these gold deposits are still productive. Local men and women may be seen panning for gold in riverbanks during the dry season. Extensive gold dredging is also underway during the dry season in much of the river, including deep into the mountainous regions of the Rio Patuca (into which the Guayape feeds).

== History ==
=== Background ===
The Cave of Talgua, also known as "The Cave of the Glowing Skulls," is located near Catacamas. It was used as a burial site by the native peoples, and over time, the bones left there were covered by the calcite dripping from the ceiling, giving them an eerie, sparkling appearance. Radiocarbon testing indicated that the burials were made around 900 B.C., well before the rise of the Mayans and other civilizations. The ossuary chamber was discovered in 1994 by a Peace Corps volunteer named Timothy Berg, along with two Catacamas locals named Desiderio Reyes and Jorge Yáñez, and research is still being conducted in the area.

At the time of Spanish colonization, the indigenous inhabitants of the region included the Pech, Tolupan, Lenca and possibly Nahuas.

=== Colonization ===
During colonization of what is now Olancho, as many as 2,000 African slaves had been imported to Honduras to work in the gold washings of Olancho. Mainly coming from what is now known as Angola and Senegambia, while many others came from the Caribbean.

=== Modern day ===
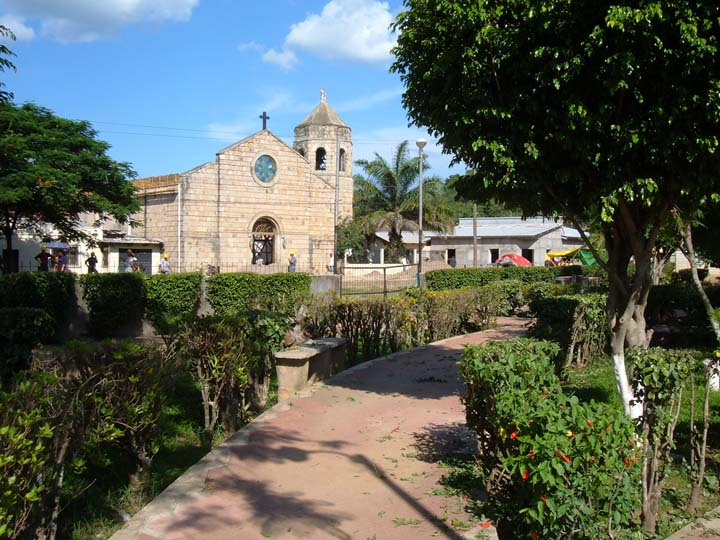
Central park and church at Campamento

In the 18th and 19th century, Olancho resisted government authority from Tegucigalpa, resulting in armed conflicts. Old independent sentiments persist among Olanchanos, although the department's role as an agricultural producer has made it an integral part of the Honduran economy. The former president of Honduras, Porfirio Lobo, hails from the department, specifically from the city of Juticalpa. Also former president, now congressman, Manuel Zelaya Rosales is from the city of Catacamas, also from the department.

The Olancho Department remained as one of the most violent areas in Honduras until 2012. In June 2012, after a Drug Enforcement Administration agent killed a suspect in Honduras, it was confirmed that the US government has been running covert operations in the Olancho area to combat drug trafficking. Many multinational corporations as well as charitable and religious organizations with personnel in Honduras actively discourage their members from visiting Olancho or suggest caution, as do the governments of the US, Canada, France, New Zealand and the UK, among others.

== Municipalities ==
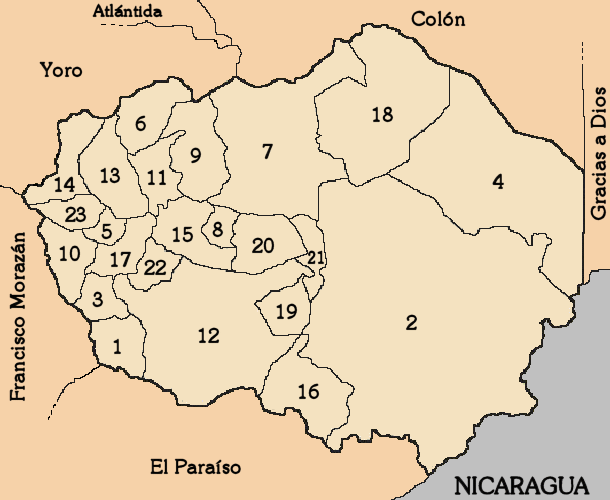
Municipalities of Olancho Department keyed at left

1. Campamento
2. Catacamas
3. Concordia
4. Dulce Nombre de Culmí
5. El Rosario
6. Esquipulas del Norte
7. Gualaco
8. Guarizama
9. Guata
10. Guayape
11. Jano
12. Juticalpa
13. La Unión
14. Mangulile
15. Manto
16. Patuca
17. Salamá
18. San Esteban
19. San Francisco de Becerra
20. San Francisco de la Paz
21. Santa María del Real
22. Silca
23. Yocón

== Demographics ==
At the time of the 2013 Honduras census, Olancho Department had a population of 520,761. Of these, 94.54% were (Mestizo With significant African ancestry ranging from 25% - 60% West & Central African ancestry), 3.39% White, 1.23% Indigenous (0.71% Pech, 0.21% Lenca, 0.16% Nahua), 0.60% self-identifying Black or Afro-Honduran and 0.24% others.

== Tourism ==
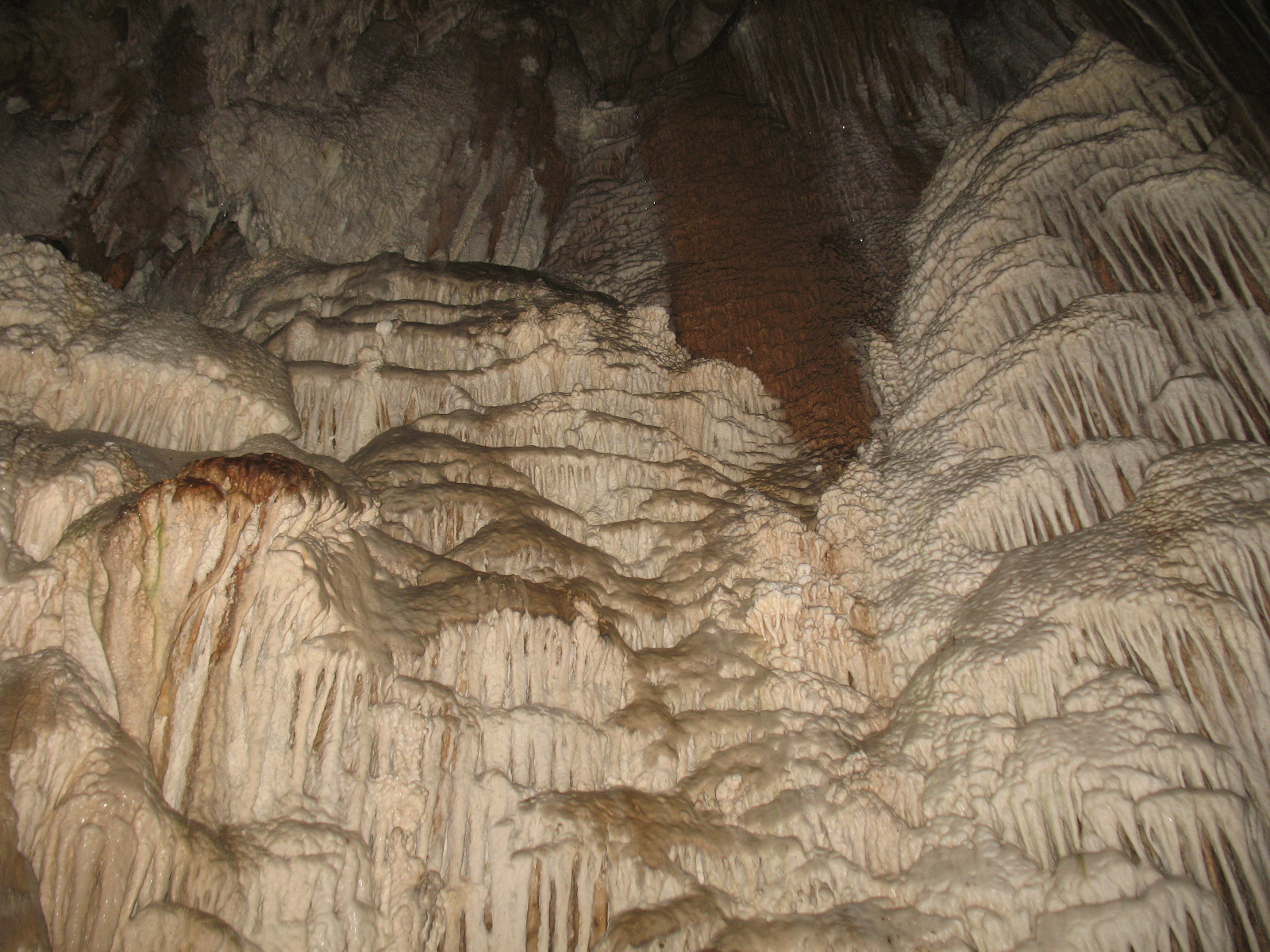
Caves of Talgua

- Colonial church in the town of Catacamas
- Talgua Caves
- Part of the Río Plátano Biosphere Reserve is located in Olanchano territory
- National parks of Patuca
- Agalta mountain range
- The wall
- The Boquerón

== Popular culture ==
Olancho was the subject of a 2017 feature-length documentary film of the same name. The documentary, which was directed and produced by American filmmakers Chris Valdes and Ted Griswold, focused on the lives of band members from Los Plebes de Olancho, a regional narco-corrido music band. The logline of the film is as follows:

Manuel, a farmer from Olancho, Honduras, seeks fame by making music for the region’s drug cartels. When some of his song lyrics get him in trouble, Manuel must make the most difficult decision of his life: continue the quest for fame, or flee.

Olancho premiered at the 2017 Big Sky Documentary Film Festival in Missoula, Montana. Over the course of the following two years, the film went on to screen at dozens of international film festivals, including at the Rotterdam Film Festival in the Netherlands and the Berlin Film Festival in Germany. The film earned the Special Jury Prize for Best Documentary Feature at the 2017 New Orleans Film Festival, Best Cinematography at the 2017 Tulsa American Film Festival, and Best Feature Documentary Film at the 2017 Nevada City Film Festival. Olancho is distributed by First Run Features and is now available streaming on Kanopy and for purchase on Amazon.
