= Highways in Honduras =

The network of highways in Honduras is managed by the Secretariat of public works, transport and housing (SOPTRAVI), through the General Directorate of Roads, which is responsible for planning construction and maintenance work on the country's roads. Honduras has more than 15,400 kilometres (9,600 mi) of roads. Up to 1999, only 3,126 kilometres (1,942 mi) had been paved.

The main motorway of the country is that from Puerto Cortés on the Caribbean to San Pedro Sula (CA-13), joining the CA-5 from San Pedro Sula to Tegucigalpa, and continuing to Nacaome and Choluteca in the south of the country, where it crosses the Pan-American Highway towards Nicaragua (CA-1).

== Classification ==
The road network is divided into primary, secondary, tertiary and local networks. The primary network connects the main cities, and has a total length of 3,275 km. The secondary network joins main cities to surrounding small towns and villages, and links the 18 Departments of Honduras; its total length is 2,554 km. The local network consists of all the routes linking the small towns and villages; it is important for the 118 municipalities of Honduras, and has a total length of 8,214 km.

There is also a "tertiary" network, built by organizations such as the National Coffee Fund (Fondo Cafetero Nacional), the Honduran Coffee Institute (Instituto Hondureño del Cafe, IHCAFE), the Honduran Council for Forest Development (Consejo Hondureño de Desarrollo Forestal, COHDEFOR), the Honduran Social Investment Fund (Fondo Hondureño de Inversión Social, FHIS), the Ministry of Agriculture and Livestock (Secretaría de Agricultura y Ganadería, SAG), in addition to municipalities, certain private companies, and any other organization not affiliated to the Road Fund nor to SOPTRAVI. This network has a length of between 7,000 and 12,000 km.

== Main routes ==
=== Panamerican Highway CA-1 ===
The Panamerican Highway, the world's longest road, crosses the American continent from Alaska to Patagonia. The Honduran sector begins at the El Salvador frontier at El Amatillo and runs through Nacaome, Jícaro Galán – where it meets the Carretera del Sur (CA-5) – Choluteca, San Marcos de Colón to the Nicaraguan frontier at El Espino.

=== CA-5 ===
Carretera del Norte – CA-5 is a four-lane paved road 350 km in length linking Tegucigalpa with Comayagua, Siguatepeque, El Lago de Yojoa, Potrerillos, Pimienta, Búfalo, Villa Nueva and San Pedro Sula.

Carretera del Sur – CA-5 is a 100-km two-lane motorway in some parts three-lane linking Tegucigalpa with Sabanagrande, Pespire, finishing in Jícaro Galán, where it joins with the CA-1 Panamerican Highway.

=== CA-13 ===
Carretera CA-13 is a paved road 350 km in length linking San Pedro Sula with Omoa, Puerto Cortes, El Progreso, Tela, La Ceiba, and other towns on the Atlantic coast. It also links Puerto Cortés with Omoa, Cuyamel and Corinto (the Guatemalan frontier).

Carretera La Ceiba-Trujillo begins at La Ceiba and runs through Jutiapa, Balfate, Sabá, Tocoa and Corocito to Trujillo, finishing at Puerto Castilla. It has branches from Sabá to Olanchito and from Corocito to Bonito Oriental.

=== Carretera a Olancho ===
This highway links Tegucigalpa with Olancho and is 250 km in length. It runs through the towns of Talanga, Guaimaca, Campamento, Juticalpa, Jutiquile, Santa María del Real and Catacamas.

=== Carretera de Oriente CA-6 ===
The Carretera de Oriente (Eastern Highway) runs from Tegucigalpa to the Nicaraguan frontier. It runs through the valley of El Zamorano and the communities of Jacaleapa, Danlí and El Paraíso and reaches the frontier at Las Manos. It is also linked to the communities of Güinope, Maraita, Morocelí, Villa de San Francisco, Yuscarán and Oropolí. It joins Departmental Highway 25 serving Valle de Ángeles and Cantarranas.

=== Carretera de Occidente CA-4 ===
The Carretera de Occidente (Western Highway) runs from San Pedro Sula through the western part of the country to the Guatemalan frontier. It runs through the valley of Quimistán and the communities of Santa Bárbara, La Entrada, Copán Ruinas, El Florido, Santa Rosa de Copán and Nueva Ocotepeque. It also has two branches, one to the customs post at Agua Caliente (Guatemalan frontier) and the other to the customs post at El Poy (El Salvador frontier).

=== Carretera San Pedro Sula – El Progreso ===
This highway links San Pedro Sula with the town of El Progreso. It is a paved four-lane road 30 km in length. Its route is via the town of La Lima, then crossing the Ulúa River by the Puente la Democracia (Democracy Bridge) and finishing at El Progreso.

=== Carretera El Progreso – Yoro ===
This highway runs through Yoro Department, starting at El Progreso and running through the communities of Las Guanchías, Agua Blanca Sur, Santa Rita, El Negrito and Morazán. Its length is 128 km.

== See also ==
- Transport in Honduras
