= CA5 =

CA5, CA-5, Ca.5, or Ca5 may refer to:

- California's 5th congressional district
- USS Huntington (CA-5), a United States Navy Pennsylvania-class armored cruiser
- United States Court of Appeals for the Fifth Circuit
- California State Route 5 (disambiguation)
- Caproni Ca.5, an Italian heavy bomber of the World War I and post-war era
- Ca5 line, a regional Catalonia railway line
- CA-5, a highway in Honduras
