= Liure =

- Municipality
- Location in Honduras
- Coordinates: 13°32′N 87°06′W
- Country: Honduras
- Department: El Paraíso

Area
  - Total: 88 km^{2} (34 sq mi)

Population (2015)
  - Total: 10,760
  - Density: 120/km^{2} (320/sq mi)

Liure is a municipality in the Honduran department of El Paraíso.

== Name Origin ==
It is said that the name means "Free", since it wanted to express that the residents of the new town were finally emancipated of Texiguat. However, it is speculated that the name really means "Water of Feathers".

== Villages ==
It has around 14,000 inhabitants, spread over 5 villages:

- Bocuire
- Santa Cruz
- San Ramon
- Monte Grande
- Asuncion
