= Pseudorhombilidae =

Scientific classification
- Kingdom: Animalia
- Phylum: Arthropoda
- Clade: Pancrustacea
- Class: Malacostraca
- Order: Decapoda
- Suborder: Pleocyemata
- Infraorder: Brachyura
- Superfamily: Xanthoidea
- Family: Pseudorhombilidae; Alcock, 1900

Genera
- See text

Family of crabs

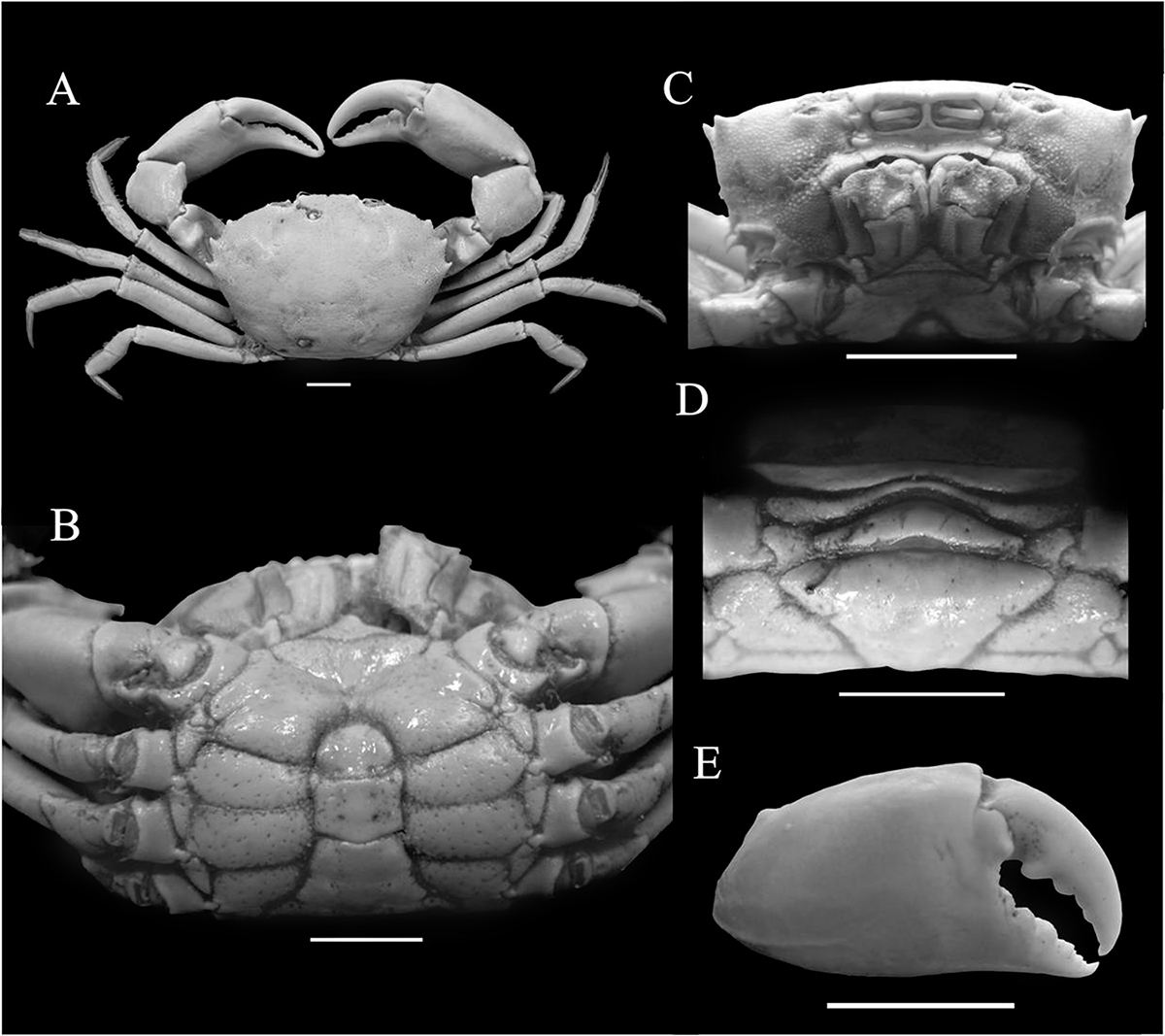
Pseudorhombila octodentata

Pseudorhombilidae is a family of crabs.

== Genera ==
Pseudorhombilidae contains the following genera:

- Bathyrhombila Hendrickx, 1998
- Chacellus Guinot, 1969
- Chasmophora Rathbun, 1914
- Cycloplax Guinot, 1969
- Cyrtoplax Rathbun, 1914
- Eucratodes A. Milne-Edwards, 1880
- Euphrosynoplax Guinot, 1969
- Garthiope Guinot, 1990
- Gonopanope Guinot, 1967
- Guinope Thoma & Felder, 2020
- Lophoxanthus A. Milne-Edwards, 1879
- Malacoplax Guinot, 1969
- Micropanope Stimpson, 1871
- Nanoplax Guinot, 1967
- Oediplax Rathbun, 1894
- Panoplax Stimpson, 1871
- Perunorhombila Števčić, 2005
- Prionoplax H. Milne Edwards, 1852
- Pseudopanopeus Felder, 2020
- Pseudorhombila H. Milne Edwards, 1837
- Robertsella Guinot, 1969
- Scopolius Števčić, 2011
- Speocarcinus Stimpson, 1859
- Tetraplax Rathbun, 1901
- Tetraxanthus Rathbun, 1898
- Thalassoplax Guinot, 1969
- Trapezioplax Guinot, 1969
