= 1934 Central America hurricane =

Category 2 Atlantic hurricane in 1934

Hurricane One 1934 Central America hurricane El Salvador hurricane
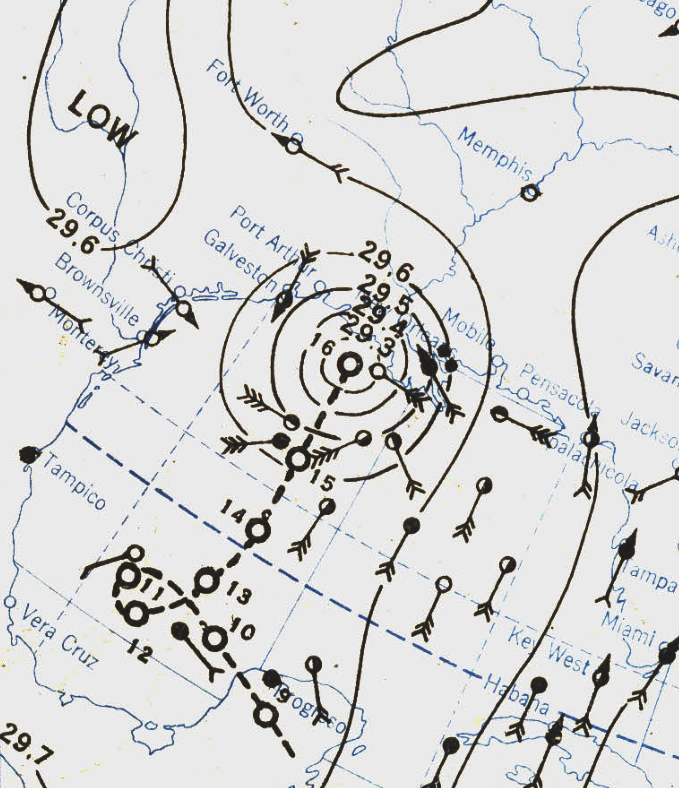
- Surface weather analysis of the hurricane approaching Louisiana on June 16

Meteorological history
- Formed: June 4, 1934
- Dissipated: June 21, 1934

Category 2 hurricane
- 1-minute sustained (SSHWS/NWS)
- Highest winds: 100 mph (155 km/h)
- Lowest pressure: 966 mbar (hPa); 28.53 inHg

Overall effects
- Fatalities: At least 506 in Central America, 10 in the U.S.
- Damage: $9.46 million (1934 USD)
- Areas affected: British Honduras, Central America (especially Honduras and El Salvador), Mexico, East Coast of the United States (particularly Louisiana and Mississippi), Atlantic Canada
- IBTrACS
- Part of the 1934 Atlantic hurricane season

The 1934 Central America hurricane (called the El Salvador hurricane by meteorologist Ivan Ray Tannehill) was a deadly tropical cyclone during the 1934 Atlantic hurricane season which caused at least 506 fatalities in Central America. Its peak strength, attained while in the Gulf of Mexico, was equivalent to a Category 2 hurricane on the modern Saffir–Simpson scale. The storm's path was erratic, beginning in the Gulf of Honduras on June 4 shortly before making its first landfall in British Honduras as a tropical storm. It then took a looping course through Guatemala before reemerging into the Gulf of Honduras on June 8. The storm struck the northeastern Yucatán Peninsula as a hurricane on June 9, crossing into the western Gulf of Mexico where its course made another loop. An accelerated northward course followed, leading to the hurricane's landfall along the Louisiana coast on June 16. It weakened over land and transitioned into an extratropical cyclone on June 18, accelerating northeast towards the Canadian Maritimes thereafter.

The storm's slow track over Central America between June 5–8 led to copious rainfall and triggered deadly floods; El Salvador and Honduras suffered most among Central American countries. Rainfall totals exceeded 25 in (640 mm) in some areas. Fourteen rivers in El Salvador rose above their banks. Entire villages in El Salvador were destroyed by the floods, with damage extensive in the country's interior and along its Pacific coast. Communications with El Salvador were downed for 36 hours. Extensive damage to crops and infrastructure occurred in and around San Salvador, where at least 2,000 people may have perished; property damage totaled $2 million (1934 USD) in the city. The hurricane was especially deadly in Honduras, primarily west and north of Tegucigalpa. In Ocotepeque, torrential rainfall caused a landslide that formed a natural dam, allowing floodwater to accumulate behind it. The dam failed on June 7, and the resulting debris flow downstream destroyed most of Ocotepeque and killed an estimated 468 people. The Yucatán Peninsula's sparse population mitigated significant damage when the hurricane struck Quintana Roo on June 9, though crops were impacted between Progreso and Payo Obispo.

Much of the shores of the Gulf of Mexico were affected by the hurricane due to its erratic path. High winds and coastal floods stemming from swells generated by the storm reached Tamaulipas and Brazos Island along the western extents of Gulf of Mexico, while a stationary front tapped into moisture from the storm to produce heavy rainfall across southern Georgia and Florida. The worst of the hurricane's impacts associated with its landfall in Louisiana were caused by the storm's rainbands that raked across Louisiana and Mississippi ahead of the hurricane's center. Six people were killed in Louisiana and four were killed in Mississippi. Approximately 3,000–7,000 homes were damaged in Louisiana. The storm continued to produce high winds and flooding rainfall as it tracked northeast across the Mid-Atlantic states and into Canada, causing power outages and property damage.

== Meteorological history ==
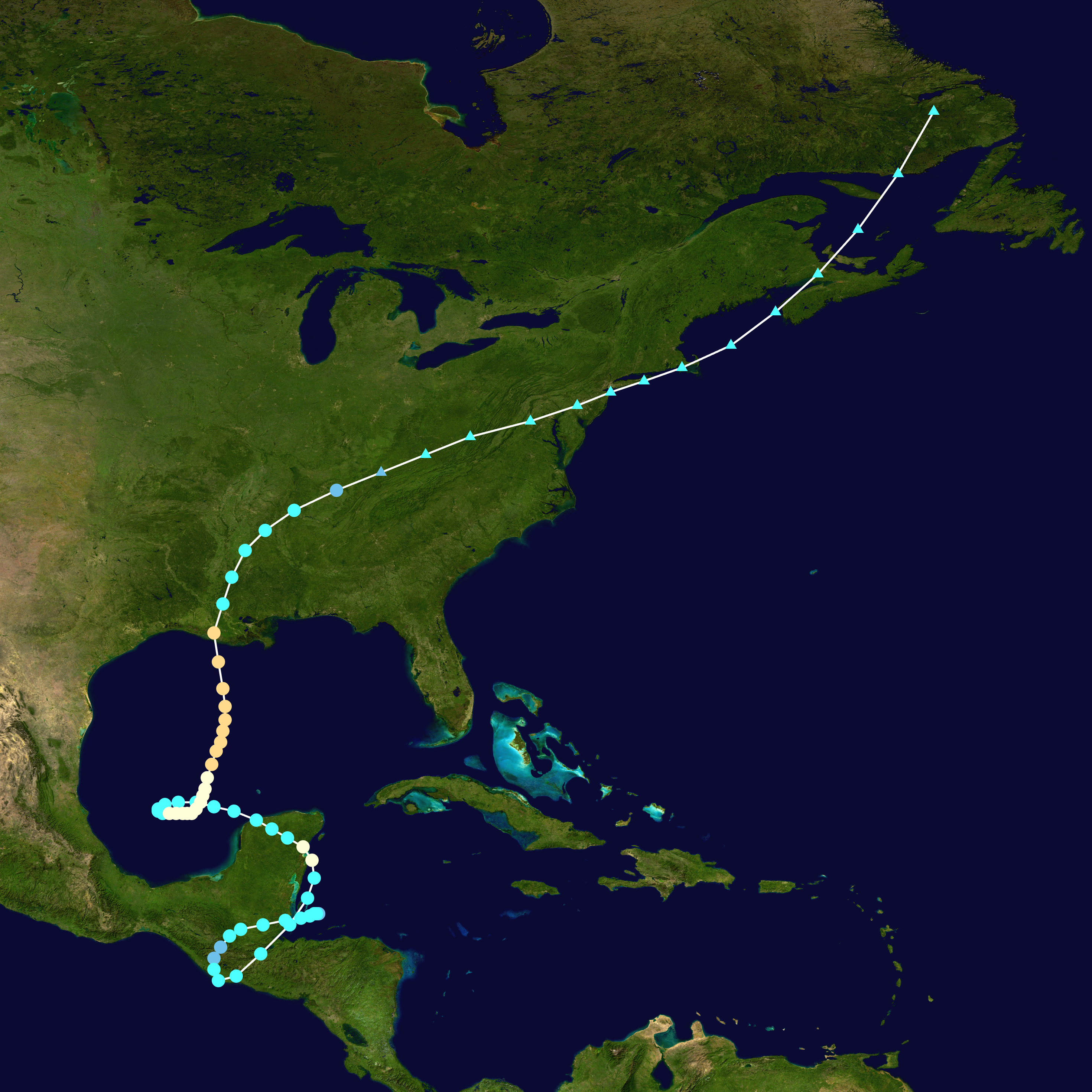
Map plotting the storm's track and intensity, according to the Saffir–Simpson scale Map key Saffir–Simpson scale Tropical depression (≤38 mph, ≤62 km/h) Tropical storm (39–73 mph, 63–118 km/h) Category 1 (74–95 mph, 119–153 km/h) Category 2 (96–110 mph, 154–177 km/h) Category 3 (111–129 mph, 178–208 km/h) Category 4 (130–156 mph, 209–251 km/h) Category 5 (≥157 mph, ≥252 km/h) Unknown Storm type Tropical cyclone Subtropical cyclone Extratropical cyclone, remnant low, tropical disturbance, or monsoon depression

The circumstances leading to the storm's formation in the western Caribbean Sea were unclear, marked only by inclement weather in the Gulf of Honduras. An area of low pressure developed in the area and organized into a tropical depression by 12:00 UTC on June 4, strengthening into a tropical storm six hours later. The following day, the cyclone made landfall near Belize City in the British Honduras with maximum sustained winds of 50 mph (80 km/h). Over the next two days, the storm took a looping path primarily through Guatemala. Although interaction with land initially weakened the cyclone, the storm's winds quickly increased when it passed near Guatemala's Pacific coast. It re-entered the Gulf of Honduras on a northward path early on June 8 and strengthened into a hurricane by June 9. Concurrently, it curved towards the west, leading to a landfall along the Yucatán Peninsula on June 9 with winds of 80 mph (130 km/h).

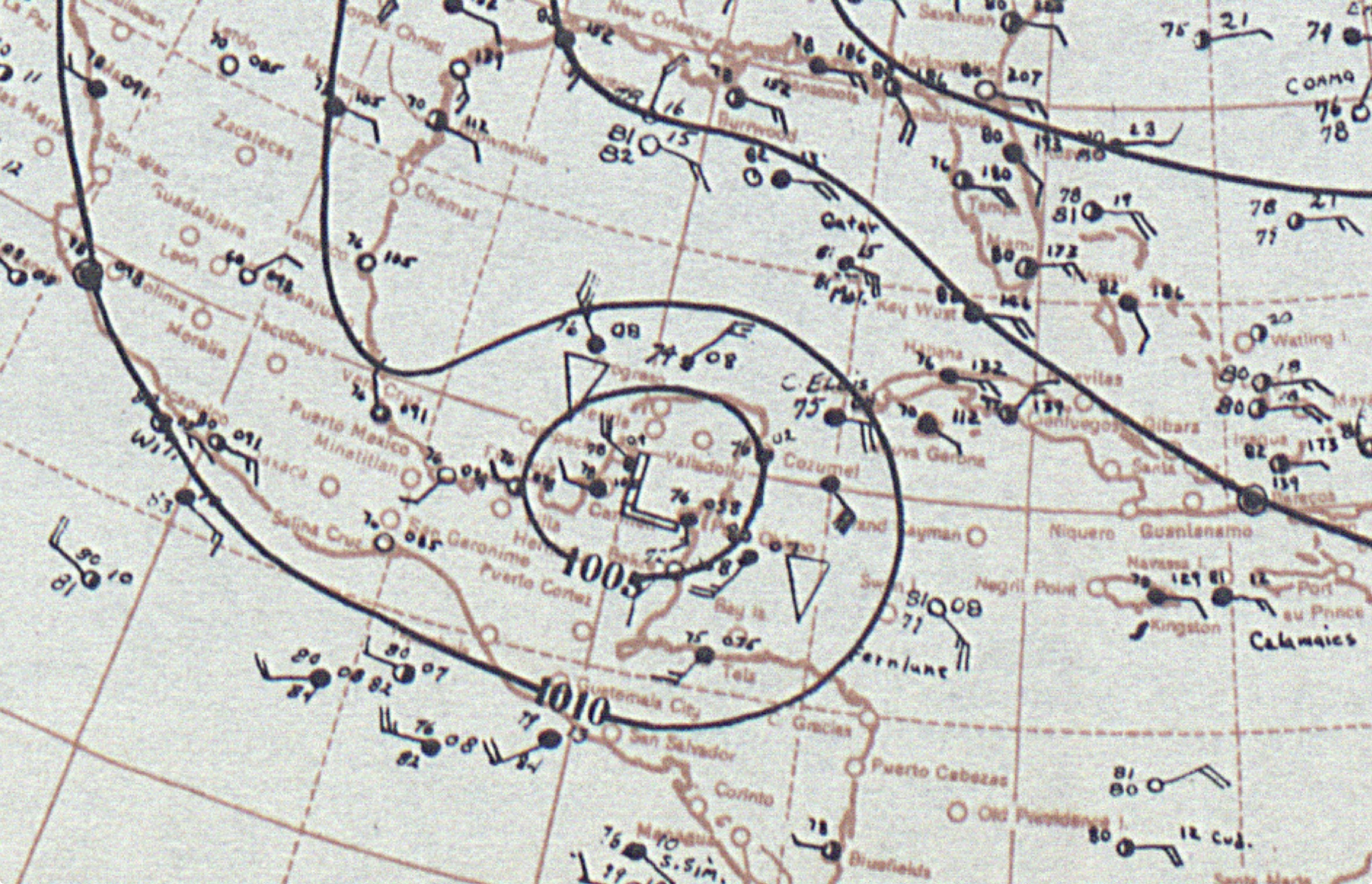
Surface weather map of the hurricane shortly after landfall in the Yucatan Peninsula on June 9

The next day, the system moved into the Gulf of Mexico as a tropical storm on a northwestward heading. Two days later, the storm executed another loop, restrengthening into a hurricane before taking a northward course. Observations from ships in the vicinity of the hurricane were suggestive of an intensifying system. On June 14, the storm attained winds of 100 mph (160 km/h), ranking it as a Category 2 hurricane intensity on the modern Saffir–Simpson scale. It held this intensity for two days and made landfall along the coast of Louisiana near Jeanerette at 19:00 UTC on June 16. Upon landfall, the storm's barometric pressure was 966 mbar (hPa; 28.53 inHg). The hurricane weakened and accelerated towards the northeast after moving ashore, though the swampy terrain of coastal Louisiana curtailed the weakening process. The storm's winds decreased below hurricane strength on June 17 and fell further to tropical depression strength on June 18 as the system tracked across Mississippi and Tennessee. Its entanglement with an approaching cold front on June 18 signaled the storm's transition into an extratropical cyclone. The storm continued towards the northeastern United States and the Canadian Maritimes, tracking across Nova Scotia and the northern shores of the Gulf of St. Lawrence before it was last documented on June 21 over Labrador.

== Impact ==
=== Central America and Southeastern Mexico ===
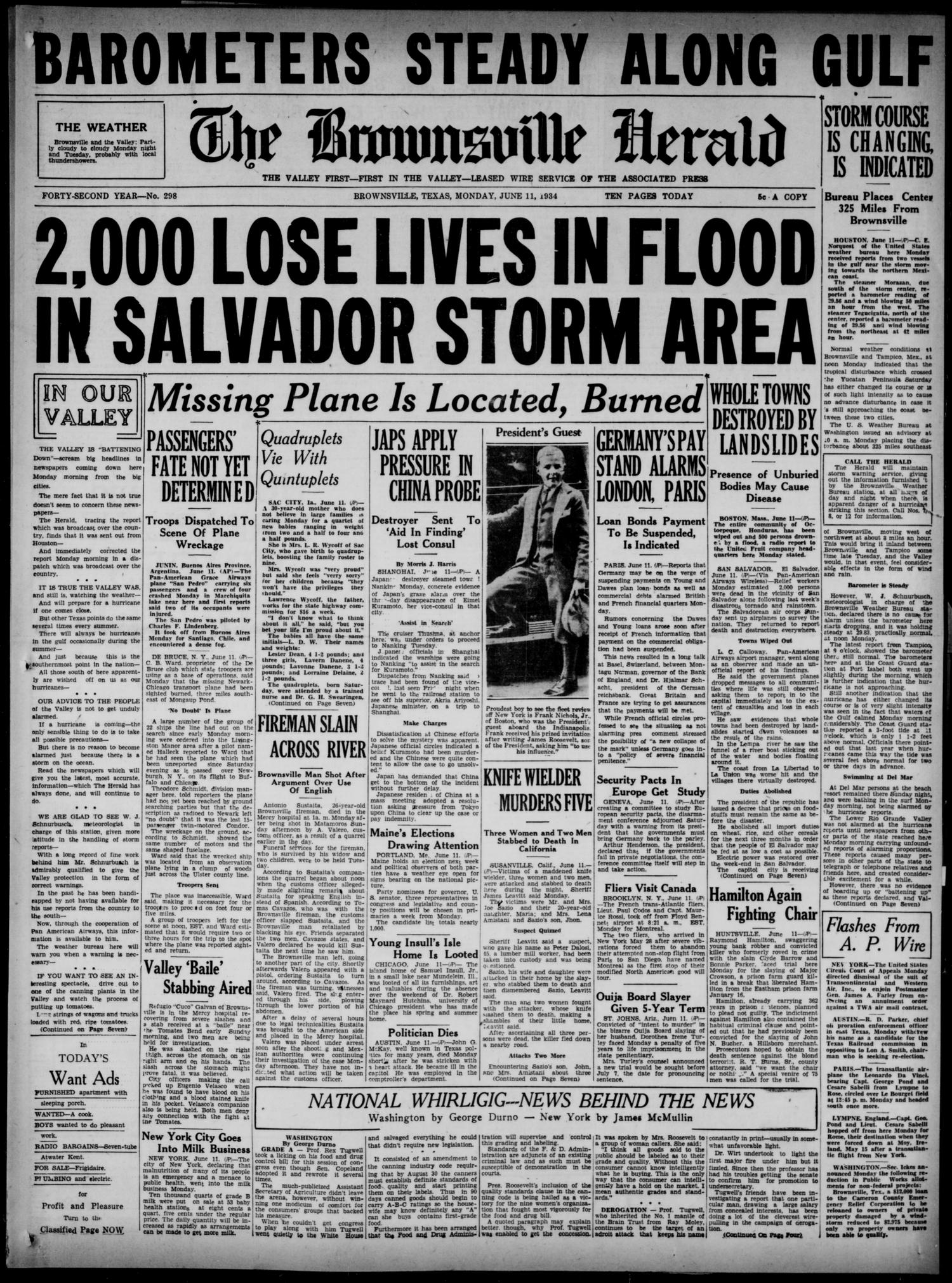
Front Page of The Brownsville Herald on June 11

Between June 5–8, the center of the storm slowly tracked across British Honduras, southeastern Mexico, and Guatemala, with estimated peak sustained winds of 50 mph (80 km/h) along this path. These peak winds were measured in San Salvador, El Salvador. Lesser winds of 34 mph (55 km/h) were recorded in Belize City, British Honduras, where the storm initially made landfall. The slow-moving tropical cyclone produced torrential rainfall, resulting in widespread flooding that killed several thousand people. Estimates of the death toll in Central America vary; a list of the deadliest Atlantic tropical cyclones compiled by meteorologists Edward Rappaport and Jose Fernandez-Partagás in 1996 indicates that the hurricane may have caused over 3,000 fatalities, with a low-end estimate of 506. Between 1,000 and 3,000 casualties occurred across Honduras according to the U.S. Weather Bureau's report in the Monthly Weather Review. Relief workers in Honduras suggested approximately 2,000 fatalities occurred, while reporting by the Associated Press estimated at least 2,000 deaths near San Salvador with at least 2,500 deaths across Central America. Rainfall totals exceeded 25 in (640 mm) in some locations, increased by the effects of the mountains of the Trifinio region. In El Salvador, the storm contributed to the country's wettest year on record; this record stood until 2005. Rivers and lakes rose 45–60 ft (14–18 m) from the excessive rains. Banana and timber regions were heavily impacted by the storm.

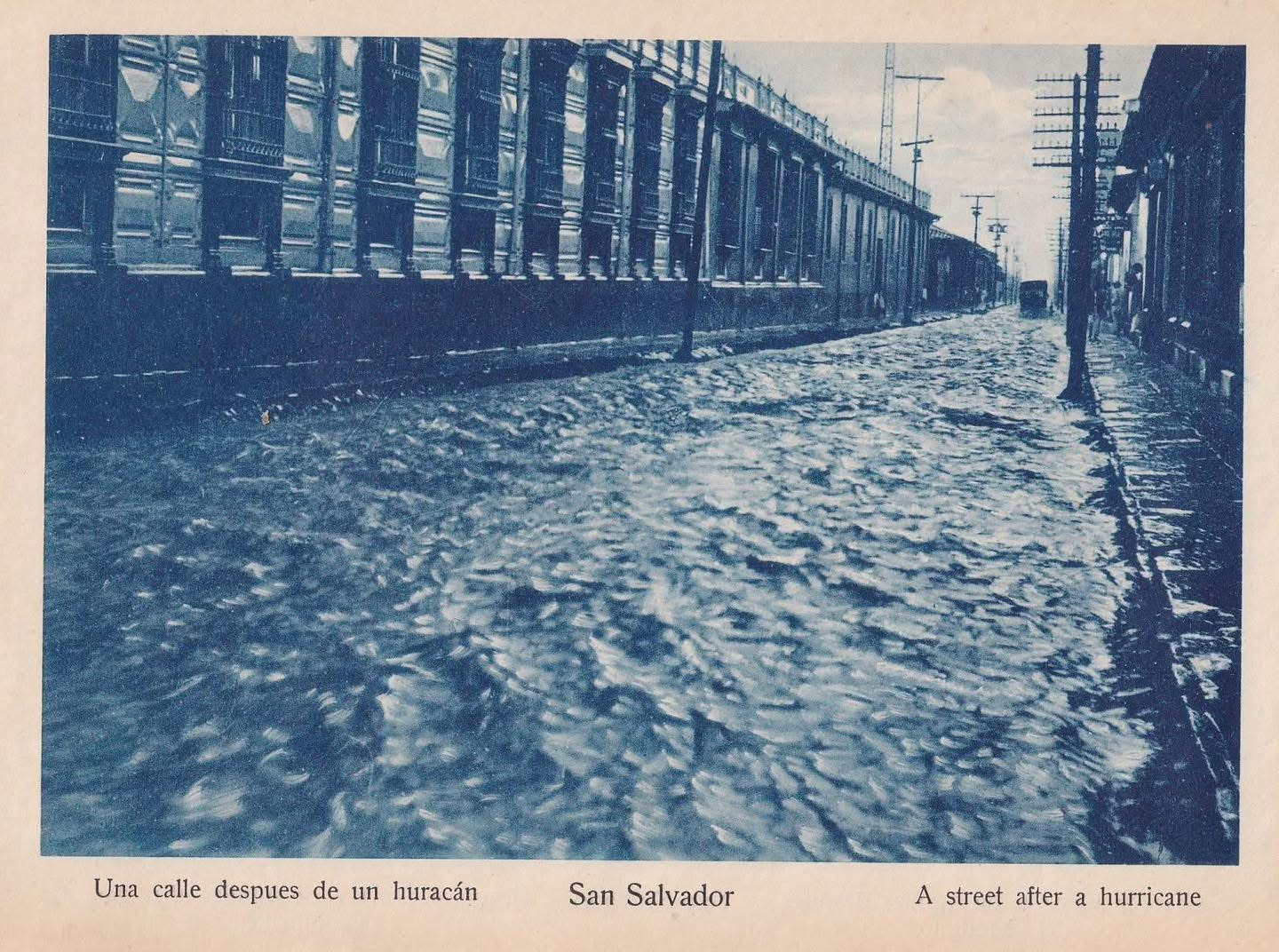
A street flooded in San Salvador after the hurricane

The worst effects were felt in El Salvador and Honduras, with lesser impacts occurring in Guatemala. The heaviest damage in El Salvador occurred in the departments of Cabañas, Cuscatlán, La Paz, San Miguel, San Vicente, and Usulután. Fourteen rivers throughout the country overflowed their banks, with floods along the Lempa proving to be particularly devastating in northwestern El Salvador. Entire villages in El Salvador were destroyed, including those along the Pacific coast of El Salvador from La Libertad to La Unión. On a single estate along the coast, 100,000 head of cattle perished. All Pacific ports were flooded; few buildings withstood the storm in Acajutla, whose port was rendered inoperable. Verapaz was wrecked by floods rushing down the slopes of a nearby volcano. Power lines were brought down by the storm, with communications company All America Cables reporting an inability to connect with the country for 36 hours.

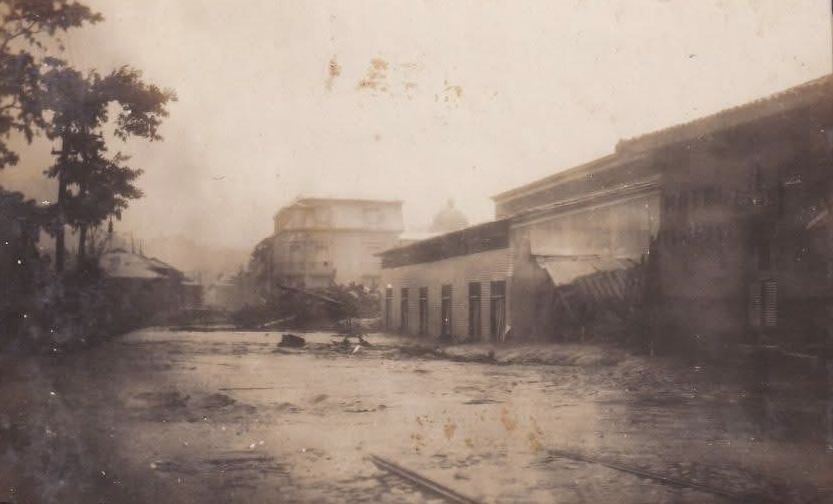
Flooding and damage in El Salvador during the storm

A report from San Salvador described "considerable damage" arising from flooding. Property damage totaled $2 million (1934 USD) and initial reports tallied 500 people rendered homeless near the city. Large buildings in the city were damaged and homes were washed away in the residential districts of Ilopango and Soyapango. The 30-foot (9 m) rise of Lake Ilopango destroyed buildings along its banks. Similarly, flooding along the banks of Lake Güija and the Coatepeque Caldera washed away settlements along their shores. A partially-completed stadium intended for the Central American and Caribbean Games in December 1934 was flooded, forcing to event to be delayed to March 1935. Substantial damage was also wrought to crops around San Salvador. Long segments of the international railroad of Central America were washed out, requiring three months of repairs; one train on its tracks derailed. Bridges were torn apart by the flooding, with washouts and landslides reported on railways and highways. Washouts occurred on nearly all roads throughout the country.

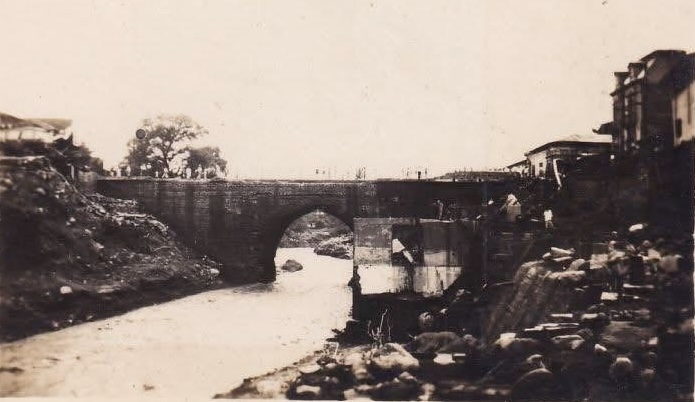
Damaged buildings and mudslides after the flooding in El Salvador from the storm

On June 8, martial law was declared in El Salvador, with an early curfew enforced in San Salvador. Electricity was restored in the city between June 9–10 while potable water was made available twice daily. Churches and other public buildings served as havens for those displaced by the storm in San Salvador. The government of El Salvador seized all gasoline in San Salvador to ensure adequate supplies for emergency transport. A decree from the president enacted price controls on food and suspended import duties on cereal for three months. Hundreds of men were pressed into service by the presidents to repair highways. The American Red Cross contributed $10,000 towards relief for victims of the hurricane in the country.

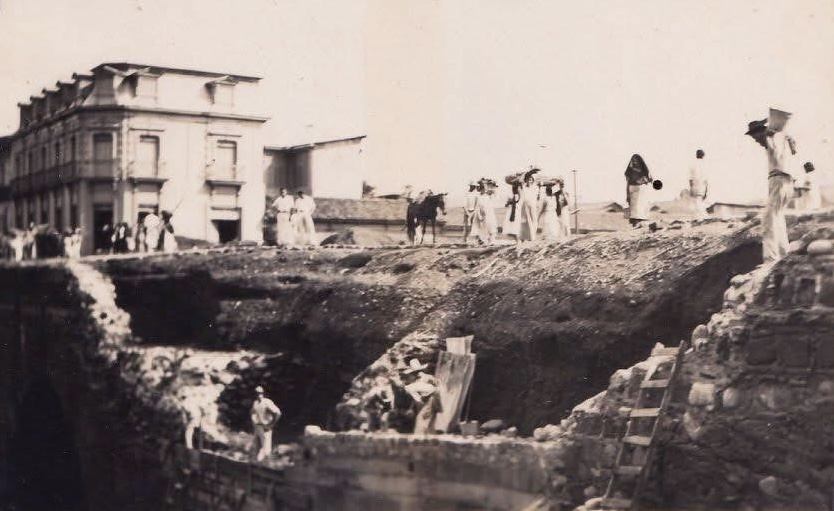
A part of a bridge sustained damage in El Salvador after the storm

Rains from the hurricane affected Honduras for nine days. The storm disrupted transportation service in Honduras, completely isolating Tegucigalpa. Low-lying areas of the capital city were flooded as the Río Grande quickly rose due to heavy rainfall. The storm destroyed homes in San Juancito. Banana-growing regions along the Atlantic coast were also heavily impacted; plantations near Santiago were inundated in floodwaters, and large plantations owned by the United Fruit Company were destroyed. Rail service to these areas was suspended due to the flooding. The worst impacts in Honduras occurred in districts west and north of Tegucigalpa. On June 4, 25.2 in (64 cm) of rain fell in Ocotepeque, Honduras, triggering a landslide in a mountain valley above the city. The landslide acted as a natural dam along the southern slope of Cerro El Pital . Rainfall accumulated in a lake formed behind this temporary obstruction as the storm meandered over Central America. On June 7, the barrier burst, producing a debris flow that killed an estimated 468 people, representing over 10 percent of Ocotepeque's population. The town was largely destroyed, with all buildings succumbing to the flood except for the town church. Despite the magnitude of the disaster, contemporary reports were scarce due to the city's remote location and lack of communications. The destruction caused the city to be relocated 2.5 mi (4 km) north, where it was named Nueva Ocotepeque; the former city was later resettled slightly outside the floodplain of the Río Marchala and renamed as Antigua Ocotepeque.

The scene that meets the eyes of the survivors is most grievous. Everywhere are groups of persons, hungry, almost naked, seeking among the corpses still floating some loved one they will not see again. The church remains standing; all else is ruin, misery, mud...

— Report from an aerial surveyor describing the damage in Ocotepeque and published by the Associated Press

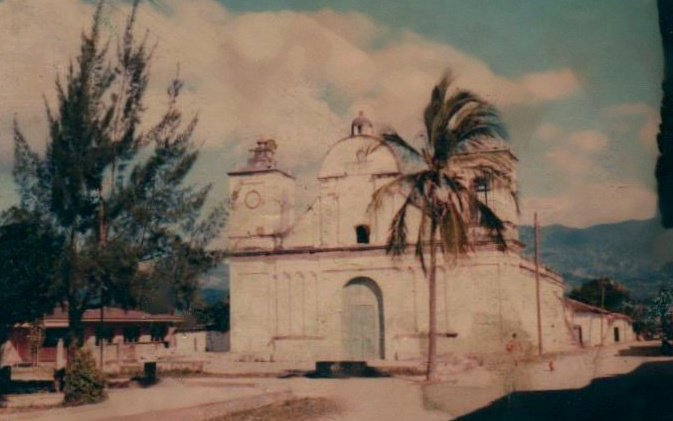
The church in Ocotepeque was the only building left intact in the city following a destructive debris flow triggered by the storm

The Lempa and Ulúa rivers rose significantly due to the rainfall, with the latter rising 45 ft (14 m). Residents of Pimienta fled to a hill to avoid advancing floodwaters only to be drowned there as the Ulúa River continued to rise. Hundreds of cattle also drowned in Pimienta. More than 125 buildings were destroyed in the city with property losses estimated at $500,000. At Villanueva, floods were 6–15 ft (1.8–4.6 m) deep. Honduran president Tiburcio Carías Andino appealed to American officials in Panama for tents due to the displacement of Ocotepeque residents. A total of 65 tents were delivered by 11 bombers to Tegucigalpa on June 16. Serum for combating disease in storm-stricken Honduras and El Salvador was prepared and sent to San Salvador for distribution. The American Red Cross allocated $1,000 towards relief for those affected by the hurricane in Honduras. Six people were killed in the Mexican state of Chiapas following a plane crash, possibly due to strong winds from the storm. After completing its loop over Central America and reemerging into the Caribbean Sea, the storm made landfall as a Category 1 hurricane on Quintana Roo on June 9, producing hurricane-force winds inland over the Yucatán Peninsula. Due to the region's sparse population, there were no reports of significant damage. The storm damaged crops between Progreso and Payo Obispo. Ships were sunk in the harbor at Progreso.

=== Northern Mexico and Northern America ===
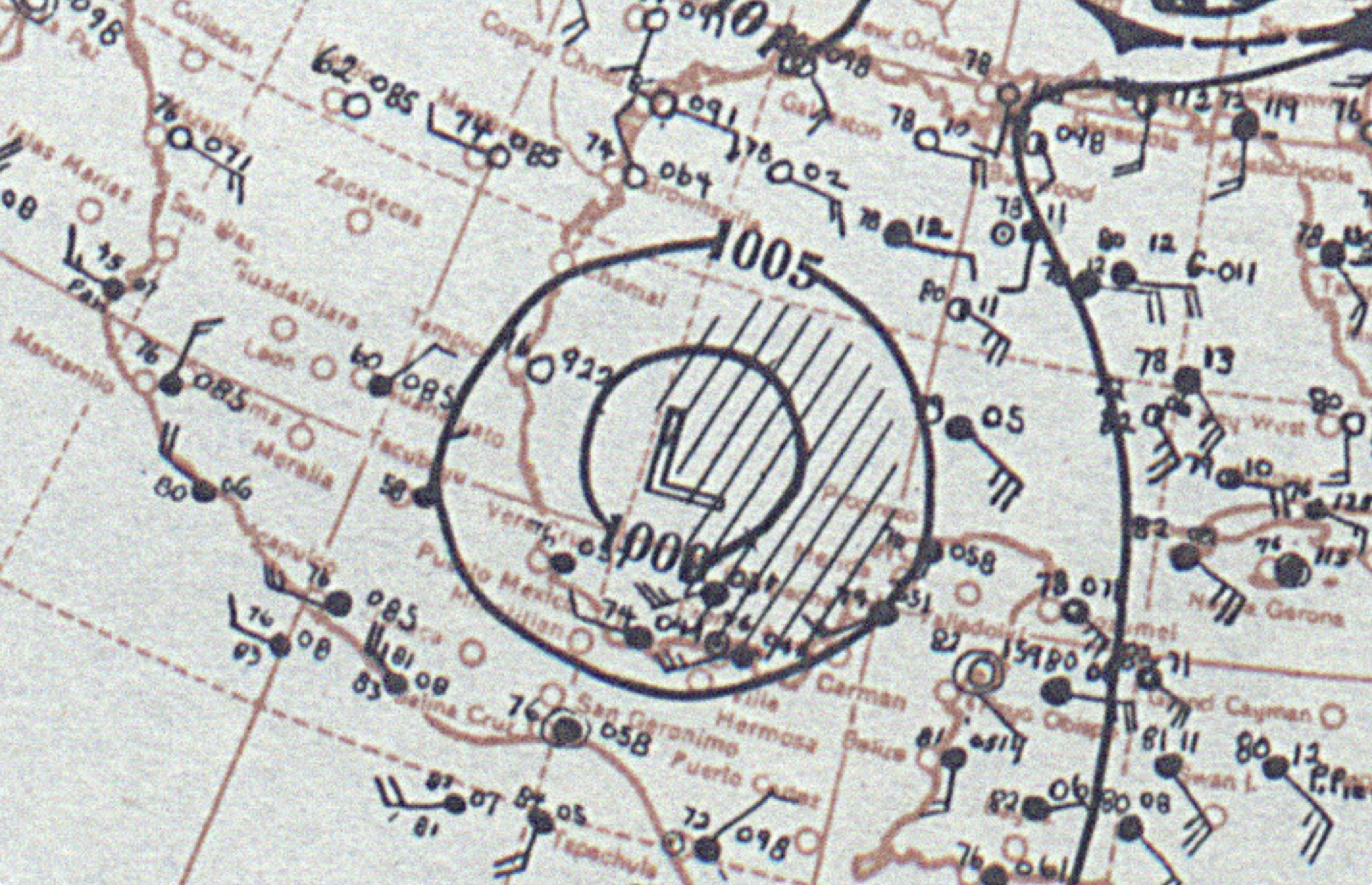
Surface weather map of the hurricane over the Bay of Campeche on June 12

Along the U.S. Gulf Coast ahead of the storm, a semi-stationary weather front across southern Georgia and northern Florida drew moist air from the hurricane, causing heavy rains over central and northern Florida; the maximum rainfall total in the state was 20.9 in (530 mm) as recorded in St. Leo. The storm's trajectory on June 11 suggested a possible track towards the Mexican coast between Tampico and the Mexico–United States border. Swells ahead of the storm flooded roads in low-lying areas of Brazos Island and cut off the beach at Playa Miramar. Buildings were boarded up in the Rio Grande Valley in preparation for the hurricane. In Tampico, hospitals, police, and the Red Cross prepared for the storm. Bus fleets were readied for potential evacuations. High winds ultimately reached the coast of Tamaulipas on June 13 with little impact.

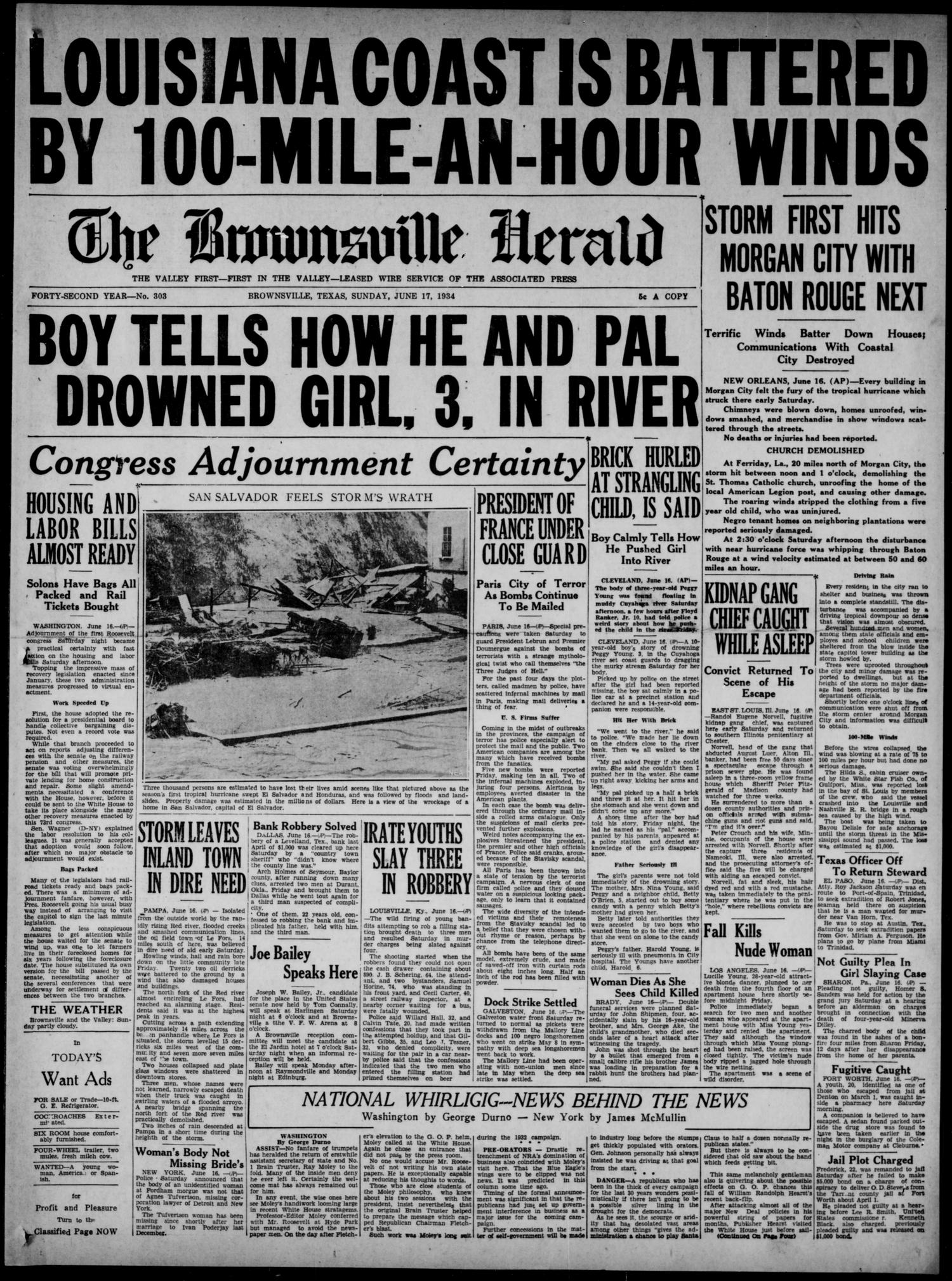
Front Page of The Brownsville Herald on June 17, covering the impacts from the hurricane in Louisiana and El Salvador

Northeast storm warnings were issued for the U.S. Gulf Coast between Pensacola, Florida, and Morgan City, Louisiana, on June 15. Hurricane warnings were later issued on June 16 for the Louisiana coast between Grand Isle and Vermilion Bay. These warnings were disseminated via radiophone, telegraph, and telephone. A cutter from the United States Coast Guard was sent to alert ships of the storm's approach at Mobile Bay. The hurricane moved ashore Louisiana at Category 2 intensity on June 16, passing over Jeanerette, west of Morgan City. Along the coast, shrimp-drying platforms and oil derricks incurred $105,000 in damage. However, the hurricane's small size reduced the resulting storm surge, leading to maximum storm tide heights of 2–3 ft (0.61–0.91 m) between Grand Isle and Vermilion Bay. The storm's most destructive effects were associated with squalls that swept across Louisiana and Mississippi in advance of the storm's landfall. These localized storms felled trees throughout New Orleans. Winds in Morgan City reached 68 mph (109 km/h) as the hurricane made landfall. There, homes lost their roofs and chimneys. A rainfall maximum of 9.6 in (240 mm) was recorded in Lafayette. Six people were killed in Louisiana and the property damage toll reached $2.605 million. The American Red Cross estimated that 75–150 homes were destroyed and that another 3,000–7,000 were damaged. An additional $1.5 million damage toll was inflicted upon crops, including corn and cotton. Corn and cotton crops recovered soon after the hurricane's passage.

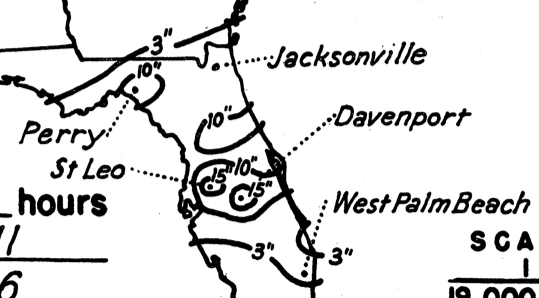
Map of rainfall totals in Florida from June 11-16, 1934, to the northeast of the storm

Squalls associated with the hurricane killed four people and injuring many others in Mississippi. Gusty winds destroyed and unroofed homes in Natchez. The storms produced heavy rainfall across western parts of the state, elevating the Pearl River above flood stage by 1–3.5 ft (0.30–1.07 m) between Monticello and Jackson. Mississippi crops sustained $3 million in losses. In Tennessee's Red River Valley, crops and roads sustained $250,000 in damage from excessive rainfall. Cedar Hill, Tennessee, recorded 10 in (250 mm) of rain in 14 hours; this was the heaviest June rain event in state history. A 50 yd (46 m)-wide tornado struck a rural area north of Joelton, Tennessee on June 17, damaging a few farm buildings. The tropical storm proceeded to produce strong winds and rainfall over New England and the Mid-Atlantic states. A 50 mph (80 km/h)-wind was measured in Atlantic City, New Jersey, as the storm emerged into the Atlantic. The extratropical remnants of the hurricane passed over the Canadian Maritimes with sustained winds of up to 40 mph (65 km/h). The storm caused power outages between Sorel and Montreal, Quebec. Poles were toppled along the Canadian National Railway between the two cities. A fire caused by the storm destroyed three barns near Verchères; eight other barns were destroyed throughout Quebec. The storm also caused flooding in Ontario, inundating some of the main streets in Toronto.

== See also ==
- List of Category 2 Atlantic hurricanes
- Hurricane Mitch (1998) – A Category 5 hurricane that caused catastrophic flooding and loss of life in Honduras and Nicaragua
- Hurricanes Eta and Iota (2020) – Two Category 4 hurricanes that caused catastrophic damage in Nicaragua and Honduras just two weeks apart
