= Soledad, Honduras =

Soledad
- Municipality
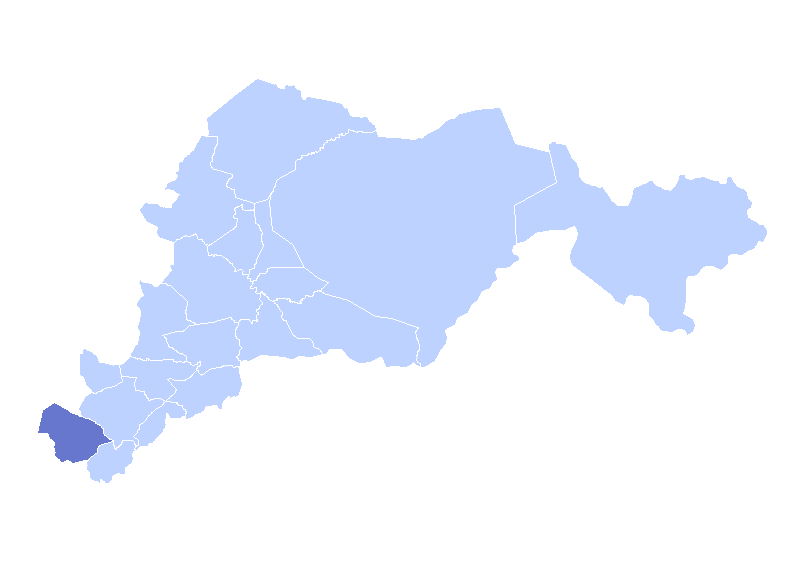

- Location in Honduras
- Coordinates: 13°35′N 87°7′W
- Country: Honduras
- Department: El Paraíso
- Municipality: Soledad
- City Title: 1826

Area
  - Total: 169 km^{2} (65 sq mi)

Population (2015)
  - Total: 9,353
  - Density: 55.3/km^{2} (143/sq mi)

Soledad (Spanish pronunciation: [soleˈðað]) is a municipality in the Honduran department of El Paraíso.

== Economy ==
The main economic activities of Soledad are centered around agriculture and the production of luffa. Soledad is of the principal growers of luffa in Honduras, which is locally known as paste.

== Population ==
Population of Soledad by census year
	Men	Women	Total
1901	1,670	1,762	3,432
1910	1,575	1,689	3,264
1916	1,678	1,816	3,494
1926	1,959	2,121	4,080
1930	2,040	2,271	4,311
1935	2,233	2,207	4,400
1940	2,440	2,660	5,100
1945	2,598	2,807	5,405
1950	2,920	3,198	6,118
1961	3,487	3,633	7,120
1974	3,747	3,963	7,710
1988	4,429	4,478	8,907
2001	4,769	4,773	9,542
2013	4,756	4,594	9,350

== Notable people from Soledad ==
- Chelato Uclés, Honduran football player and coach.
