= San Antonio de Flores, El Paraíso =

San Antonio de Flores
- Municipality
- Location in Honduras
- Coordinates: 13°43′N 86°53′W
- Country: Honduras
- Department: El Paraíso

Area
  - Total: 155 km^{2} (60 sq mi)

Population (2015)
  - Total: 5,674
  - Density: 36.6/km^{2} (94.8/sq mi)

San Antonio de Flores is a municipality in the Honduran department of El Paraíso.

It is located between mountains and it is close to the border with Nicaragua.
