= Alauca =

- Municipality
- Location within Honduras
- Coordinates: 13°51′N 86°41′W
- Country: Honduras
- Department: El Paraíso

Area
  - Total: 170 km^{2} (66 sq mi)

Population (2015)
  - Total: 9,273
  - Density: 55/km^{2} (140/sq mi)

Alauca (Spanish pronunciation: [aˈlawka]) is a municipality in the Honduran department of El Paraíso.
