= Chelato Uclés =

Honduran footballer and coach (1940–2021)

Personal information
- Full name: José de la Paz Herrera Uclés
- Date of birth: 21 November 1940
- Place of birth: Soledad, Honduras
- Date of death: 28 April 2021 (aged 80)
- Place of death: Tegucigalpa, Honduras

Senior career*
Years	Team	Apps	(Gls)
1965–1966	Atlético Español		

Managerial career
- 1969–1970: Motagua
- 1970–1971: Olimpia
- 1971–1975: Real España
- 1975–1977: Marathón
- 1977–1980: Broncos
- 1980–1983: Honduras
- 1983–1984: Universidad
- 1985: Honduras
- 1987–1989: Marathón
- 1990: Santos Laguna
- 1990–1991: Cartaginés
- 1992–1994: Olimpia
- 1995–1996: Independiente
- 1996–1998: Olimpia
- 1999: Honduras U-20
- 1999–2000: Platense
- 2001–2002: Marathón
- 2003–2004: Olimpia
- 2004–2007: Honduras
- 2008: Marathón
- 2010–2011: Belize
- 2011: Marathón
- 2012: Real España
- * Club domestic league appearances and goals

José de la Paz Herrera Uclés (21 November 1940 – 28 April 2021), commonly known as Chelato Uclés, was a Honduran footballer and coach.

== Early years ==
He grew up in Soledad, Honduras, a small town of the municipality of El Paraíso in extreme poverty. From Soledad, his family moved to Comayagüela, where he was introduced to football. He dedicated his life to football, choosing it over baseball in a time when baseball was very popular in Honduras. He was the brother of politician Doris Gutiérrez.

He played the 1965–66 season in the national league for Atlético Español.

Herrera's nickname was given to him by a friend, Danieri Flores, to whom Chelato tried to nickname "Danilerato"; Flores responded with "Chelato", which has since stuck as his nickname.

== Managerial career ==
He made his debut as manager on 14 December 1969, when he replaced "Popo" Godoy as manager of Motagua.

=== Honduran National League ===
During José's career as technical director of National League teams, he made history with three different clubs. However, he failed in his attempt at taking a couple of small teams to win the championship.

The first part of Chelato's history in National League begins in 1974, when he won his first title with C.D. España. With it, Chelato also delivered to the city of San Pedro Sula their first championship ever, after defeating F.C. Motagua of Tegucigalpa by the score of 1–0 in their final match.

He took C.D. Olimpia, to win the championship title in 1992. Later, he added two more championships with Olimpia, in 1996–97 and 2003–04.

By 2001, "Chelato" took charge of C.D. Marathón. At the moment of his arrival he declared that "It would be pretty to leave Marathón being a champion." Those were very optimistic words for team that at that moment was going through a very difficult stretch; fighting to not being relegated to second division. Nevertheless, at the end of the season, "Chelato" kept his word, and the team became the new champs of the Honduran National League.

In spite of all the triumphs obtained with big teams, Chelato never could carry a small team to win a championship title. In 1983, he left Club Universidad at the doorstep of the title. And later, in the 1990s the disappointment was for Platense.

Herrera is also known for a wild experiment that was never seen before in the history of Honduran football. He disguised a team (Broncos of Choluteca), as the Honduras national football team and played a full tournament. At the end; the whole experience was as positive for him as it was for the players.

Clearly, Herrera had a lot of success in the Honduran national league. His extensive participation as coach, took him to win a total of 5 championships and to have a fighting chance in six tournaments. His record is only surpassed by the "old fox" of the Honduran National League, Carlos Padilla Velásquez.

=== 1982 World Cup ===
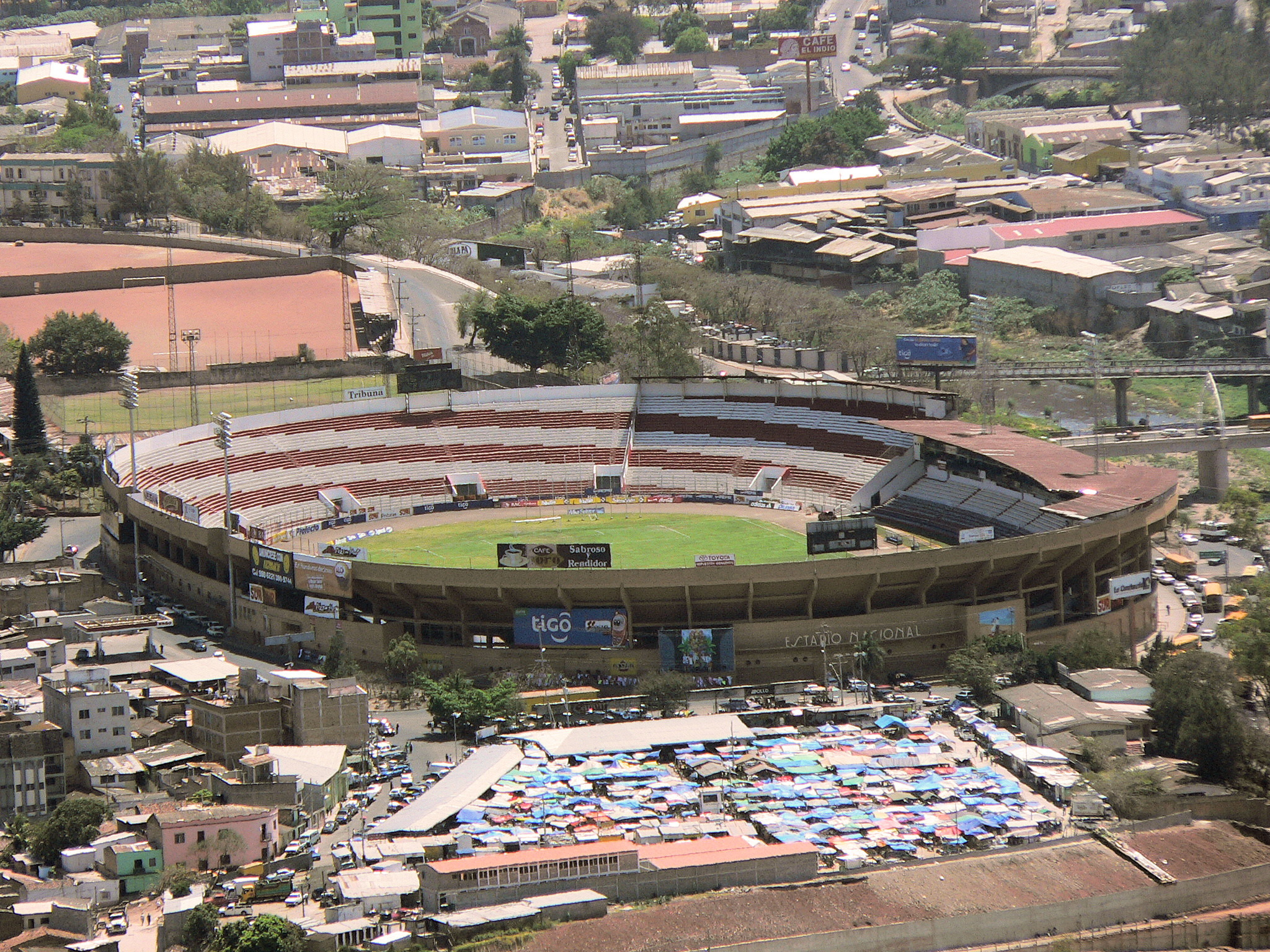
Estadio Nacional de Tegucigalpa: Venue of CONCACAF's Final Round in 1981.

In 1981 Herrera became the only Honduran coach to carry Honduras to the World Cup. For that task, Chelato and his players had to overcome two different phases in the qualifying rounds. The preliminary phase was long and grueling. The second and last was relatively easy; once in the World Cup, Honduras had an acceptable tournament.

For the pre World Cup tournaments Chelato used as his base; the players from Real C.D. España, and the members from the 1977 Youth World Cup played in Tunisia. Among them were: Jaime Villegas, Anthony Costly, and Julio Cesar Arzu among many others.

In the pre- qualifying round Honduras faced: El Salvador, Guatemala, Panama and Costa Rica in round trip games; being the match against the 'Guatemala,' the key game that gave the Hondurans the classification to the final round. This game was won by the scoreboard of 1–0, with goal of Jimmy Bailey and a stupendous participation of the goalkeeper: Jimmy Steward.

At the end of the tournament, Honduras netted 15 goals and received 5. Drew games against: Costa Rica, and Guatemala, lost against El Salvador national team and won the remaining encounters. Once the preliminary phase was finished, Honduras received the home field advantage of the Final Round. This event took place at stadium Nacional de Tegucigalpa.

In this tournament Honduras had as its rivals the following teams: Mexico, El Salvador, Haiti, Cuba and Canada. In the inaugural match against Haiti, Honduras won by the score of 4–0, then beat the Cubans for 2–0, as well as the Canadians for 2–1. Honduras assured its classification to the World Cup with a tie (0-0) to El Salvador. In the final match, Honduras tied against Mexico 0-0. This signified the elimination of the Mexicans from the 1982 FIFA World Cup, and El Salvador would accompany Honduras to Spain.

For the World Cup, Chelato included in the staff two important players who did not participate in the final qualifying round: Gilberto Yearwood who at the time was playing in Spain, and high-scoring player: Porfirio Betancourt in substitution of Jimmy James Bailey who suffered a severe injury.

After the disastrous fall of El Salvador national team in their presentation before Hungary for 1–10, many experts doubted the capacity of the other representative of CONCACAF (The Honduras National Team). But this did not last long, because on 16 June in its first game, played at stadium Luís Casanova of Valencia; Honduras showed great skills against Spain.

From the very beginning the team put the host country up against the wall. – A goal by Hector Zelaya in the first half, forced the Spanish team to be in the attack. In the end; the tie was achieved by the Spaniards through a penalty kick; charged by the Argentine referee Arturo Andrés Iturralde against Honduras. The match ended up in a tie (1-1).

On 21 June Honduras played its second match at stadium The Romareda of Zaragoza, against Northern Ireland. After being down in the scoreboard for a while, Chelato Uclés sent substitute player Tony Laing to the field, at a moment when a corner kick was going to be forwarded. Laing came in; and just headed the ball into the net, to establish the tie and final score against the Irish Team.

In spite of the good presentation of Chelato's team in the first two matches, this was later affected in the final game against the Yugoslavs. A doubtful penalty kick marked by the Chilean referee Gastón Edmundo, against Honduras; determined the scoreboard in favor of Yugoslavia (0-1). This marked the elimination of Honduras from the tournament. Despite what happened in the last game, the Honduran people recognized the good work of Chelato Uclés and his team.

After the Spanish experience, the efforts of Chelato Uclés, for returning to a World Cup with the Honduras national team ended in failures. The first one of these; was for Mexico 1986; where Chelato's team was eliminated by Canada national team. The following elimination of Honduras with Chelato in command was in the qualifying rounds of Italy 1990. In that opportunity, was Trinidad and Tobago who knocked out Honduras. The last elimination of Honduras with Chelato as coach was in the qualifiers for Germany 2006.

=== 2006 World Cup ===
The process of Germany 2006 had the direct and indirect participation, of Jose de La Paz Herrera. Most of which was to a large extent negative, for the interests of the Honduran football.

The process started when, the sports press put pressure on the president of the Honduran football federation; Rafael Leonardo Callejas to hire Chelato, because he was considered to be a "good and cheap coach." In the end Callejas caved in.

The first test for Chelato in this new process was Copa UNCAF of Panama in 2003. This was also a qualifier tournament for the 2003 Gold Cup. But Ucles’ new process with the national team did not start well, Honduras lost 3 out of 5 matches in the tournament, finishing fourth. This forced the team to play off games against Trinidad & Tobago and Martinique. The team was supposed to win these two matches, if it were to participate in the upcoming Gold Cup.

After this setback, Chelato was criticized harshly by the Honduran press, reason why on 22 February, he said "from the beginning everything was lost". Because the players never did what he commanded them to do. Later on, Chelato said that he was ready to leave his post as the Honduras national football team coach, if the federation asked him to do so.

=== Chelato versus Bora ===
When the national team returned to Honduras from Panama, the directory of the federation under Callejas' control once again was pressed by a sector of the media, to force Chelato out. Callejas did so, and replaced him with interim Coach: Edwin Pavón.

Pavon took control of the national team and qualified it, to the Gold Cup, by getting positive results against Trinidad and Tobago and Martinique. After the participation of Pavón in the Mexico's Gold Cup, the directory of the Federation named Bora Milutinović as the new Honduran coach.

The election of Milutinović caused a tremendous malaise, among Chelato's followers and the coach himself. Both, (Chelato and the sports press) would then be allies; in open opposition against the Serbian coach. They used all kind of tactics to make Milutinović's job difficult. But Milutinović qualified Honduras to the next round nonetheless. However, he did not resist the subsequent personal attacks, and literally left the country through the "back door." No one in Honduras noticed, until he was already, in his residence in Mexico.

When Milutinović was contacted in his residence by Rafael Leonardo Callejas; he recommended Raúl Martínez Sambulá and Juan Carlos Espinoza, to take over the Honduras national football team. With these two coaches in command, Honduras started the elimination round relatively well. They beat Costa Rica at home by score of 5–2. But the results after that first win were negative for the new coaches.

=== Comeback ===
After the defeat suffered by Honduras at the hands of Guatemala (0-1): The sport press, the federation, and football fans panicked, they saw another failure on the horizon. Chelato Ucles returned. Rafael Leonardo Callejas offered him the coaching position once more, and Chelato accepted.

He was asked if the situation could be restored with the national team facing elimination against Costa Rica. To what Chelato responded "In 33 days much can be done." And that "Is not impossible to win against to Costa Rica." He also added that if he qualified Honduras to the next round, he would be elected president.

After having accepted the coaching position, Chelato prepared the team in Miami. He made a series of line up changes, and played a preparation game against Haiti, then headed for San Pedro Sula to face the ‘Ticos.’—In the end; things did not go well for Chelato Ucles and his team. They were eliminated by Costa Rica in the final match. The press blamed Chelato, for dismantling the team with only 33 days left for a crucial match. Chelato on the other hand, blamed the federation and Bora Milutinovic, and the federation blamed the press.

After the elimination of Honduras from Germany 2006; Chelato stayed in control of the Honduras. The country did not want to know nothing about football, after so much frustration the people retired from the stadiums. Chelato noticed that and quietly prepared the team for next tournament; (Copa UNCAF 2005).

For this competition Ucles called a mixture of young and experienced players like: Wilmer Velásquez, and Milton Núñez, as well as; Carlos Moran and Marvin Chávez among others. In this tournament Chelato did a lot better than in the previous one; taking Honduras to the championship game against Costa Rica. He lost the final through penalty kicks, but qualified to the Gold Cup 2005 nonetheless.

In the 2005 Gold Cup played in the United States, Honduras beat teams like: Colombia, Panama, and Costa Rica, arriving at semifinal instances. Nevertheless, the Catrachos were defeated by the United States by score of 2–1, finishing in third place of the tournament. This was the last competition for Chelato Uclès. Then he retired and dedicated himself to politics.

In 2007, he was signed by Marathón again.

In 2010, Chelato Uclés was appointed national team manager of Belize in a bid to qualify for Brazil 2014.

In May 2012, he was made technical director of Real España for a second time, only to resign at the end of September 2012 citing internal problems and bad results.

== Health ==
In August 2015 Chelato Uclés, who was suffering from diabetes, was hospitalized to undergo a foot operation. He was granted a monthly 2200 dollar pension by Honduran Congress to challenge his disease and financial problems. He had been a member of Congress from 2006 to 2010. He died on 28 April 2021, at the age of 80.

== Death ==
"Chelato Uclés" died on 28 April 2021, fighting diabetes. Death was confirmed by his son.
