= San Matías, Honduras =

San Matías
- Municipality
- Location in Honduras
- Coordinates: 13°59′N 86°38′W
- Country: Honduras
- Department: El Paraíso

Area
  - Total: 116 km^{2} (45 sq mi)

Population (2015)
  - Total: 5,178
  - Density: 44.6/km^{2} (116/sq mi)

San Matías is a municipality in the Honduran department of El Paraíso.
