= San Lucas, Honduras =

San Lucas
- Municipality
- Location in Honduras
- Coordinates: 13°44′N 86°57′W
- Country: Honduras
- Department: El Paraíso

Area
  - Total: 123 km^{2} (47 sq mi)

Population (2015)
  - Total: 7,872
  - Density: 64.0/km^{2} (166/sq mi)

San Lucas is a municipality in the Honduran department of El Paraíso.
