= Vado Ancho =

- Municipality
- Location in Honduras
- Coordinates: 13°43′N 86°58′W
- Country: Honduras
- Department: El Paraíso

Area
  - Total: 85 km^{2} (33 sq mi)

Population (2015)
  - Total: 4,028
  - Density: 47/km^{2} (120/sq mi)

Vado Ancho (Spanish pronunciation: [ˈbaðo ˈantʃo]) is a municipality in the Honduran department of El Paraíso.
