= El Paraíso Department =

Department in Honduras

El Paraíso Department Departamento de El Paraíso
- Department
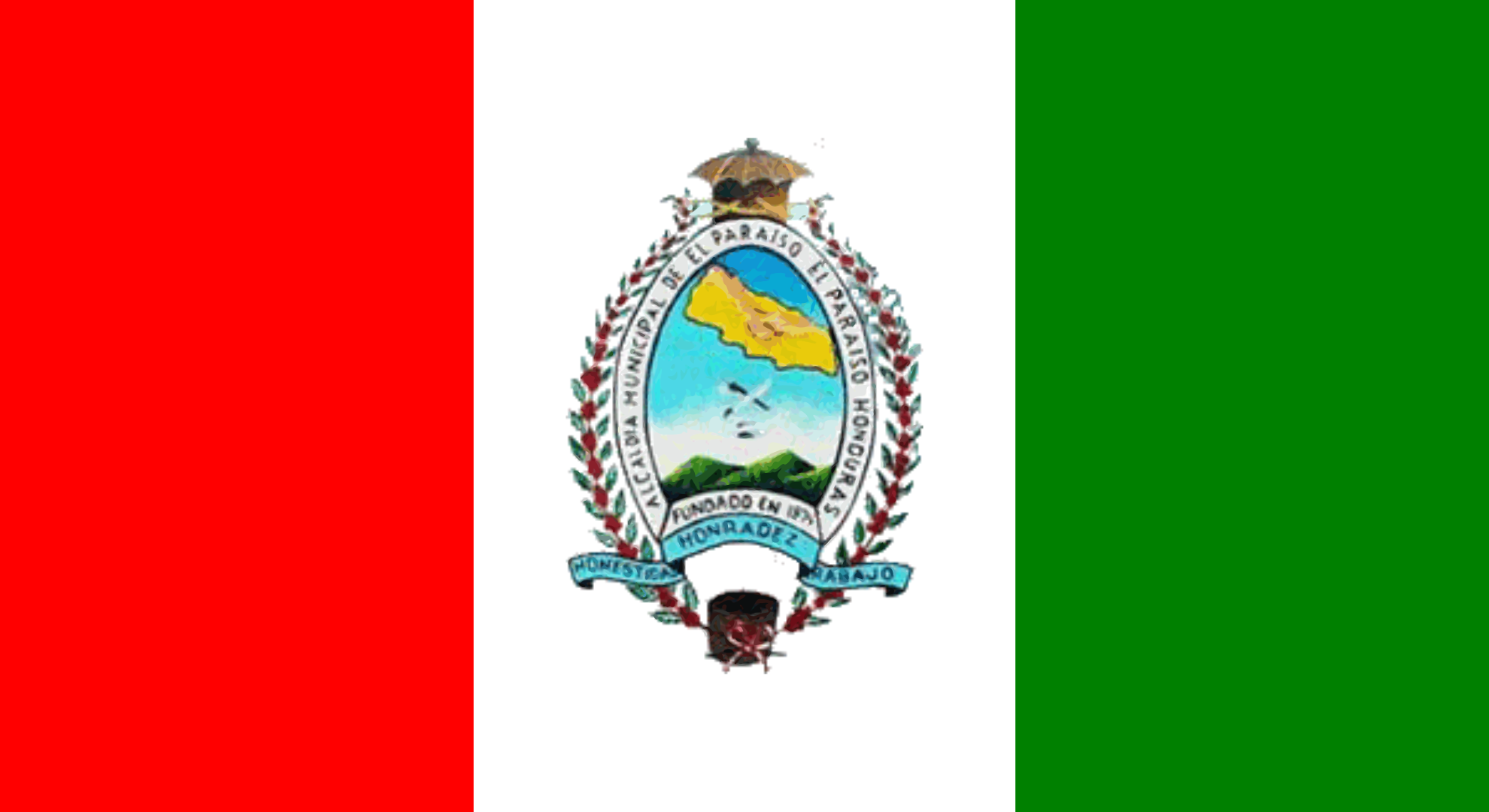
- Flag

- Location of El Paraíso in Honduras
- Coordinates: 13°56′N 86°51′W
- Country: Honduras
- Capital: Yuscarán
- Largest city: Danlí
- Municipalities: 19
- Villages: 233
- Founded: 28 May 1869

Government
  - Type: Departmental
  - Governor: Olga Flores (2022-2026) (LibRe)

Area
  - Total: 7,383 km^{2} (2,851 sq mi)

Population (2021)
  - Total: 502,944
  - Density: 68.12/km^{2} (176.4/sq mi)

GDP (Nominal, 2015 US dollar)
  - Total: $1.1 billion (2023)
  - Per capita: $2,000 (2023)

GDP (PPP, 2015 int. dollar)
  - Total: $2.3 billion (2023)
  - Per capita: $4,100 (2023)
- Time zone: UTC-6 (CDT)
- Postal code: 13101, 13201
- ISO 3166 code: HN-EP
- HDI (2021): 0.586 medium · 12th of 18
- Statistics derived from Consult INE online database: Population and Housing Census 2013

El Paraíso (Spanish pronunciation: [el paɾaˈiso]) is one of the 18 departments (departamentos) into which Honduras is divided.

The territory of El Paraíso was initially part of the departments of Tegucigalpa (renamed Francisco Morazán in 1943) and Olancho after Central America gained its independence in 1825. The department of El Paraíso was created with municipalities taken from the departments of Tegucigalpa and Olancho on 28 May 1869 by congressional decree in the third political division of Honduras, during the presidential term of José María Medina. Initially El Paraíso included the jurisdictions of Danlí, Yuscarán and Texiguat, along with the town of Guinope. On 28 December 1878, Texiguat was moved to the department of Tegucigalpa, but subsequently moved back into El Paraíso on 28 October 1886.

The departmental capital is Yuscarán. El Paraíso is bordered to the north by the department of Olancho, to the south by the department of de Choluteca, to the east by the Republic of Nicaragua, and to the west by the department of Francisco Morazán.

El Paraíso department covers a total surface area of 7489 km^{2} and, in 2015, had an estimated population of 458,742.

== Municipalities ==
1. Alauca
2. Danlí
3. El Paraíso
4. Güinope
5. Jacaleapa
6. Liure
7. Morocelí
8. Oropolí
9. Potrerillos
10. San Antonio de Flores
11. San Lucas
12. San Matías
13. Soledad
14. Teupasenti
15. Texiguat
16. Trojes
17. Vado Ancho
18. Yauyupe
19. Yuscarán
