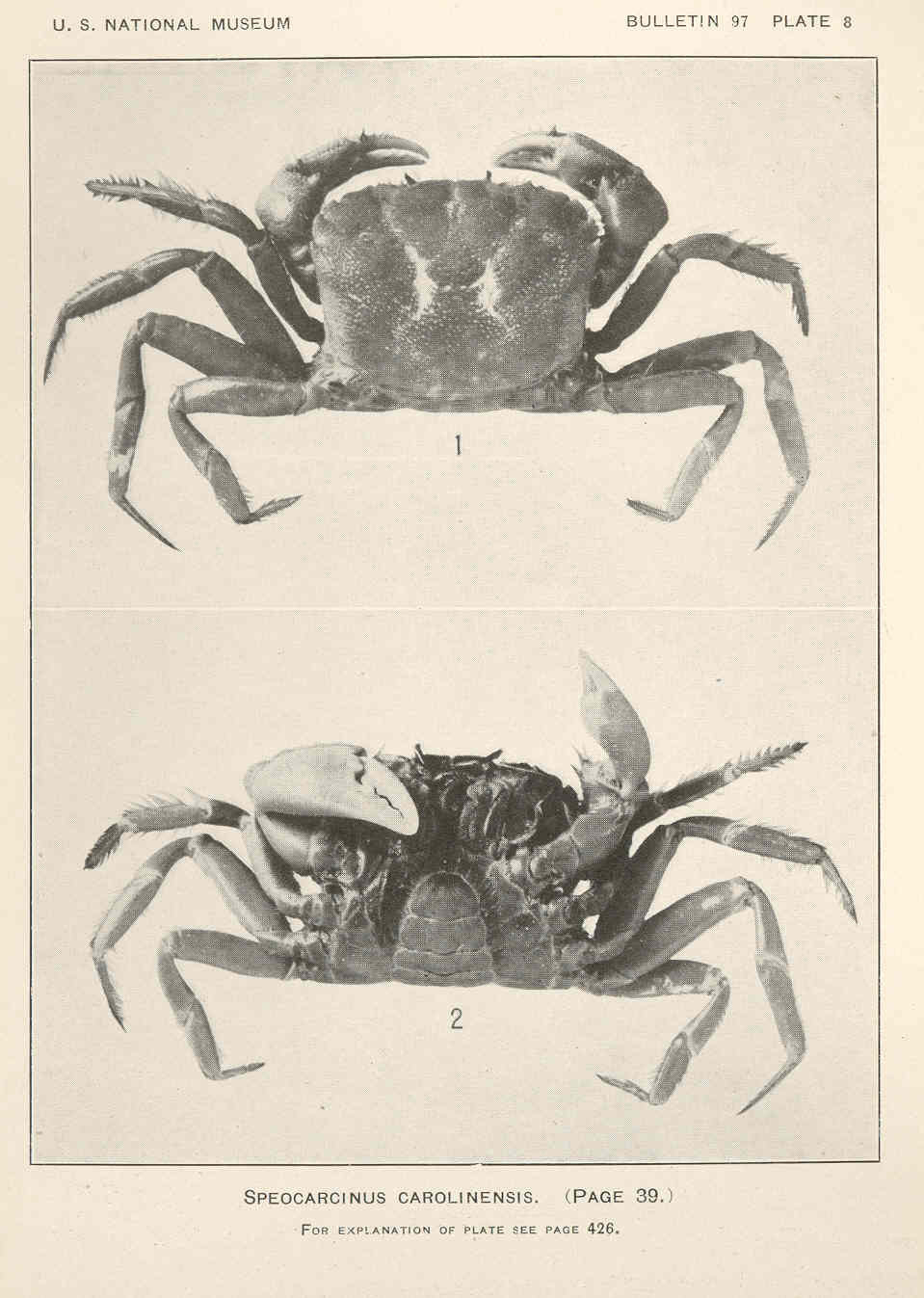
- Speocarcinus caroliensis

Scientific classification
- Domain: Eukaryota
- Kingdom: Animalia
- Phylum: Arthropoda
- Class: Malacostraca
- Order: Decapoda
- Suborder: Pleocyemata
- Infraorder: Brachyura
- Family: Pseudorhombilidae
- Genus: Speocarcinus; Stimpson, 1859

= Speocarcinus =

Speocarcinus Temporal range: Ypresian–Recent

Genus of crabs

Speocarcinus is a genus of crabs in the family Pseudorhombilidae, containing six extant species, one fossil species from the Late Miocene, one fossil species from the Eocene (Lutetian) and one fossil species from the Early Eocene (Ypresian):

- Speocarcinus carolinensis Stimpson, 1859
- Speocarcinus granulimanus Rathbun, 1894
- Speocarcinus lobatus Guinot, 1969
- Speocarcinus meloi D'Incao & Gomes da Silva, 1992
- Speocarcinus monotuberculatus Falder & Rabalais, 1986
- Speocarcinus spinicarpus Guinot, 1969
- †Speocarcinus berglundi Tucker et al., 1994
- †Speocarcinus tuberculatus (Beschin, De Angeli, Checchi & Zarantonello, 2005); originally described as a species of Paraxanthosia, transferred to the genus Speocarcinus by Beschin et al. (2012)
- †Speocarcinus latus Beschin et al., 2016
