= Secretariat of Public Works, Transport and Housing (Honduras) =

Office of State overview
- Formed: 1957
- Jurisdiction: National
- Headquarters: San José building, Tegucigalpa, M.D.C.
- Office of State executive: Roberto Ordoñez, Engineer

The Secretariat of Public Works, Transport and Housing (Spanish: Secretaría de Obras Públicas, Transporte y Vivienda de Honduras, SOPTRAVI) is responsible for formulation, coordination, execution and evaluation of policies related to housing, works of public infrastructure, urban systems, transportation, and the management of public works. It is part of the Home Office in the executive branch of the government of Honduras.

== History ==
It is responsible for sustainable development of transport infrastructure such as docks, railways, roads, airports and roads.

Originally designated the Secretary of Communications, Public Works and Transport (SEC-OPT) and later, the government of Rafael Leonardo Alleys added an entity for the development of communal projects designated Honduran Bottom of Social Investment (HBSI). In the government of Juan Orlando Hernández the office was renamed as Infrastructure and Public Services of Honduras INSEPH.

== Presupposed ==
The annual budget is some 1600 million lempiras per year (80 million dollars).

Prespuesto	Period	President
2004	1,652,000,000 (More than 268 one thousand)	Ricardo Mature
2007	1,520,162.300	Manuel Zelaya

The government of Honduras makes multiple investments in infrastructure from multiple ministries:

- Cabinet of Productive Infrastructure: 35,411 million Lempiras (22.85% of the budget) annually
- Infrastructure and Public Services: 3,074 million
- Productive infrastructure: 39,644 million
- Development and Social Infrastructure: 70,368.2 million
- Office of Public Works, Transport and House of Honduras (SOPTRAVI): 3 million
- Bottom vial; 1,000 million

== See also ==
- Highways in Honduras
- Demographics of Honduras
- Departments of Honduras
- Politics of Honduras
- Transport in Honduras

== Sources ==
- "Portal del Gobierno de Honduras". 2013-01-17. Archived from the original on December 30, 2005.
- "Soptravi". 2014-02-25. Archived from the original on May 25, 2004.
