= Teupasenti =

- Municipality
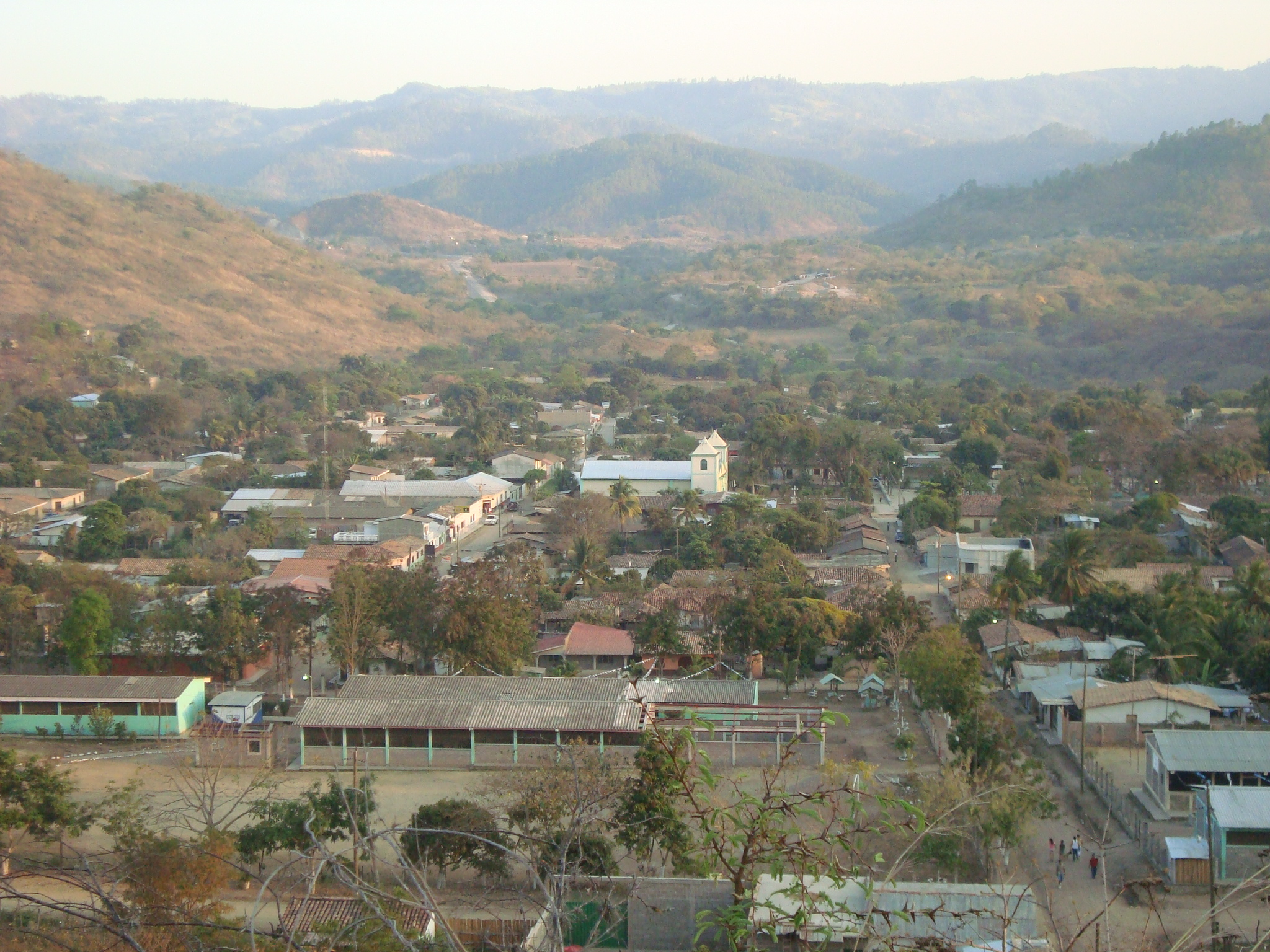

- Location in Honduras
- Coordinates: 14°13′N 86°42′W
- Country: Honduras
- Department: El Paraíso

Area
  - Total: 681 km^{2} (263 sq mi)

Population (2015)
  - Total: 43,477
  - Density: 63.8/km^{2} (165/sq mi)

Teupasenti (Spanish pronunciation: [tewpaˈsenti]) is a municipality in the Honduran department of El Paraiso.
