= Yauyupe =

- Municipality
- Location in Honduras
- Coordinates: 13°45′N 87°04′W
- Country: Honduras
- Department: El Paraíso

Area
  - Total: 76 km^{2} (29 sq mi)

Population (2015)
  - Total: 1,363
  - Density: 18/km^{2} (46/sq mi)

Yauyupe is a municipality in the Honduran department of El Paraíso.
