= Potrerillos, El Paraíso =

Potrerillos
- Municipality
- Location in Honduras
- Coordinates: 14°0′N 86°49′W
- Country: Honduras
- Department: El Paraíso

Area
  - Total: 125 km^{2} (48 sq mi)

Population (2015)
  - Total: 4,444
  - Density: 35.6/km^{2} (92.1/sq mi)

Potrerillos is a municipality in the Honduran department of El Paraíso.
