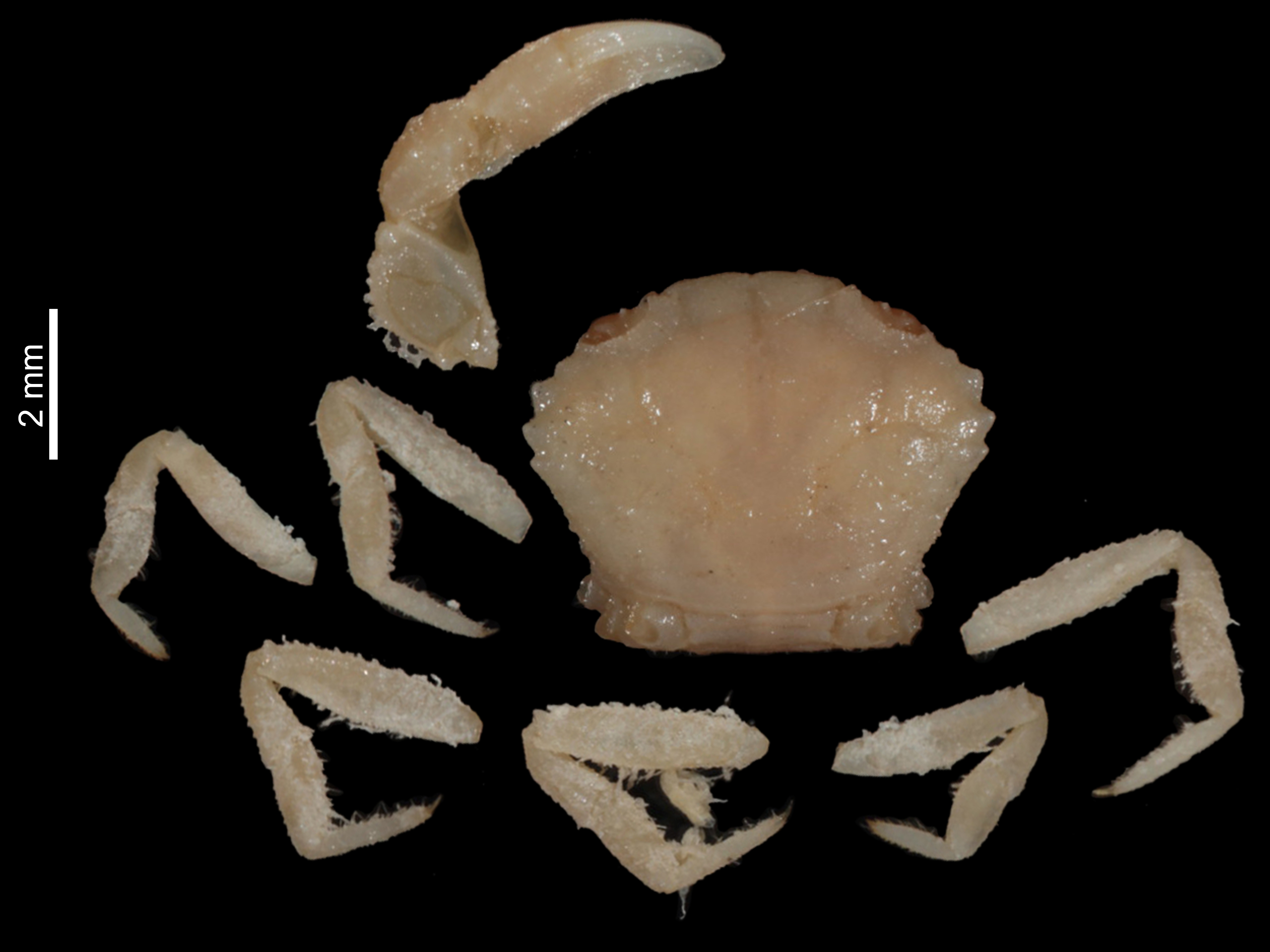
- Micropanope maculatus

Scientific classification
- Kingdom: Animalia
- Phylum: Arthropoda
- Clade: Pancrustacea
- Class: Malacostraca
- Order: Decapoda
- Suborder: Pleocyemata
- Infraorder: Brachyura
- Family: Pseudorhombilidae
- Genus: Micropanope; Stimpson, 1871

= Micropanope =

Genus of crabs

Micropanope is a genus of crabs in the family Pseudorhombilidae, containing the following species:

- Micropanope cristimanus Stimpson, 1871
- Micropanope lata (Faxon, 1893)
- Micropanope latimana Stimpson, 1871
- Micropanope lobifrons A. Milne-Edwards, 1881
- Micropanope maculatus (Rathbun, 1898)
- Micropanope pulcherrima Portell & Collins, 2004 †
- Micropanope sculptipes Stimpson, 1871
- Micropanope sexlobata Rathbun, 1906
- Micropanope truncatifrons Rathbun, 1898
