= Eucratodes =

Scientific classification
- Domain: Eukaryota
- Kingdom: Animalia
- Phylum: Arthropoda
- Class: Malacostraca
- Order: Decapoda
- Suborder: Pleocyemata
- Infraorder: Brachyura
- Family: Pseudorhombilidae
- Genus: Eucratodes; A. Milne Edwards, 1880
- Species: E. agassizii

Binomial name
- Eucratodes agassizii A. Milne Edwards, 1880

Genus of crabs

Eucratodes agassizii is a species of crabs in the family Pseudorhombilidae, the only species in the genus Eucratodes.
