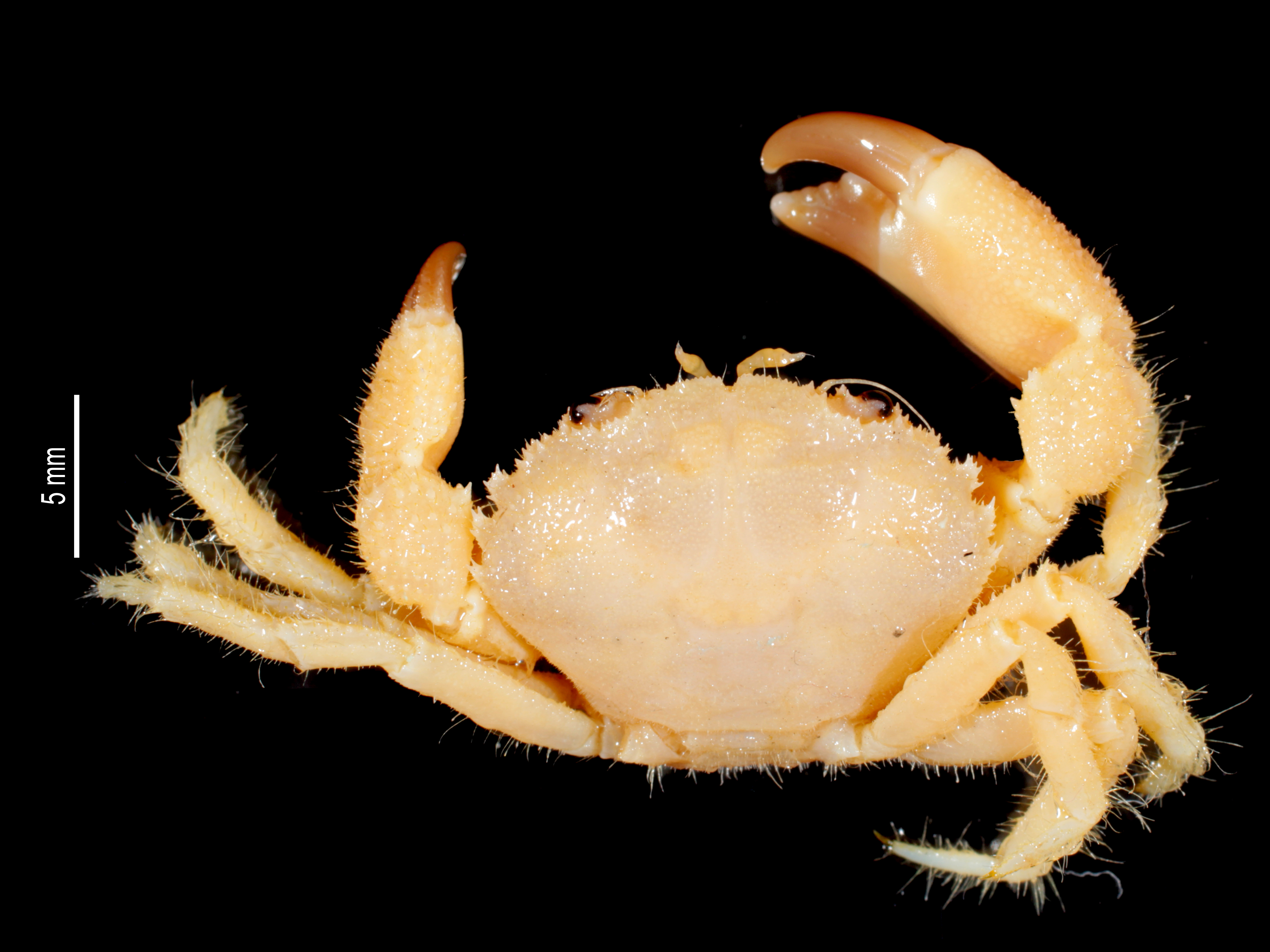
- Garthiope anchialina

Scientific classification
- Domain: Eukaryota
- Kingdom: Animalia
- Phylum: Arthropoda
- Class: Malacostraca
- Order: Decapoda
- Suborder: Pleocyemata
- Infraorder: Brachyura
- Family: Pseudorhombilidae
- Genus: Garthiope; Guinot, 1990

= Garthiope =

Genus of crabs

Garthiope is a genus of crabs in the family Pseudorhombilidae, containing the following species:

- Garthiope anchialina Guinot & Iliffe, 1991
- Garthiope barbadensis (Rathbun, 1921)
- Garthiope fraseri (Garth, 1946)
- Garthiope spinipes (A. Milne Edwards, 1880)
