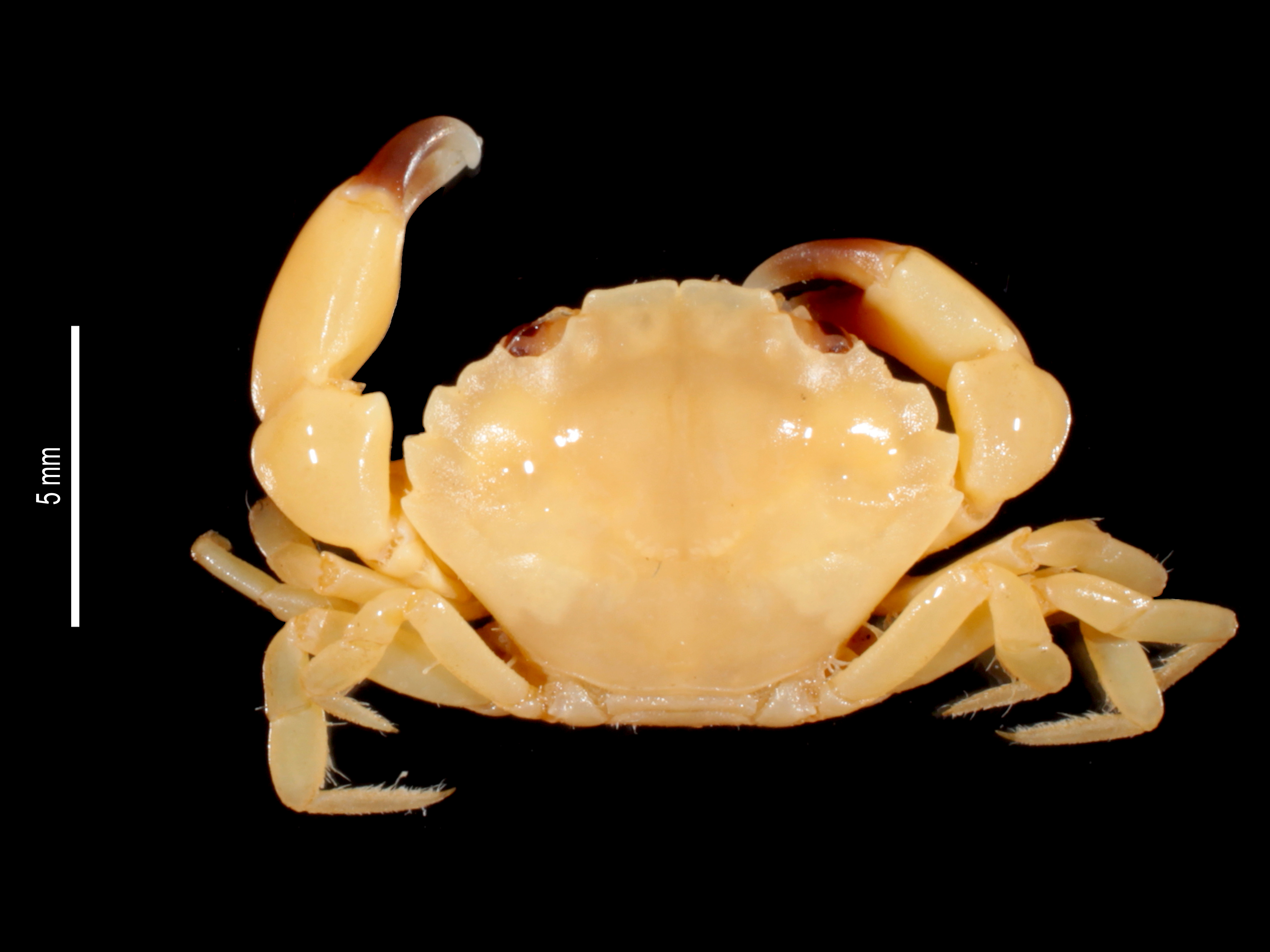
- Gonopanope angusta

Scientific classification
- Domain: Eukaryota
- Kingdom: Animalia
- Phylum: Arthropoda
- Class: Malacostraca
- Order: Decapoda
- Suborder: Pleocyemata
- Infraorder: Brachyura
- Family: Pseudorhombilidae
- Genus: Gonopanope; Guinot, 1967

= Gonopanope =

Genus of crabs

Gonopanope is a genus of crabs in the family Pseudorhombilidae, containing the following species:

- Gonopanope angusta (Lockington, 1877)
- Gonopanope areolata (Rathbun, 1898)
- Gonopanope nitida (Rathbun, 1898)
