= Misael Argeñal =

Honduran writer (born 1954)

- Born: 21 January 1954 (age 71); Jacaleapa, Honduras
- Occupations: Televangelist, pastor, educator
- Spouse: María Elena de Argeñal
- Children: David Argeñal; Alejandra Argeñal; Karen Argeñal

Misael Argeñal (Jacaleapa, El Paraíso, January 21, 1954) is the president of Universidad Cristiana de Honduras, which was founded by Ministerio La Cosecha (International Church of the Foursquare Gospel). He is a well-known and influential pastor in Honduras.

He founded Ministerio Internacional La Cosecha in 1977.

In 2014, Argeñal left the country after receiving death threats. The Public Relations Department of the Harvest Ministry issued a statement saying that the pastor had departed in order to fast and pray in preparation for "the large evangelistic crusade" that he organizes every year in different football stadiums in San Pedro Sula.

On 2 January 2016, he underwent emergency surgery at a private clinic in San Pedro after being affected by an unusual fungal infection in his nostrils. However, in February of the same year, Argeñal stated that he had been cured by a miracle, as expressed by his wife, Pastor María Elena.
