= Trojes =

- Municipality
- Location in Honduras
- Coordinates: 14°4′N 85°58′W
- Country: Honduras
- Department: El Paraíso

Area
  - Total: 1,383 km^{2} (534 sq mi)

Population (2023 projection)
  - Total: 56,880
  - Density: 41.13/km^{2} (106.5/sq mi)

Trojes is a town, with a population of 9,960 (2023 calculation), and a municipality in the Honduran department of El Paraíso.
