= Potrerillos, Cortés =

Potrerillos
- Municipality
- Location within Honduras
- Coordinates: 15°13′N 87°57′W
- Country: Honduras
- Department: Cortés

Area
  - Total: 99.4 km^{2} (38.4 sq mi)
- Elevation: 51 m (167 ft)

Population (2023 projection)
  - Total: 26,954
  - Density: 271/km^{2} (702/sq mi)

Potrerillos is a town, with a population of 20,050 (2023 calculation), and a municipality in the Honduran department of Cortés. The municipality was founded in 1875.
