= Oropolí =

- Municipality
- Location in Honduras
- Coordinates: 13°49′N 86°49′W
- Country: Honduras
- Department: El Paraíso

Area
  - Total: 159 km^{2} (61 sq mi)

Population (2015)
  - Total: 6,013
  - Density: 37.8/km^{2} (97.9/sq mi)

Oropolí is a municipality in the Honduran department of El Paraíso.
