= California State Route 5 =

Two highways, none of which were designated as only a state route, in the U.S. state of California have been signed as Route 5:

- Interstate 5 in California, part of the Interstate Highway System but simply referred to as "Route 5" in state law
- California State Route 5 (1934), now part of Route 35
