= Jacaleapa =

- Municipality
- Location in Honduras
- Coordinates: 14°1′N 86°40′W
- Country: Honduras
- Department: El Paraíso

Area
  - Total: 123 km^{2} (47 sq mi)

Population (2015)
  - Total: 4,068
  - Density: 33.1/km^{2} (85.7/sq mi)

Jacaleapa is a municipality in the El Paraíso of Yuscarán, Honduras.

== Notable people ==
- Misael Argeñal (born 1954), writer
