= Pimienta, Honduras =

Pimienta
- Municipality
- Nickname: El Manguito
- Location within Honduras
- Coordinates: 15°17′N 87°58′W
- Country: Honduras
- Department: Cortés

Area
  - Municipality: 55.4 km^{2} (21.4 sq mi)
- Elevation: 83 m (272 ft)

Population (2023 projection)
  - Municipality: 23,701
  - Density: 428/km^{2} (1,110/sq mi)
  - Urban: 16,921
- Climate: Aw

Pimienta is a town, with a population of 13,530 (2023 calculation), and a municipality in the Honduran department of Cortés. The name means "pepper" in Spanish.

== History ==
The municipality of Pimienta was created on January 10, 1927. It was named for its abundance of pepper trees.

In 1879 Pimienta was a small collection of buildings, and by the census of 1887 it was a small village in the municipality of Villanueva. In the 1895 national census, Pimienta belonged to the municipality of Potrerillos. In 1924, with the opening of a railway bridge connecting Potrerillos, Pimienta became a place of great commercial growth, thus inducing banana producing companies to set up a pay office there.

On June 7, 1934 an enormous swelling of the river Ulúa destroyed a large part of the town of Pimienta, therefore in 1936 the population was moved to a new site which became known as Nueva Pimienta (New Pimienta), the new head town of the municipality.

== Geography ==
Pimienta is bounded by the municipalities of San Manuel to the north, Villanueva to the north and west, Potrerillos to the south, and El Progreso, Yoro Department, to the east. The Ulúa River passes through Pimienta municipality. Its climate is predominantly hot, with the warmest months being March and June.
