= Texiguat =

- Municipality
- Location in Honduras
- Coordinates: 13°39′N 87°1′W
- Country: Honduras
- Department: El Paraíso

Area
  - Total: 203 km^{2} (78 sq mi)

Population (2015)
  - Total: 8,791
  - Density: 43.3/km^{2} (112/sq mi)

Texiguat (Spanish pronunciation: [teksiˈɣwat]) is a municipality in the Honduran department of El Paraíso.
