= CA-5 (Honduras highway) =

Highway in Honduras

Central American Highway 5

Location
- Country: Honduras

Highway system
- Roads in Honduras

CA-5 is a national highway in Honduras. It connects Tegucigalpa and San Pedro Sula, crossing the cities of Comayagua, Siguatepeque, El Lago de Yojoa, Potrerillos, Pimienta, Búfalo and Villa Nueva. In San Pedro Sula, it joins the CA-13 highway that connects with Puerto Cortés. The CA-5 also has a branch that communicates with the cities of La Paz, Marcala, La Esperanza and Santa Rita.

In 2013 the Millennium Interchange (Intercambio Milenio) was inaugurated, which allows a better connection between the CA-5 with Tegucigalpa. It was financed as part of the Honduras Millennium Account with an investment of 14 million dollars.
