= Güinope =

- Municipality
- Location within Honduras
- Coordinates: 13°53′0″N 86°56′0″W
- Country: Honduras
- Department: El Paraíso
- Founded: 1747

Area
  - Total: 201 km^{2} (78 sq mi)

Population (2015)
  - Total: 8,794
  - Density: 43.8/km^{2} (113/sq mi)

Güinope is a municipality in the Honduran department of El Paraíso.

According to a 2001 census, it had 6.941 inhabitants. Founded by Esteban Rodríguez in 1747, it celebrates the "Festival of Oranges" every year since 1981. Also, in May they celebrate in honour of San Isidro Labrador.

The name Güinope originates in Mexico and means In the water of pigeons.

In 2021 Güinope's "RUTA NARANJA" was awarded as one of the Honduras 30 Wonders.

== Villages ==
The municipality is made up by ten villages:

- Güinope (main village)
- Arrayanes
- Casitas
- Galeras
- Las Liquidámbas
- Lavanderos
- Mansaragua
- Pacayas
- Santa Rosa
- Silisgualagua
