= National historical monuments of Honduras =

The Republic of Honduras has many historical monuments relating to its pre-Columbian native past, as well as its Spanish colonial era and republican period. The law for the Protection of the Cultural Heritage of Honduras considers examples of historical monuments, fine furniture, and expressions of folk art (folclórica) worthy of preservation.

== Background ==
The Historical Monument and National Heritage act was passed by the National Congress of Honduras. It is administered by the Honduran Institute of Anthropology and History (IHAH) with legal status and its own assets. Under Honduran law, all archaeological and historical sites and objects are the property of the people of Honduras, with the Instituto Hondureño de Antropología e Historia the guardian of this commonwealth. IHAH is charged with conducting and regulating research, with managing both the movable property and sites, and with disseminating knowledge of this patrimony to the people.

A special office, the Fiscalia de Etnias, currently occupied by Jany del Cid (2012), prosecutes violations of the law concerning national patrimony. Controversially, the state government of Honduras does not actually pay the bill for most of this important work. It pays less than a third of the budget. The rest comes mainly from admission fees.

== List of historical monuments ==
Date of statement	Monument	Type	Others
11 May 1959	Fortaleza de San Fernando of Omoa	Historical building	16th century
19 October 1972	Comayagua	Urban historical centre	15th century
21 April 1977	Headquarters of the National Post of Honduras	Historical building	19th century
9 November 1979	Choluteca	Urban historical centre	16th century
26 November 1981	Copán	Mayan archaeologic group	1st century to. C. Also World Heritage Site
28 June 1989	El Puente, El Jigua, Copán	Mayan archaeologic zone	1st century d. N. And.
7 September 1990	Omoa, Cortés.	Historical group-tourist	16th century
25 July 1991	San Antonio de Oriente, Francisco Morazán Department.	Historical monument	17th century
23 March 1993	Church of Our Lady of Suyapa	National monument	18th century
24 April 1993	Santa Rosa de Copán	Historical monument	17th century (capitalist city in the 18th century)
4 June 1993	Cedros, Francisco Morazán	Urban historical centre	17th century (The first Constitution of Honduras was drafted here)
15 July 1993	Yuscarán, El Paraíso	Urban historical centre	17th century
11 August 1993	Headquarters of the House of the Culture. City of The Peace	Historical building	17th century
16 April 1994	Trujillo, Colón.	Historical centre, city, bay, Fortress of Santa Bárbara	15th century
6 June 1994	Palace Bográn, Santa Bárbara	Historical building, was property of the family Bográn.	18th century
27 December 1994	Cerro Juana Laínez, Tegucigalpa, MDC	Tourist natural centre and of cultural recreation.	
7 December 1994	Juticalpa, Olancho	Historical centre	16th century
3 March 1995	City of Tegucigalpa and surroundings	Historical urban centre	16th century
15 November 1996	Ojojona, Francisco Morazán	Historical urban centre	17th century
21 January 1997	Valle de Ángeles, Francisco Morazán	Tourist city	17th century
1 November 1997	Archaeologic zone Cerro Palenque, Depto of Cortés.	Archaeologic zone Lenca.	
1 November 1997	The Naranjos, Lake of Yojoa	Archaeologic zone.	
1 November 1997	Tenampúa, Comayagua	Archaeologic zone Lenca.	
1 November 1997	Cuevas of Talgua, Olancho	Archaeologic place, pre-Columbian	8th century to. C.
Church of Langue, Valle	Historical building	18th century	
Church of Caridad, Valle	Historical building	18th century	
Church of Goascorán, Valle	Historical building	18th century	
City of Gracias, Lempira Dept	Historical urban centre	16th century (First headquarters of the Real Audience of Confine them)	
10 October 2010	The Hill Congolón, Depto of Lempira	Historical natural place	

=== Historical buildings of Tegucigalpa ===
Order	Monument	Type	Others
1	Palace of the Ministries	Historical building	19th century
2	Manuel Bonilla National Theatre	Historical building	20th century
3	Former headquarters of Empresa Nacional de Energía Eléctrica (ENEE)	Historical building	19th century
4	Municipal palace	Historical building	19th century
5	House of Doctor Ramón Rosa	Historical building, headquarters of the Museum of the Honduran Man	19th century
6	National Library of Honduras, former headquarters of the National Typography	Historical building, current headquarters of the National Library Juan Ramón Molina	19th century
7	National archive of Honduras	Historical building	19th century
8	National Gallery of Art (Ancient Paraninfo)	Historical building	19th century
9	National School of Fine Arts, Comayagüela, DC	Historical building	19th century
10A	Palacete Presidential	Historical building, current headquarters of the Presidential Museum, Anthropology and History.	19th century

=== Historical buildings of Juticalpa ===
Order	Monument	Type	Others
1	Church Cerrito	Historical building	18th century
2	House of the Culture	Historical building	19th century
3	Institute Fraternity	Historical building	19th century
