= Teresita Fortín =

Honduran painter (1885–1982)

Teresa Victoria Fortín Franco (November 17, 1885 – January 19, 1982) was a Honduran painter.

Born in Yuscarán, into a middle class family, Fortín was descended from a family of Creole miners of French origin. She evinced artistic talent from a young age, but was unable to pursue a career in the arts due to her gender. Instead she traveled to Tegucigalpa, where she studied at the School for Young Ladies run by Concha Maldonado. During the 1920s she worked as a teacher at the primary school in Valle de Ángeles. A serious illness in 1930 forced her retirement, and she took up drawing and oil painting as a hobby. She exhibited work at the National Library of Honduras in 1933, under the auspices of the Secretariat of Education, receiving as a result private lessons with Maximiliano Ramírez Euceda. When Alejandro del Vecchio was hired by Archbishop Agustín Hombach to restore the decorative scheme of Tegucigalpa Cathedral she was hired as his assistant, developing as a result an interest in religious painting. She also took an interest in the work of Pablo Zelaya Sierra. Fortín was hired by Carlos Zúñiga Figueroa to teach at his art academy at its foundation in 1932.

During her career she worked with the Carnegie Foundation, assisting in its excavation and restoration of the archaeological site at Copán in 1938. She continued to show work both in solo exhibitions and in group shows. In 1976 she presented a cycle of autobiographical paintings depicting various moments in her life. She received the Pablo Zelaya Sierra Prize for her work in 1980.

Fortín died in Tegucigalpa.
