= List of botanical gardens in Honduras =

Botanical gardens in Honduras have collections consisting entirely of Honduras native and endemic species; most have a collection that include plants from around the world. There are botanical gardens and arboreta in all states and territories of Honduras, most are administered by local governments, some are privately owned.

- Blue Harbour Tropical Arboretum, Roatán, Bay Islands Department 16°20′58″N 86°31′42″W
- Zamorano Botanical Garden, San Antonio de Oriente, Francisco Morazán Department 14.011152°N 87.013253°W
- Jardin Botanico Municipal Perez Estrada, San Pedro Sula, Cortés Department 15.5036°N 88.0046°W
- Escuela Agricola Panamericana, Universidad Nacional Autónoma de Honduras, Tegucigalpa 14.0839155°N 87.205376°W
- Lancetilla Botanic Garden & Research Center, Tela 15.7748°N 87.4568°W

== Honduras Plants records ==
Established in 1942 Biblioteca Wilson Popenoe, Francisco Morazán Department has extensive records on Honduras Plant Collections.
