= Marale =

- Municipality
- Location in Honduras
- Coordinates: 14°55′0″N 87°2′6″W
- Country: Honduras
- Department: Francisco Morazán
- Founded: 1820
- Municipality: 1889

Area
  - Total: 476 km^{2} (184 sq mi)

Population (2015)
  - Total: 9,170
  - Density: 19.3/km^{2} (49.9/sq mi)

Marale is a municipality in the department of Francisco Morazán, Honduras.

== Location ==
Marale is bordered on the north by the municipality of Yoro, south by the municipalities of El Porvenir and San Ignacio, to the east by the municipalities of Mangulile, Yocón and Orica, and west by the municipalities of Sulaco, Yorito and San José del Potrero. It is surrounded by several ranges of hills, known as El Portillo, La Loma de la Cruz and Mud Loma.

== History ==
Marale was founded in 1820, and in 1889 became one of the municipalities of the Cedros District.

== Villages ==
The municipality of Marale encompasses the following eleven villages:

- Marale (county seat)
- El Carrizal
- El Panal
- El Paraíso
- La Esperanza o El Cacao
- La Travesía
- Las Casitas
- Las Lagunas
- Los Naranjos
- Los Planes
- Río Abajo

== Economy ==
The main source of livelihood in the parish is agriculture, especially the production of corn and beans.

== Culture ==
The parish is mainly Roman Catholic. The new year is marked with the celebration of La Feria, in honour of Cristo negro (Black Christ).
