= José Antonio Velásquez =

Honduran painter

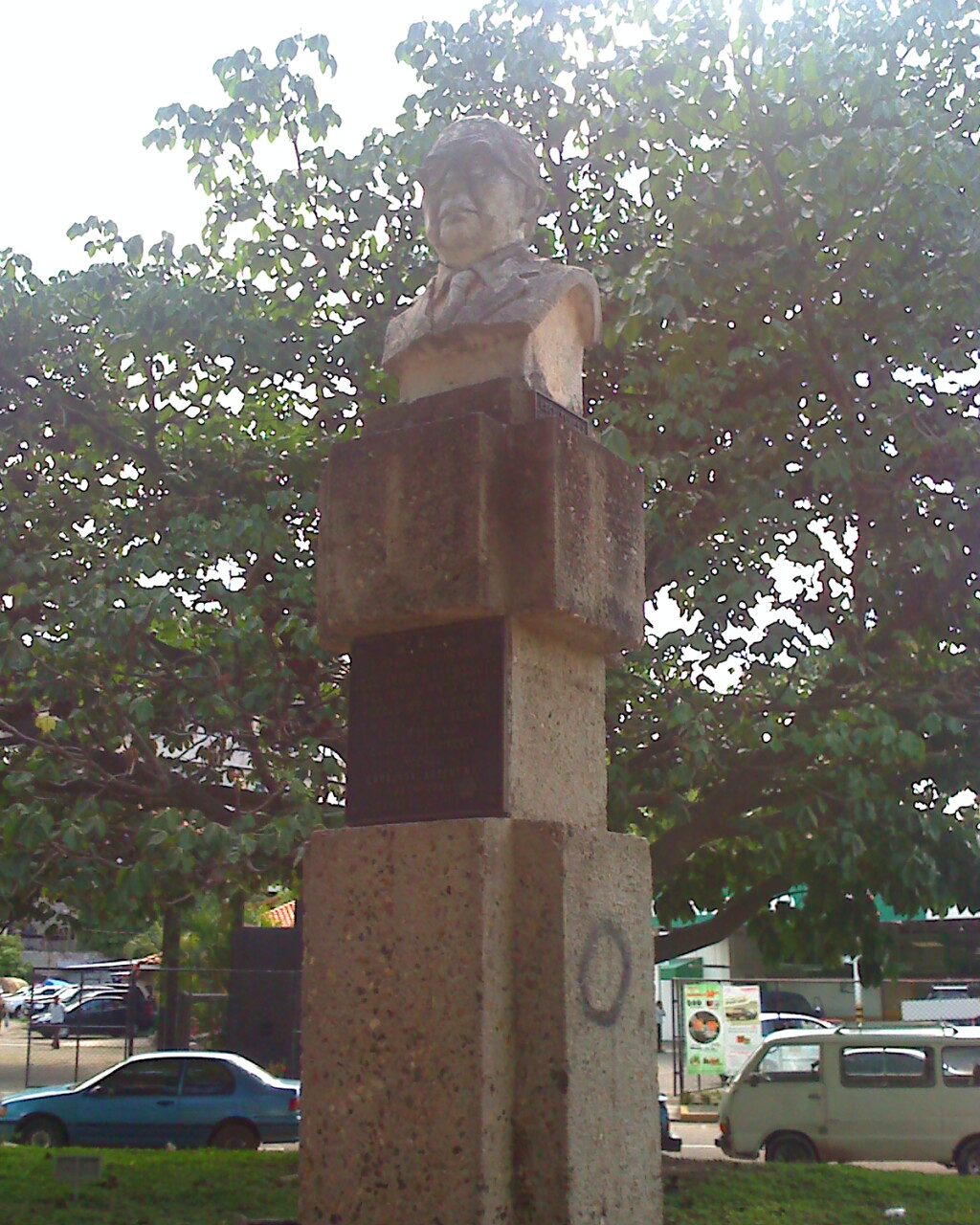
Bust of José Antonio Velásquez in Tegucigalpa.

José Antonio Velásquez (1906–1983) was a self-taught Honduran painter. His work can be seen at the Art Museum of the Americas in Washington, D.C. José Antonio Velásquez was known as a "Primitivist" painter who depicted Honduran landscapes and street scenes.

== Biography ==
Antonio Velásquez was born in Valle in Honduras on February 8, 1906. He moved to San Antonio de Oriente around 1930. That region and its vivid rural life provided the subject matter for many of the artist's paintings. He worked various trades, including as a barber and telegraph operator. Both the residents of San Antonio de Oriente and Hondurans at broad held great acclaim for José Antonio Velásquez. He died of a heart attack in 1983 in Tegucigalpa. Honduran intellectuals such as Filadelfo Suazo memorialized Antonio Velásquez in poems and newspaper articles after his death.

== Art and legacy ==
Although Antonio Velásquez was self-taught and relatively isolated in a rural municipality, his art was well known nationally and internationally by the 1950s. Due to his lack of professional training as an artist and non-academic subject matter, his art is often considered folk art and "Primitivist." He was included in the 1951 Latin American Art Biennial. His artwork has been displayed in the United States, Germany, Spain, and many Latin American countries. The Organization of American States sponsored a 1972 documentary about José Antonio Velásquez narrated by the actress Shirley Temple. Honduran writers such as Rafael Heleodoro Valle and Filadelfo Suazo lauded Antonio Velásquez as a national treasure.
