= San Miguelito =

San Miguelito could be any of the following geographical locations:

- San Miguelito, Honduras, a municipality
- San Miguel Guancapla, Honduras, a municipality also known as San Miguelito
- San Miguelito, Nayarit, in the state of Nayarit, Mexico
- San Miguelito, Querétaro, in the state of Querétaro, Mexico
- San Miguelito, Sonora, in the state of Sonora, Mexico
- San Miguelito, Nicaragua, a municipality
- San Miguelito District, Panama
  - San Miguelito metro station
- San Miguelito Oil Field, California, United States
