= Valle de Ángeles =

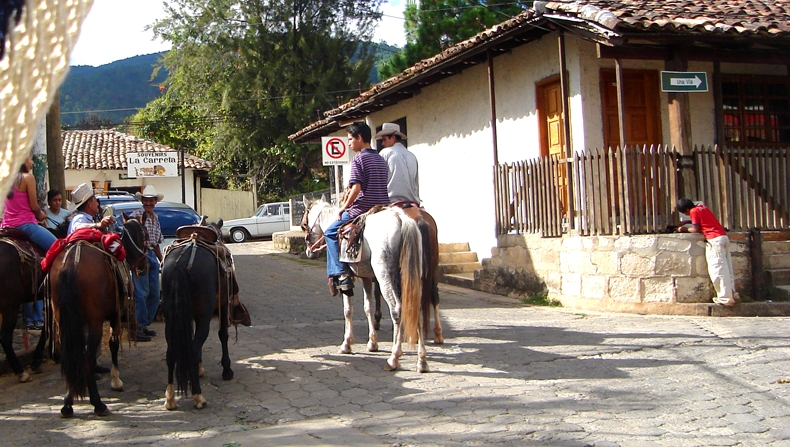

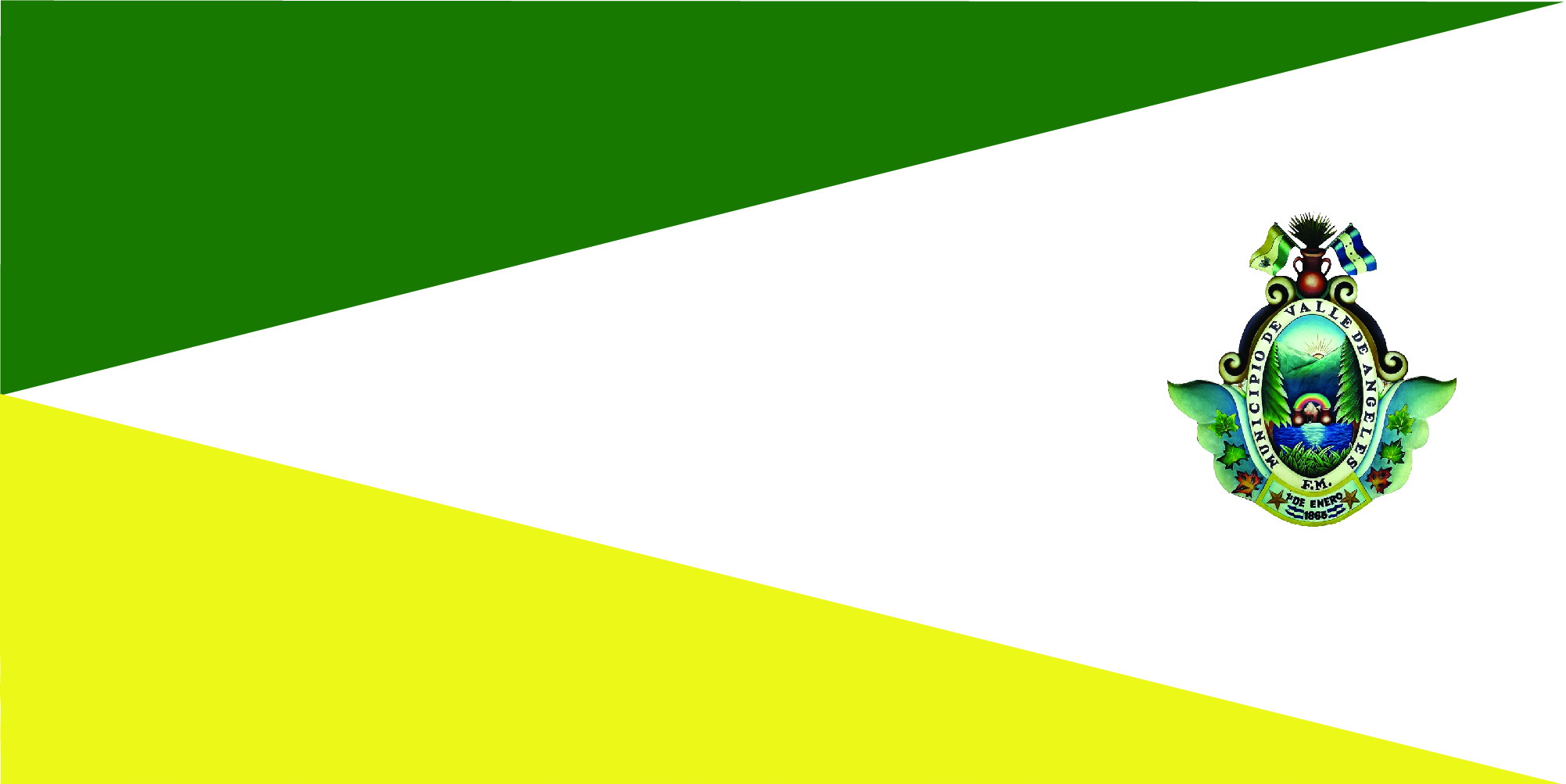
- Flag

- Location in Honduras
- Coordinates: 14°9′N 87°2′W
- Country: Honduras
- Department: Francisco Morazán
- Municipality: Valle de Ángeles
- Municipality since: 5 January 1865; 161 years ago

Government
  - Type: Democratic Municipality

Area
  - Total: 107 km^{2} (41 sq mi)

Population (2015)
  - Total: 17,652
  - Density: 165/km^{2} (427/sq mi)
- Climate: Aw

Valle de Ángeles is a municipality in the Honduran department of Francisco Morazán.

The local holiday is October 4, San Francisco Day.

== Location ==
The town is bordered on the north by the municipality of Central District, on the south by the municipality of San Antonio de Oriente, east by the municipalities of Morocelí and Villa de San Francisco and west by the municipality of Santa Lucía. It is located about 22 km northeast of the capital city, Tegucigalpa in the valley of the same name, between the mountains of Los Lagos, El Carrizal, Palo Hueco and Chinacla.

== Economy and tourism ==
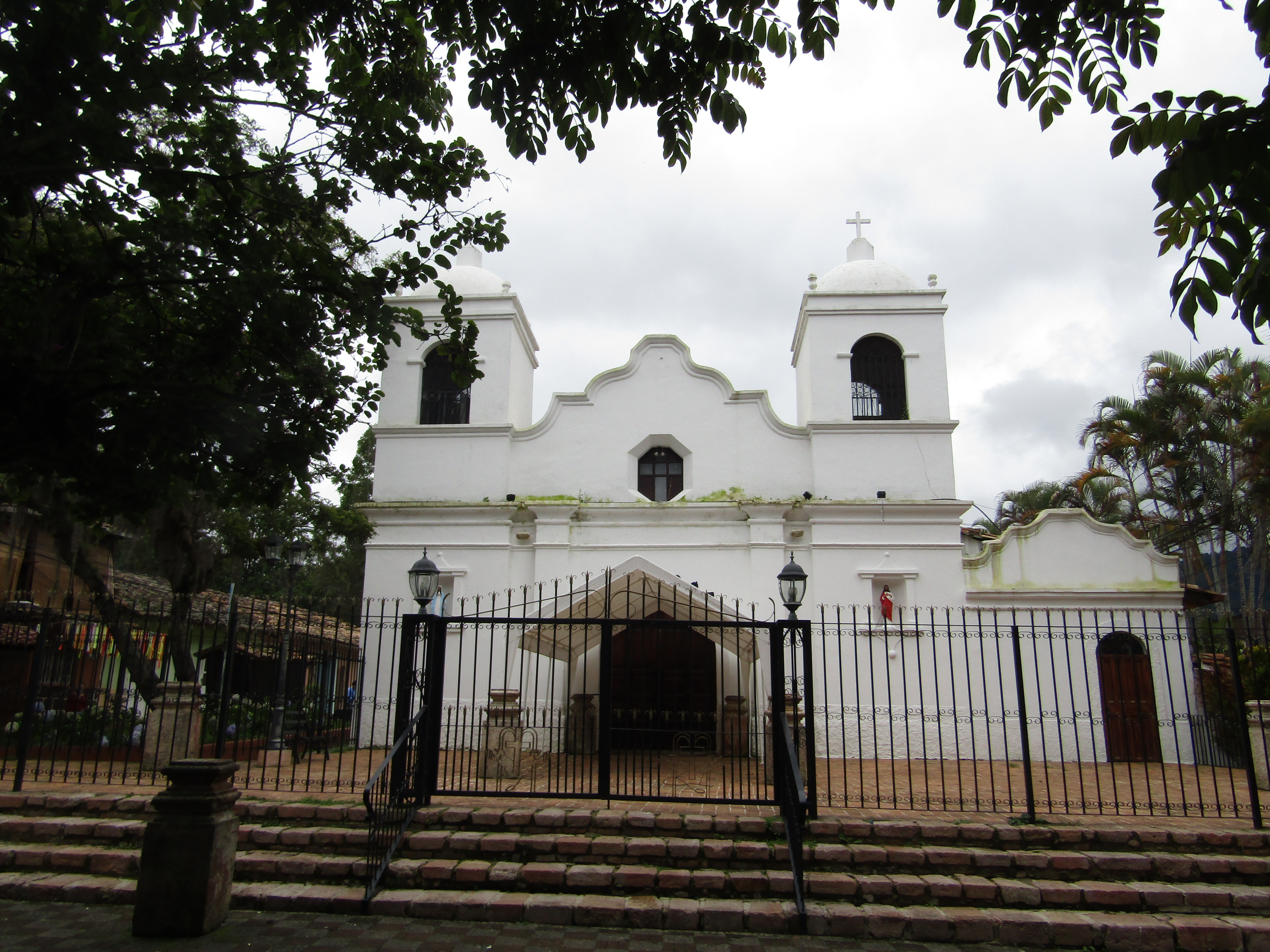
Colonial Church.

The town is a popular tourist attraction for the colonial architecture, ethnic crafts and scenery, plus nearby ecotourism. Crafts include wood carvings, pottery, and contemporary art.

The road is completely paved from Tegucigalpa. A few kilometers away there is an important forest reserve called Parque Nacional "La Tigra". La Tigra is a cloud forest rich in biodiversity and there are hiking trails. Much of the fresh water for Tegucigalpa is from this forest.

== Historical data ==
In the 1791 population count was part of the parish of Santa Lucia, under the name of the Cimarron or the pigsty On April 1, 1862, Fray Juan de Jesus Zepeda gave it its current name, and in 1865 it was designated as a Municipality (municipio).

The region was an important mining town in the history of Honduras, with enclaves such as Las Animas and El Socorro, which produced gold, silver, copper, tin, lead and zinc.
