= Cedros =

Cedros, Portuguese and Spanish for cedars, may refer to the following places:

== Honduras ==
- Cedros, Francisco Morazán, a municipality in the Department of Francisco Morazán

== Mexico ==
- Cedros Island, an island in the State of Baja California

== Portugal ==
- Cedros (Horta), a civil parish in the municipality of Horta, island of Faial, Azores
- Cedros (Santa Cruz das Flores), a civil parish in the municipality of Santa Cruz das Flores, island of Flores, Azores

== Trinidad and Tobago ==
- Cedros, Trinidad and Tobago, the southwestern peninsula of the island of Trinidad, as well as a town on that peninsula
