= Vallecillo =

Vallecillo, meaning little valley in Spanish, can refer to:

People:

- Érick Vallecillo (born 1980), Honduran footballer
- Orlin Vallecillo (born 1983), Honduran footballer

Places:

- Vallecillo, Honduras, town in Honduras
- Vallecillo Municipality, Nuevo León, town in Nuevo León, Mexico
- Vallecillo, León, town in the province of León, Castile y León, Spain
- El Vallecillo, town in the province of Teruel, Aragón, Spain
