= Las Terrazas, Honduras =

Archaeological site in Honduras

Las Terrazas
- La Toronja
- Location: Francisco Morazán

History
- Built: 700−500 b.C
- Built by: Possibly Lenca
- Abandoned: Post Classic

Las Terrazas is an archaeological site located in Honduras. It consists of the ruins of what was once a series of pre-Hispanic agricultural terraces built on the Cerro de Hula mountain. This site is considered the largest agricultural field in Mesoamerica due to its vast size.

== Location ==
The site is situated in the Francisco Morazán department, approximately 27 km south of Tegucigalpa, the country's capital, along the road to the towns of Santa Ana and Ojojona.

Climate

The site is located in an area characterized by a tropical dry forest climate, with heavy rainfall during the middle of the year and moderate precipitation towards the end of the season, accompanied by winds reaching speeds of up to 36 km/h. In the summer, temperatures can reach as high as 26 °C, while in winter, they typically drop to a maximum of 16 °C.

== History ==
While there is no definitive evidence regarding the exact time or people responsible for the construction of the terraces, it is widely accepted that the site was part of the Lenca cultural sphere, an indigenous group that historically inhabited the region of western Honduras and El Salvador. The Lenca people are known for their rich agricultural practices, and the terraces likely played a crucial role in their daily lives, serving as an expansive agricultural center that fed the surrounding communities.

Some experts suggest that the construction of the agricultural terraces began during the Preclassic period (around 1000 BCE), based on archaeological findings in other Mesoamerican sites that share similar characteristics. However, other researchers point to a more recent date, with the terraces possibly being constructed sometime between 700 and 500 BCE, during the Early Classic period. This uncertainty is largely due to the lack of written records from the time, as well as the fact that much of the archaeological evidence at the site remains unexplored.

The terraces were first mentioned in the 19th century by the American explorer William Wells, who described the ruins in his book Explorations and Adventures in Honduras (1857). Wells noted that the site featured flat, earth formations that were visible along the road, and although he did not fully recognize their significance, he speculated that they were related to ancient agricultural practices. This early account sparked interest in the site, but it wasn't until the 20th and 21st centuries that serious archaeological research was conducted.

In the modern era, the site began to receive some attention, particularly after the year 2013 when the government of Honduras, in collaboration with local and international archaeologists, launched a series of research projects to investigate the site's full extent. Through aerial surveys and advanced technologies, such as LIDAR (Light Detection and Ranging), researchers were able to uncover a vast network of agricultural terraces, which revealed the site's sophisticated engineering and strategic placement along the slopes of Cerro de Hula. These findings confirmed that the terraces were an essential component of the region's ancient agricultural system, one that could have supported large populations by providing a reliable food source through the cultivation of crops in a variety of micro-environments.

One of the most remarkable discoveries from these studies was the intricate irrigation system that was likely used to channel water from nearby rivers to the terraces. This system of water management would have been vital to sustaining crops in the region's tropical dry forest climate, with its seasonal rainfall patterns.

According to the excavations, it could be said that in an iciiiop the site was created for the use of semi-sedentary groups, or of incipient agriculture, which, unlike the groups registered in the surroundings, such as Tegucigalpa, which are settlements with pyramidal basements medium-sized, this group modified the landscape of the place, creating terraces for residential and agricultural use, with a material culture of equal complexity, as its neighbors with pyramidal structures

Today, this terraces are recognized by the IHAH as an invaluable part of Honduras’ cultural heritage, offering insight into the agricultural ingenuity of ancient Mesoamerican societies in Honduras. While much remains to be discovered about the specific groups that constructed the terraces and their exact purpose, the site stands as evidence of sophisticated and complex agricultural practices that were employed long before the coloniazation of the Americas.

In 2013, the Honduran government, through various agencies focused on tourism, archaeology, and agriculture, initiated a series of explorations. Aerial photographs taken during these investigations revealed the majestic, pyramid-like shape of the Cerro de Hula, further highlighting the site's significance.

The terraces likely served as the most important agricultural center for the surrounding communities. It is believed that a variety of crops were cultivated here, including maize, beans, chili, and squash. These products were distributed among the local population for consumption and trade. The site's irrigation system relied on water transported from nearby rivers, ensuring the fertility of the land.

== See also ==
- Precolumbian Honduras
