= Escuela Nacional de Bellas Artes (Honduras) =

Art school in Honduras

Honduras	National historical monuments of Honduras

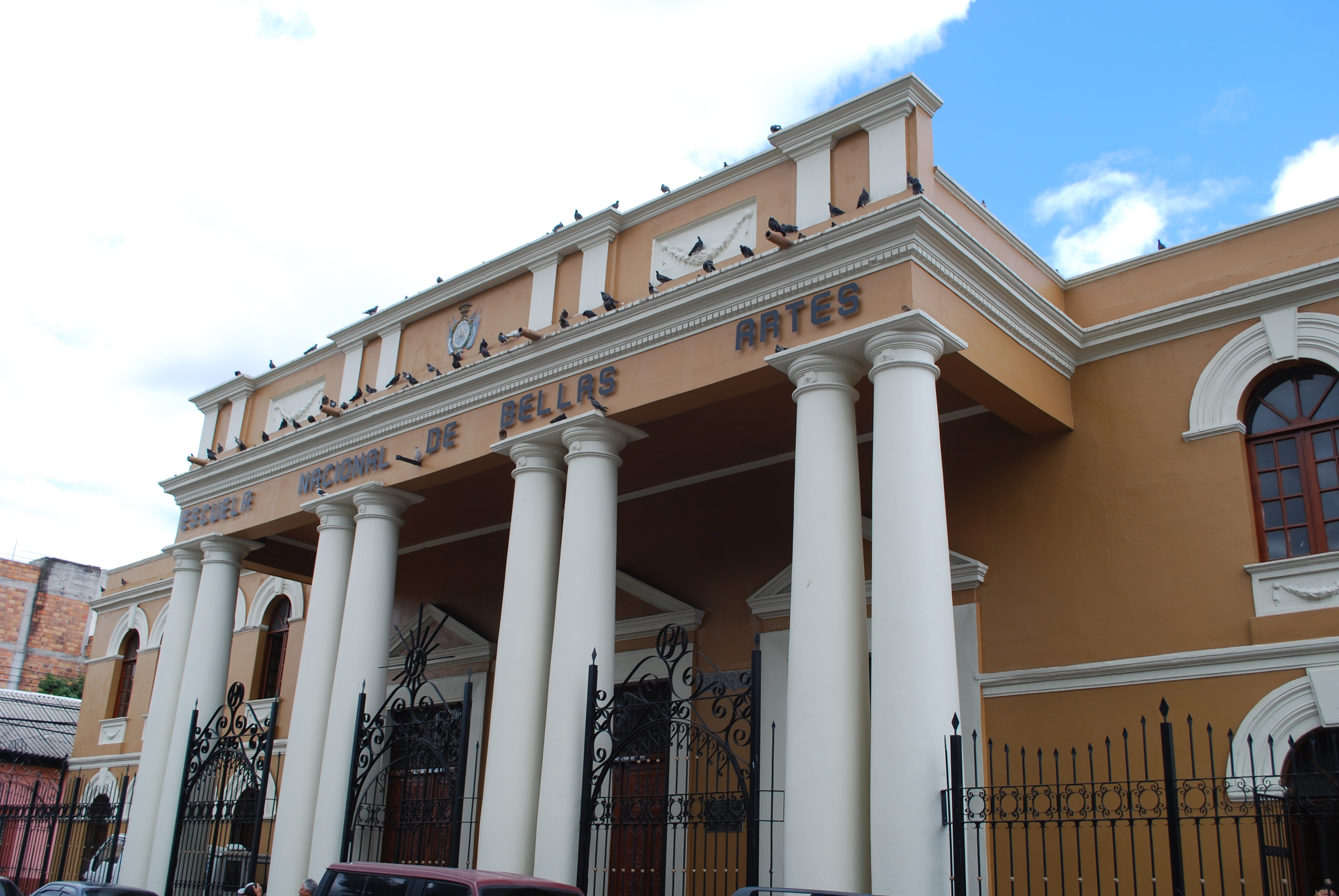
Escuela Nacional de Bellas Artes

The Escuela Nacional de Bellas Artes (ENBA, or National School of Fine Arts), located in Comayagüela, is the main artistic center of education and training of artists in the Republic of Honduras.

== History ==
=== History of the Visual Arts in Honduras ===
The first record of activity in this field dates to April 15, 1878 with the establishment of a school for drawing and painting located in Tegucigalpa. The Academy of Fine Arts and Applied Drawing in the Industrial Arts was created in 1890, founded and directed by Tomás Mur, a Spanish national. The National Academy of Drawing, "Natural Chiaroscuro" was created in 1934 under the direction of Carlos Zúñiga Figueroa and, by 1938, the Escuela de Artes y Oficios (a school for traditional handicrafts) emerged. In that same year, the division of artistic drawing was opened, which led to the creation of the National School of Fine Arts.

=== The School of Fine Arts ===
The National School of Fine Arts (ENBA) was founded in 1940 during the dictatorship of General Tiburcio Carias Andino.

A year and a half before, Carias Andino awarded the artists Arturo López Rodezno, Maximiliano Ramírez Euceda, Samuel Salgado, and Salvador Posadas with a government mandate to create a school for the arts. These artists had themselves proposed the creation of such a school in accordance with the president. The same year they took up residence in the arts building of the ENBA, Street 6, between Avenues 2 and 3, facing La Libertad Park in Comayagüela, Central District. At the start, the ENBA students had classes in drawing, painting, and sculpture. The students painted on canvas mounted on an easel, and the models they painted generally came from Europe.

== Mission ==
The ENBA is an educational institution that offers specialized services in formal and semi-formal visual arts with the goal of contributing to the development of Honduran visual arts, art appreciation, and national and universal culture.

== Vision ==
The ENBA considers itself as a leading institution in the artistic-visual training at every level of the National Educational System, promoting the different manifestations of the visual arts and cultures through the activities of teaching, research, and outreach. Regarding the ENBA's policies for cultural and academic growth, and support for the teaching-learning process, ENBA sets for the following short-, medium-, and long-term goals:

- Determine a process of reform that defines the administrative and academic regulations.
- Establish a mechanism of financial self-management with the goal of strengthening the academic process and the institution's cultural reach.
- Formulate and promote a proposal for creating a degree in visual arts with distinct specialties.
- Achieve the construction of a new building that houses the facilities of what will be the New National School of Fine Arts and the creation of an interactive-didactic visual arts museum.

== Historical and legal issues ==
In 1940, the National School of Fine Arts was created and housed under the Ministry of Development, Commerce and Industry, offering courses and diplomas to the graduates of the sixth grade in the modalities of: drawing, perspective, paint, sculpture, design, ceramics, wood carving, and religious sculpture, studied over five years.

In 1953, the school became part of the Ministry of Education. In 1956, the curriculum for secondary school graduates and primary school teachers was created, granting the degree of teacher of drawing and modeling, which took two years. This curriculum disappeared in 1965.

In 1966, the curriculum of teacher of visual arts was introduced for graduates of the common cycle of general culture. This modality replaced the drawing and modeling curriculum and lasted until the year 1975 when the agreement of Legalization of Degrees and Diplomas Granted since 1940 was issued.

In 1976, the National School of Fine Arts was created by law and, that same year, the curriculum for teachers in visual arts was created, which ran until 2005. In 1980, the diploma in graphic arts was created. 1993 saw the creation of the curriculum for a diploma in fine arts, which is still in use today. In 2003, the diploma of science with a concentration in visual arts education was created within the framework of the national schools transformation, replacing the previously mentioned curriculum for teachers in the visual arts.

=== Institutional framework 1940–2018 ===
The National School of Fine Arts is a public educational institution of for mid-level training in visual arts, unique in its genre and academic level. The school depends on the Secretary of Education through the departmental direction of Francisco Morazán. Its curricula is composed of three modalities of study at a diversified level:

- Diploma in visual arts
- Diploma in graphic arts
- Diploma in artistic training and cultural management

In the framework of informal education, the school offers free courses in artistic education and courses for children in painting and drawing.

This educational center has, so far, has been very important in Honduran society because of its contribution to the development of visual arts and national culture. It has trained more than 90% of the creators, philosophers, and educators of art.

=== Academy ===
Formal academic activity is done through three modalities of study.

- Diploma in visual arts: This course of study aims to endow its students with knowledge in artistic theory and practice that allows them to produce works of art, with the intention that students become artistic representatives of the country. In addition to training them as professionals in the field, it prepares them to face future personal challenges, that of participating in society and choosing to pursue higher studies. This course is based on aesthetic and visual creativity, artistic promotion, human relations and professional ethics, critical judgement, national identity, and democratic attitude.
- Diploma in graphic arts: This course aims to provide its students with artistic and scientific techniques that allow them to develop as professionals in the field of visual communication performing as graphic designers. It also trains them in the scientific-humanist area, which will enable them to pursue higher studies.
- Teaching in visual arts: This course of study aims to provide its students with pedagogical, artistic, and scientific knowledge to introduce them to the development of necessary competencies in teaching visual arts, as well as prepare them to continue with higher studies in this field.

From 1977 until 2006, 1,034 young people from different areas of the country have graduated from ENBA in these areas of study. From 1957 to 1976, 154 young people graduated, making a total of 1,188 professionals in this field.

=== Specific curricular reforms in educational training ===
The ENBA designed and implemented diverse curricular models in response to social demands and specific historical moments. In the first years of its operation, the ENBA offered courses and diplomas to sixth-grade graduates in the areas of: drawing, perspective, painting, sculpture, decoration, ceramics, wood carving, and religious sculpture. These were developed as five-year programs.

By 1956, the program for secondary school graduates and primary education teachers was created. This course of study took two years and granted graduates the title of teacher of drawing and modeling. In 1966, ENBA began offering a curriculum for teacher of visual arts for graduates of the common cycle of general culture. This replaced the teacher of drawing and modeling program and lasted until 1975. This program took three years to complete.

In 1976, ENBA began offering a program for teachers of visual arts, which ran until 2005. In 1975, the agreement of Legalization of Titles and Diplomas granted from 1940 until 1975 was issued; it "created" the ENBA by law, assigned to the Executive Department of Arts.

In 2003, ENBA began offering the diploma of sciences with orientation in visual arts (BEP in Spanish) in the framework of the reforms of normal and artistic education, presented by the Secretary of Education. This process lasted only five years.

In 2008, under the agreement 1710- SE-2008, ENBA again started teacher training under the curriculum for teachers of primary education in visual arts, a three-year program that is still running today. Since 2005, this institution has aimed to elevate the artistic training.

In 2015, ENBA converted its degrees to a professional technical diploma (BTP in Spanish) in three fields or areas: BTP in design, BTP in cultural and educational management, and BTP in visual arts.

== Cultural activity ==
The ENBA conducts or has conducted the following events:

- Annual exhibitions of visual arts of its students, graduates, and invited guests
- Enseñarte project in Honduras
- Academic tours
- Creating artistic projects in the frameworks of social educational works, technical practices, and professional practices
- Developing workshops for educators in visual arts training
- Creating and publishing a magazine, manuals, and educational texts and materials
- Participating in two visual arts conferences in Latin America and internationally
- Organizing and developing conferences on art, culture, and society featuring well-known visual artists, sociologists, and writers from Honduras and other countries
- Participating in exhibitions and contests at the national and international level
- Serving as part of the jury of the Pablo Zelaya Sierra National Art Prize
- Serving as part of biennial juries at an international level
- Creating and awarding the ITZAMNA prize over a period of six consecutive years.
- Organizing three meetings of national and international artists
- Collaborating on the Biennial of the National Autonomous University of Honduras, the Honduran Institute of Inter-American Culture, and the Anthology of Visual Arts
- Running demonstrations in public places throughout the country on the processes of creating artistic work

== Itzamná Prize ==
The Itzamná National Art Prize is an award that the ENBA grants to notable national artists that develop in their respective disciplines. It has been awarded to:

- Writer Eduardo Bähr (1981) in literature
- Director of cinema Sami Kafati (1982) for being cinematographic pioneer in Honduras with his work Mi Amigo Ángel ("My Friend Angel")
- Writer José Adán Castelar (1982) in literature
- Writer Rigoberto Walls (1983) in literature
- Writer Marcos Carías Zapata (1984) in literature

== ENBA Teachers ==
Among ENBAs teachers are:

- Alfredo Ruiz Barrier
- Arturo López Rodezno
- Carlos Zuñiga Figueroa
- Carlos Garay
- Dante Lazzaroni Andean
- José Rony Castillo
- Horace Reina
- Mario M. Castillo
- Mario Mejía Turcios
- Maximiliano Ramírez Euceda
- Pablo Zelaya Sierra
- Raúl Fiallos
- Teresa Victoria Fortín Franco
- Pastor Sabillón Fernández

A new generation of artists from the school includes:

- Blas Aguilar
- Gabriel Zaldibar
- Víctor López
- Oscar Mendoza
- Víctor Hugo Cruz
- Gilberto Videz
- Teresa Silva
- Marcia Ney Rivera
- Delmer Mejia
- Antonio Baquedano
- Luis Enrique Cruz
- Juan Sunday Torres Q.D.D.G.
- Ernesto Argueta
- Luci Martínez
- Rafael Cáceres
- Daniel Rivera
- Kelvin Reyes
- Medardo Cardona

== ENBA Graduates ==
Notable graduates from the ENBA include:

- Arleth Castillo
- Álvaro Channels
- Ánibal Cruz
- Armando Lara
- Mario Zamora Alcantara
- Miguel Ángel Ruiz Matute
- Moses Becerra
- Monica Andino
- Nury Reina de Toffe
- Ricardo Aguilar
- Virgil A. Guardiola
- Leonel Benítez Efraín
- Jesús Antonio Zelaya
- Arturo Luna
- Delmer Mejía
- David Soto
- Luis Hernán Padilla
- Ezequiel Padilla Ayestas
- Julio Visquerra
- Margarita Velásquez
- Dino Mario Fanconi Moncada
- Isabel Membreño
- Hermes Armijo Maletz
- José Joaquín Urquía García
- Francis Spanish of Ayala
- Patricia Toledo Bautista
- Vladimir Sabillón

== The ENBA today ==
The ENBA survives on support from institutions and the government, although most of its funding comes from student fees.

Beginning with the school's 50th anniversary, from 1990 to 2007, the ENBA together with the Spanish Cultural Center in Tegucigalpa and the Secretary of State for Culture, Arts and Sports, organized the Anthology of Honduran Visual Arts. The Anthology, published yearly on November 15, is to encourage and document the annual creativity, as well as develop the ENBA's social outlook. Every year the school also pays homage to a Honduran arts teacher.

In 2009, ENBA had 260 students but enrollment levels had declined by 2015, when only 236 students were enrolled, despite the scholarships and financial aid awarded.

=== Degrees ===
The institution offers mid-level training in visual arts, which is unique in genre and academic level.

- Technical professional diploma in visual-artistic design
- Technical professional diploma in visual arts
- Technical professional diploma in artistic training and cultural management

== Budget ==
The government of Honduras decided to invest an additional 18 billion Lempiras (US $933 million) between 2001 and 2015, on social projects in education, health and culture amounting to 35% of the budget for the strategy to reduce poverty.

This investment is one more component of the already decided and pre-established budget for these sectors, something the government has not made, instead maintaining the National School of Fine Arts working with a lowered budget. As of May 2014, the government had not delivered the 2013 budget. Furthermore, in 2012, the National Congress eliminated the $15/month scholarship set aside for each of the school's students. Art has been ignored in Honduras. For example, the maximum prize that a national artist can aspire to win is the Pablo Zelaya Sierra National Art Prize, which only consists of an annual monetary award of US $500.

== See also ==
- Art in Honduras
- Culture of Honduras
- Education in Honduras
- Annex:Teachers of the National School of Fine arts (Honduras)
- Annex:Artists graduated in National School of Fine arts (Honduras)
