= Arnoldo José Avilés García =

Honduran politician

Arnoldo José Aviles García (born September 13, 1968) is a Honduran politician. A member of the National Party of Honduras, he represents the Francisco Morazan Department. Aviles García served as a deputy of the National Congress of Honduras from 2006 to 2010. He also worked as an electrical engineer.
