= Tatumbla =

- Municipality
- Location in Honduras
- Coordinates: 14°1′0″N 87°6′0″W
- Country: Honduras
- Department: Francisco Morazán

Area
  - Total: 81 km^{2} (31 sq mi)

Population (2015)
  - Total: 7,587
  - Density: 94/km^{2} (240/sq mi)
- Climate: Cwb

Tatumbla is a municipality in the Honduran department of Francisco Morazán.

Tatumbla is located in the mountains above Tegucigalpa, about a 45-minute bus ride.

As of 2013 census, the population of Tatumbla is 7,197.
