= San Buenaventura, Honduras =

San Buenaventura
- Municipality
- Location in Honduras
- Coordinates: 13°54′N 87°12′W
- Country: Honduras
- Department: Francisco Morazán Department

Area
  - Total: 65 km^{2} (25 sq mi)

Population (2015)
  - Total: 2,899
  - Density: 45/km^{2} (120/sq mi)

San Buenaventura is a municipality in the Honduran department of Francisco Morazán.
