= Reitoca =

- Municipality
- Location in Honduras
- Coordinates: 13°50′N 87°28′W
- Country: Honduras
- Department: Francisco Morazán

Area
  - Total: 197 km^{2} (76 sq mi)

Population (2015)
  - Total: 10,713
  - Density: 54.4/km^{2} (141/sq mi)

Reitoca is a municipality in the Honduran department of Francisco Morazán.

The name derives from Rerituca, which means "Place of the soft juncus" in Nahuatl.
