= Juan Ramón Molina =

Honduran poet

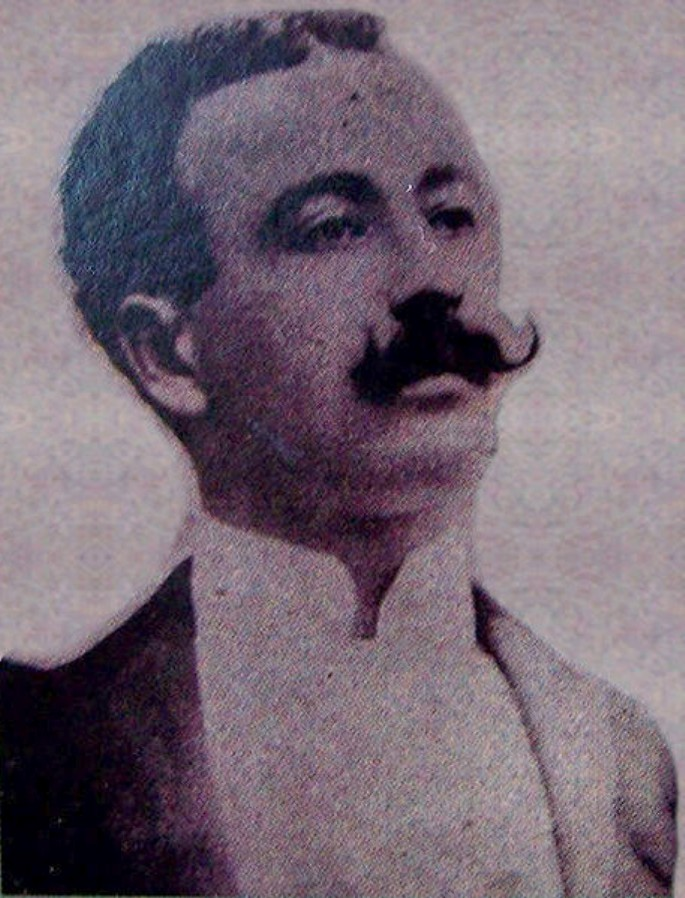
Juan Ramón Molina

Juan Ramón Molina (1875–1908) was a national Honduran poet. The National Library Juan Ramón Molina, being the national library of Honduras, was named after him in 2009. In 1954, the Juan Ramón Molina Bridge was built in his honor.
