= Vallecillo, Honduras =

Vallecillo
- Municipality
- Location in Honduras
- Coordinates: 14°31′0″N 87°24′0″W
- Country: Honduras
- Department: Francisco Morazán

Area
  - Total: 234 km^{2} (90 sq mi)

Population (2015)
  - Total: 8,533
  - Density: 36.5/km^{2} (94.4/sq mi)

Vallecillo is a municipality in the Honduran department of Francisco Morazán. It was previously a part of Cedros municipality until 1986. On December 5, 1986, the Municipality of Vallecillo was created from several villages formerly belonging to the Municipality of Cedros. It is a municipality with an agricultural economy, primarily focused on corn and bean cultivation, although coffee farming is the most prominent economic activity. Hugo Eleazar Flores Valladares was elected mayor of the municipality, replacing Eva Lucía Lambur Valle, in the general election for the 2014-2018 term.
