= La Venta, Honduras =

La Venta
- Municipality
- Location in Honduras
- Coordinates: 13°45′N 87°19′W
- Country: Honduras
- Department: Francisco Morazán

Area
  - Total: 126 km^{2} (49 sq mi)

Population (2015)
  - Total: 6,291
  - Density: 49.9/km^{2} (129/sq mi)
- Climate: Aw

La Venta (or La Venta del Sur) is a municipality in the south of the Honduran department of Francisco Morazán.

It is approximately 52 km from the national capital, Tegucigalpa, and lies just off the Pan-American Highway.

The town has valuable forestry assets, and the main form of employment locally is agriculture, particularly of plums and other soft fruits.
