= Maraita =

- Municipality
- Location in Honduras
- Coordinates: 13°53′N 87°02′W
- Country: Honduras
- Department: Francisco Morazán

Area
  - Total: 258 km^{2} (100 sq mi)

Population (2015)
  - Total: 6,809
  - Density: 26.4/km^{2} (68.4/sq mi)
- Climate: Aw

Maraita (Spanish pronunciation: [maˈɾajta]) is a municipality in the Honduran department of Francisco Morazán.
