= Pablo Zelaya Sierra =

Pablo Zelaya Sierra (October 30, 1896 – 1933) was a Honduran artist and painter. The highest National Prize for Honduran artists carries his name as a tribute.

== Biography ==
=== Parents and first years ===
Zelaya Sierra was born on October 30, 1896, in the municipality of Ojojona, Francisco Morazán Department. His parents were Felipe Zelaya and Isabel Sierra. From early childhood, he developed his artistic interests and made his way to study at the School of Fine Arts in the neighboring Republic of Costa Rica in 1918–1919.

=== Decade in Spain ===
In 1920, Zelaya Sierra traveled to Madrid to study art at the Royal Academy of Fine arts of Saint Fernando, thanks to a scholarship from the Spanish Cooperation Agency in Honduras, thus becoming a disciple of Manuel Benedito and Daniel Vázquez Díaz, one of the major Spanish painters who also lived in Paris beside Pablo Picasso, Juan Gris and Joan Miró.

During his time in Europe, Zelaya Sierra participated in the following events and exhibitions:

- National exhibition (Paris, 1922)
- Salon d'Automne and National Exhibition (Paris, 1924)
- Exhibition of the Society of Iberian Artists (Paris, 1925)
- Individual exhibitions Salon des Independents (Paris, 1924)
- Salon of the Heraldo de Madrid (1930)
- Ateneo de Madrid (1932)

Zelaya Sierra is also the author of an art manifesto: Aiming with a Pencil (1932), a significant document in understanding the art of his times.

The strong and productive ideas of Zelaya Sierra enabled the birth of the modern art in Honduras.

=== Death ===
In 1932, back in his native Honduras, his health began to deteriorate. He was rushed to the Saint Felipe Hospital, where he died at the age of 36 due to a massive stroke.

== Work ==
In Zelaya Sierra's proposal, there is a multiplicity of formal appropriations that range from the use of Renaissance Chiaroscuro to the concepts of the Spanish painting movement of the period, and then progress into cubism. This was achieved later through his teachers Benedito and Vásquez Díaz.

Zelaya Sierra assumed aesthetic conditions like gravitational core, finding no problems on focusing closely on the Honduran social reality of the times. In fact, his iconography in 1932 features paintings illustrating the social and political conflicts of the times, such as "Brothers against Brothers", a magnificent painting in which he gathered the deep pain and the fear prevalent during one of the many guerras intestinas (civil wars) that shook the Honduran country in that decade. The painting marks his way of denouncing the harm and pain that a man inflicts upon his fellow men during a civil war. It is a moving, terrible and violent painting.

== Homage ==
- The National Prize for the Honduran Arts carries his name in his honour.
- In 1991, the Cultural Center of Spain in Tegucigalpa devoted the II Anthology of the Plastic and Visual Arts of Honduras to “Pablo Zelaya Sierra”.

== See also ==
- Culture of Honduras
- Painting of Honduras
- Art in Honduras
- José Antonio Velásquez
- Maximiliano Ramírez Euceda
- Moses Becerra
- Arturo Moon
- Francisco Alvarado Juárez
- Carlos Zúñiga Figueroa

== Bibliography ==
- Martínez, José Francisco. ”Honduran literature and his generational process” New editions University, Number 28 of Collection Honduran Letters. Autonomous National University of Honduras, University Publisher. 1987.
