= Alubarén =

- Municipality
- Location in Honduras
- Coordinates: 13°48′N 87°28′W
- Country: Honduras
- Department: Francisco Morazán

Area
  - Total: 48 km^{2} (19 sq mi)

Population (2015)
  - Total: 5,558
  - Density: 120/km^{2} (300/sq mi)
- Climate: Aw

Alubarén is a municipality in the Honduran department of Francisco Morazán. The majority of its population is dedicated to agriculture, livestock, forestry and fishing.

== Population ==
The population as of 2020 was 5,616.
