= La Libertad, Francisco Morazán =

La Libertad
- Municipality
- Location in Honduras
- Coordinates: 13°42′0″N 87°28′0″W
- Country: Honduras
- Department: Francisco Morazán

Area
  - Total: 42 km^{2} (16 sq mi)

Population (2015)
  - Total: 2,482
  - Density: 59/km^{2} (150/sq mi)
- Climate: Aw

La Libertad (Spanish pronunciation: [la liβeɾˈtað]) is a municipality in the Honduran department of Francisco Morazán.
