= Nueva Armenia =

- Municipality
- Location in Honduras
- Coordinates: 13°45′N 87°10′W
- Country: Honduras
- Department: Francisco Morazán

Area
  - Total: 169 km^{2} (65 sq mi)

Population (2015)
  - Total: 3,689
  - Density: 21.8/km^{2} (56.5/sq mi)
- Climate: Aw

Nueva Armenia (Spanish pronunciation: [ˈnweβa aɾˈmenja]) is a municipality in the Honduran department of Francisco Morazán.
