= Santa Lucía, Francisco Morazán =

Santa Lucía
- Municipality
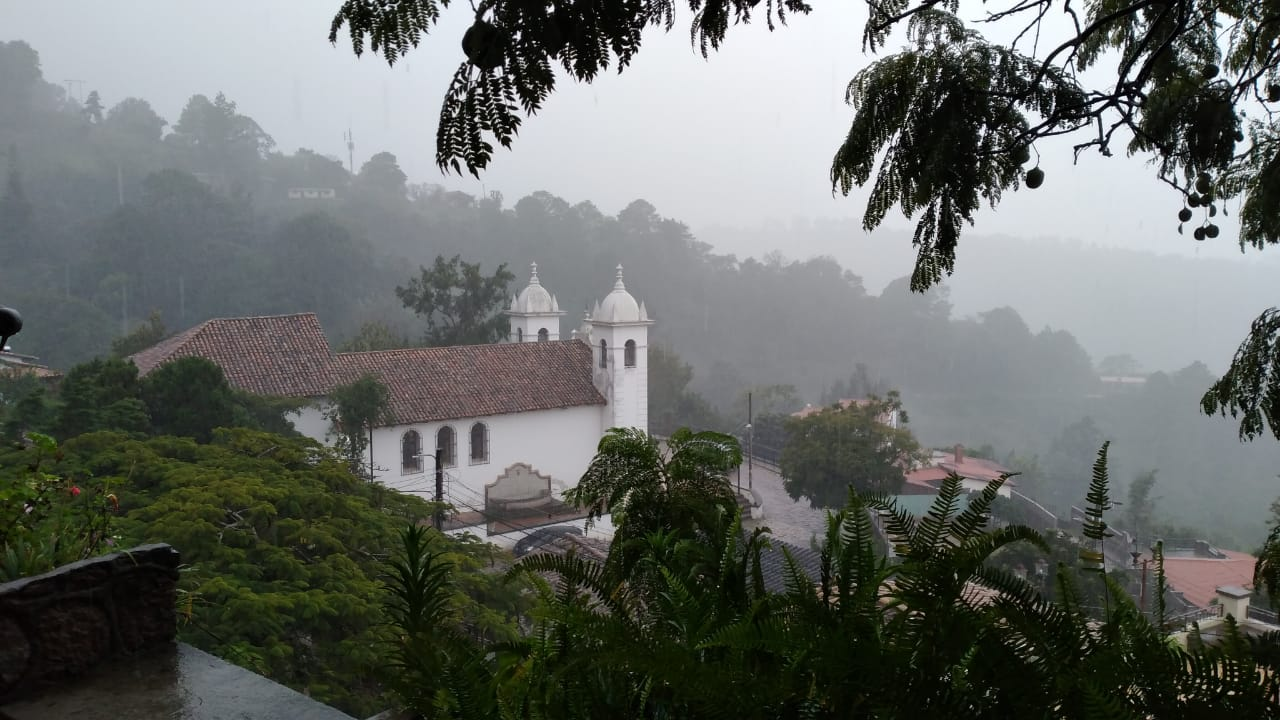

- Location in Honduras
- Coordinates: 14°5′6″N 87°5′6″W
- Country: Honduras
- Department: Francisco Morazán

Area
  - Total: 65 km^{2} (25 sq mi)

Population (2015)
  - Total: 12,894
  - Density: 200/km^{2} (510/sq mi)

Santa Lucía (Spanish pronunciation: [ˈsanta luˈsi.a]) is a municipality in the Honduran department of Francisco Morazán.

== History ==
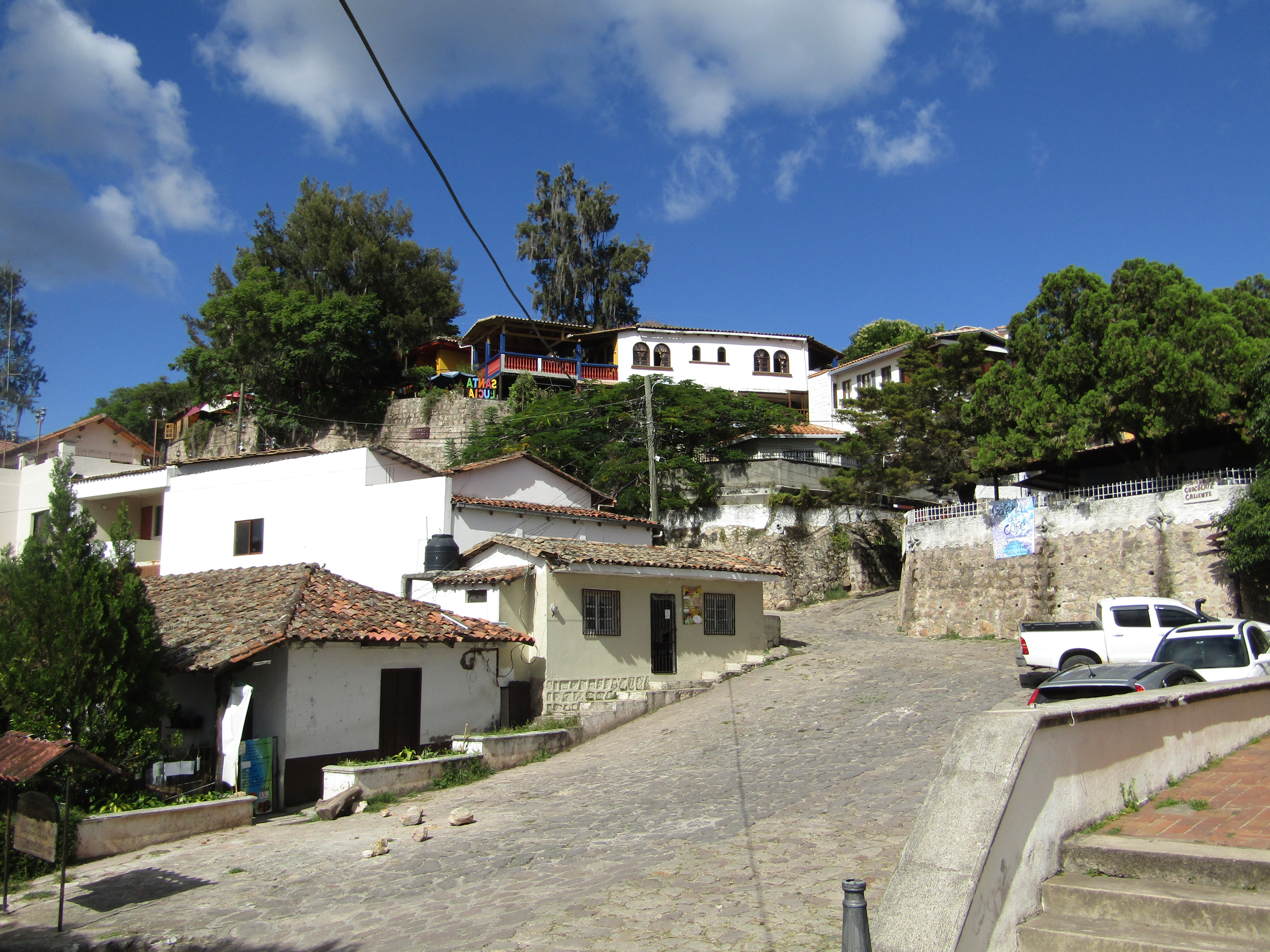
Colonial Street in Santa Lucia

There is no exact data on its beginnings, although it is known that it is one of the oldest towns, that it was inhabited before the arrival of the Spanish. Although some writers have affirmed that mining began in 1580, there are documents that indicate that around 1540 it had already been visited by the first Spanish explorers who were looking for mineral veins and then began to exploit its rich mines.

On November 12, 1820, Santa Lucía was established as a municipality in the Department of Tegucigalpa.

== Tourism ==
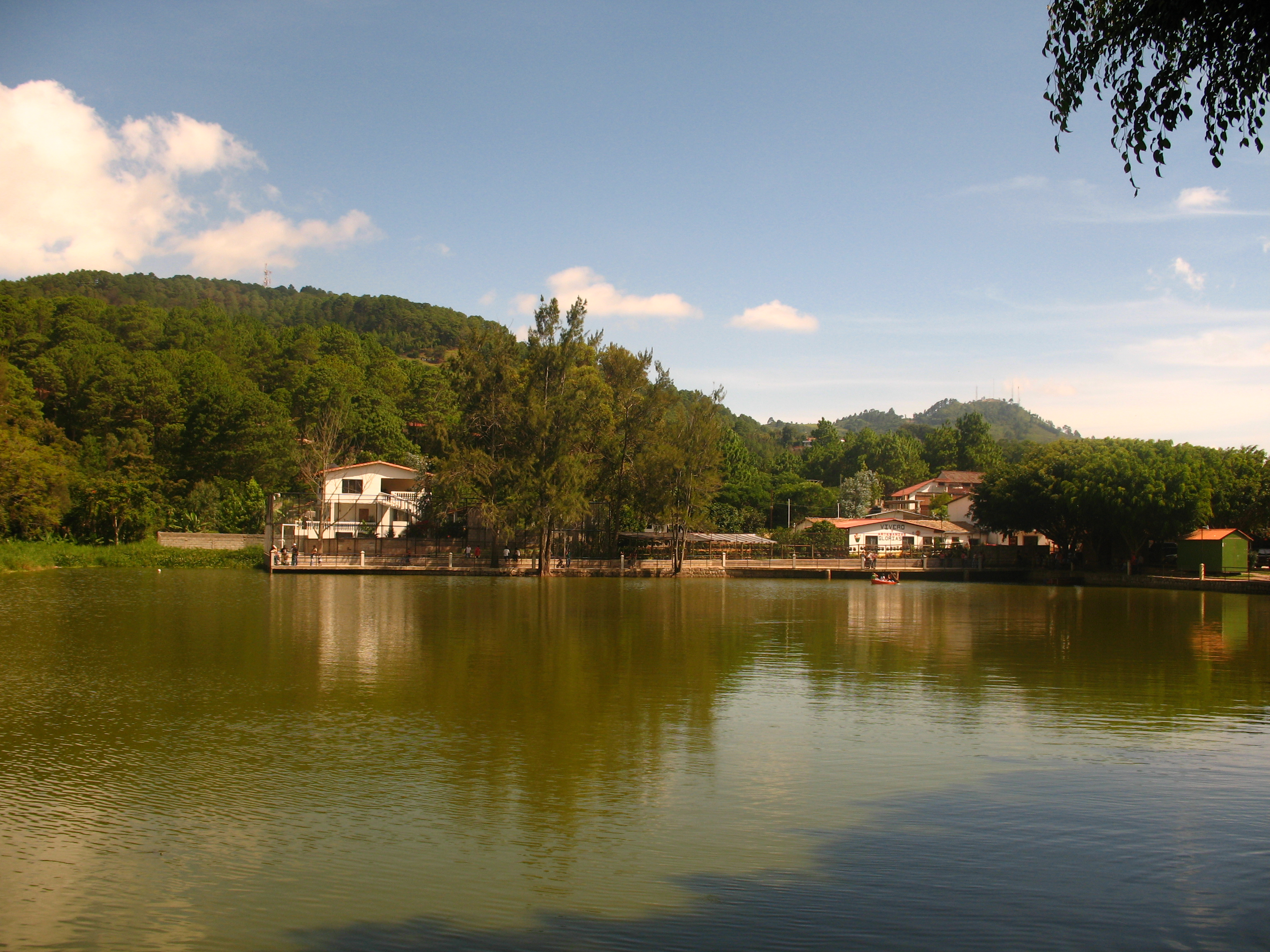
Santa Lucia lagoon

Santa Lucia is a common tourist destination for those who visit the Tegucigalpa. With a mild climate, the main town can be comfortably explored on foot starting with a lagoon full of life in which you can rent rowing boats to explore it. The historic center of Santa Lucia is one of the best preserved in Honduras.

The town is full of scenic views, including views of Tegucigalpa. Santa Lucia is home to several restaurants and cafes. The town boasts well-preserved original colonial structures, from houses, stone streets, and its church.

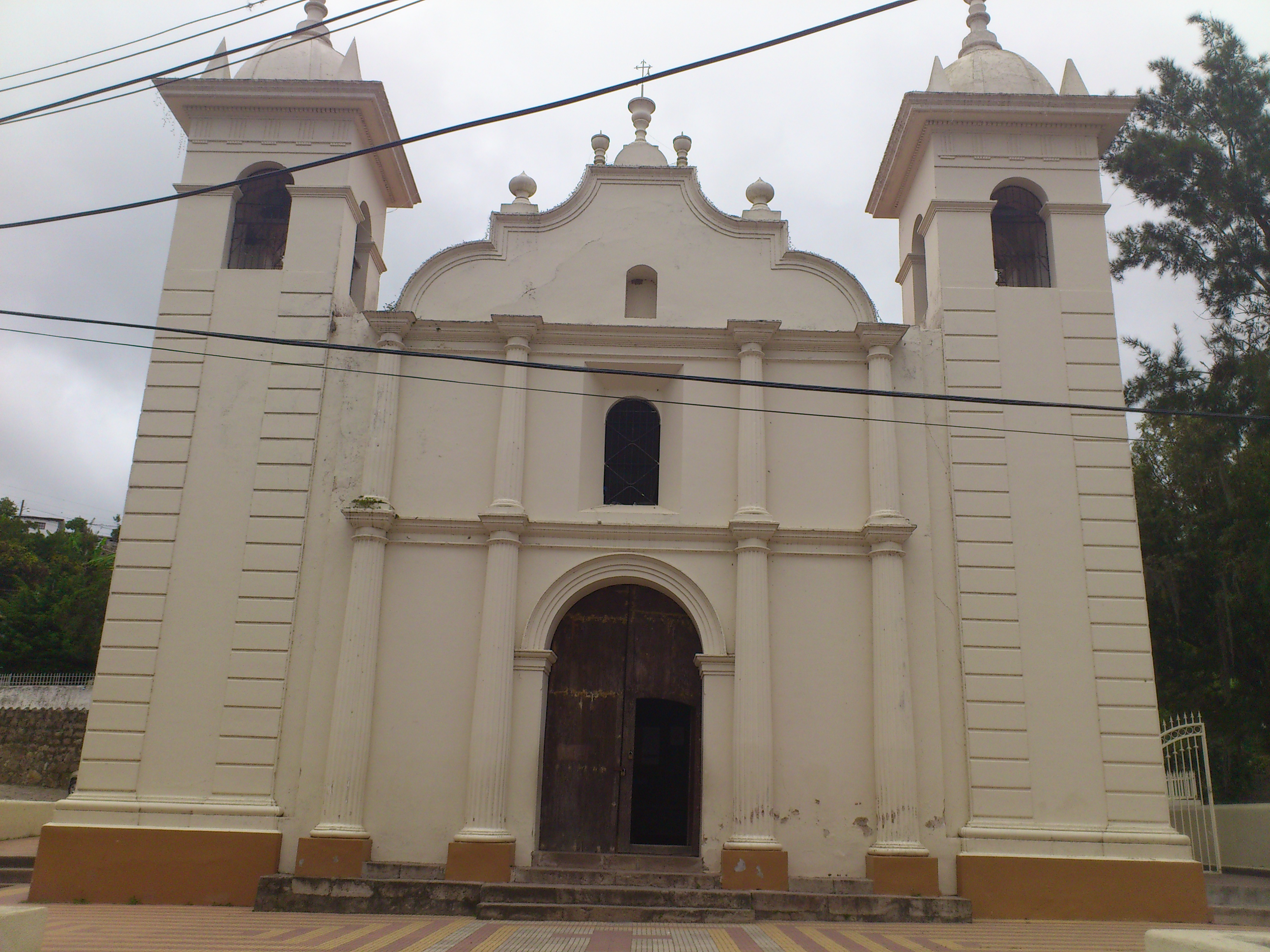
Señor de las mercedes (Lord of Mercy) church

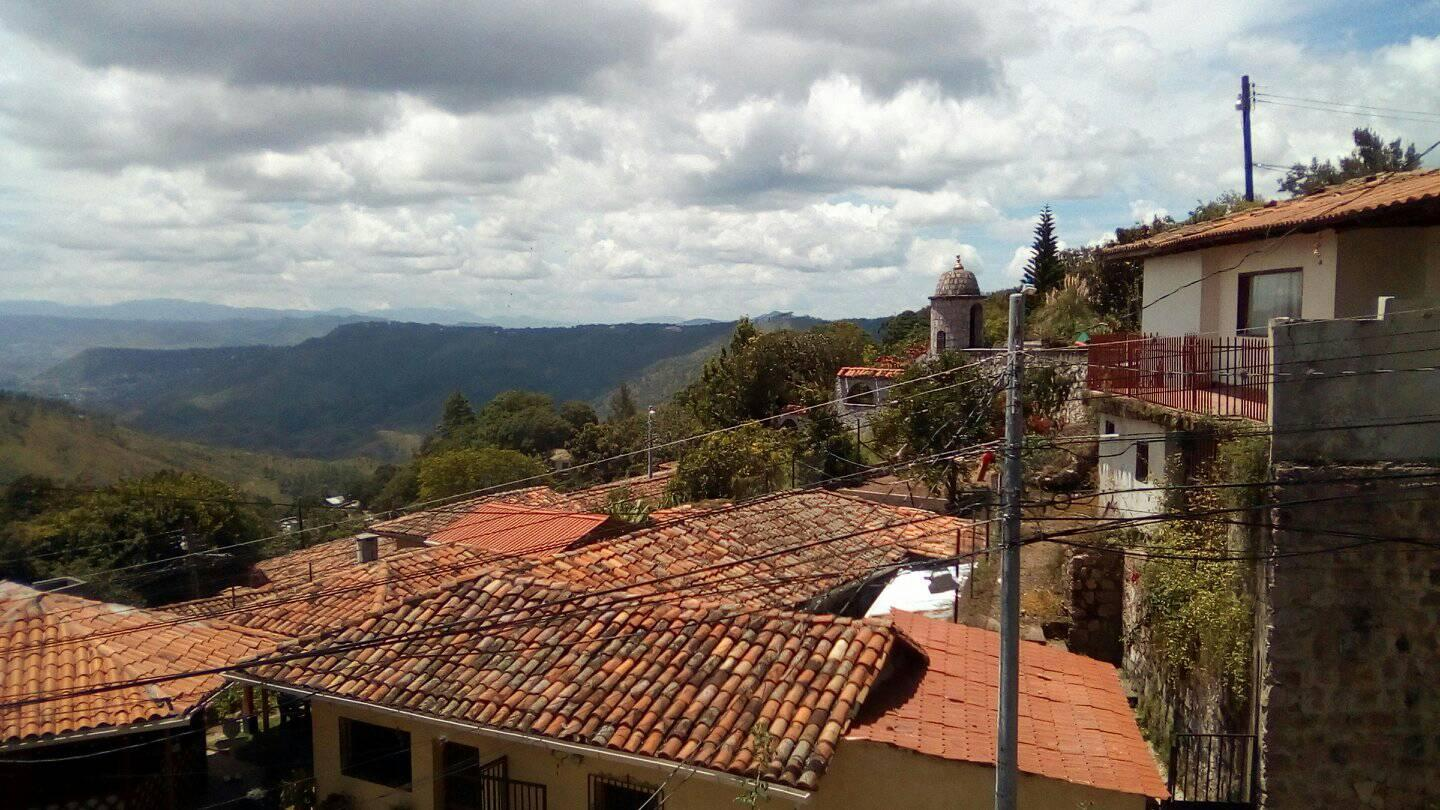

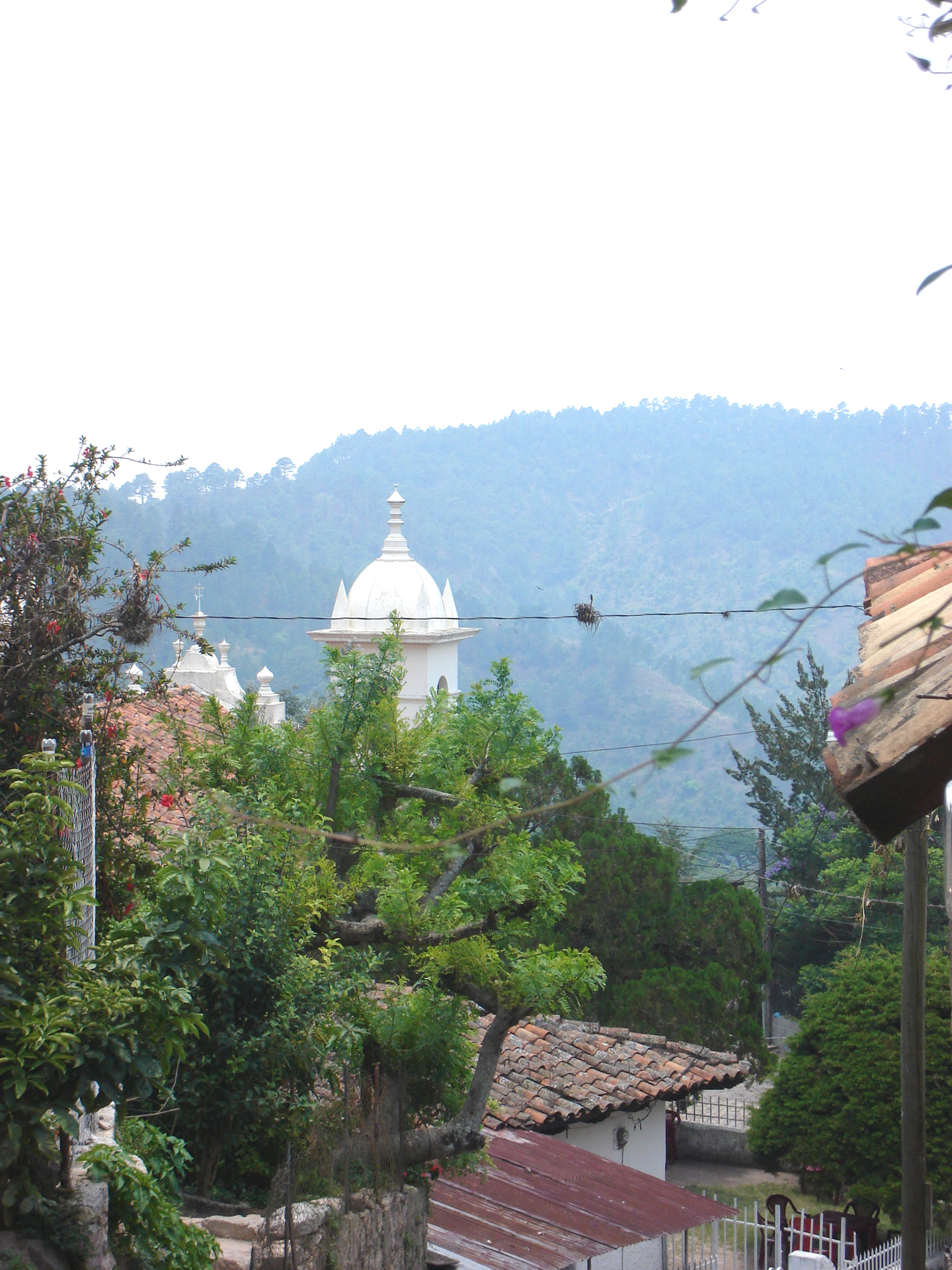

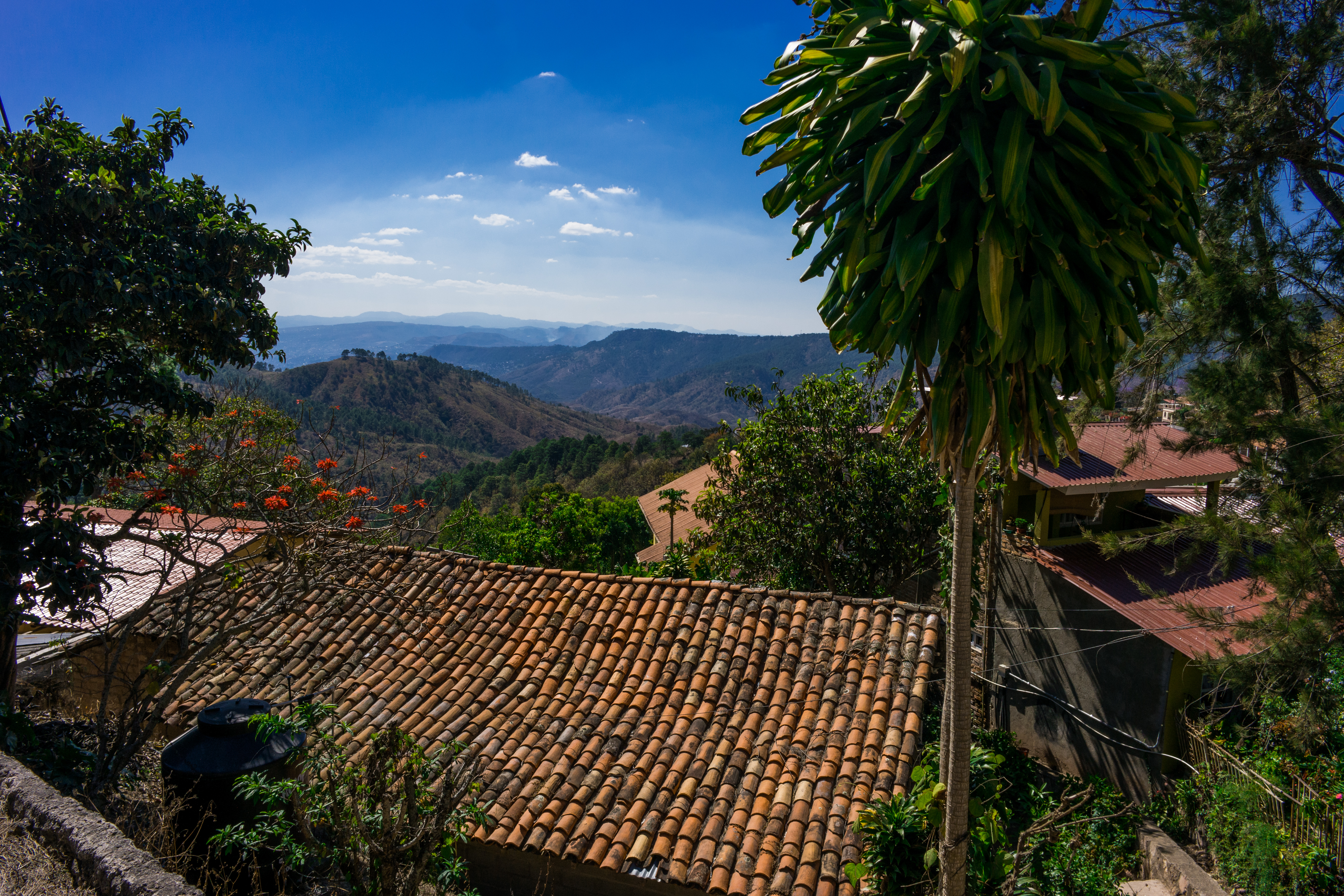

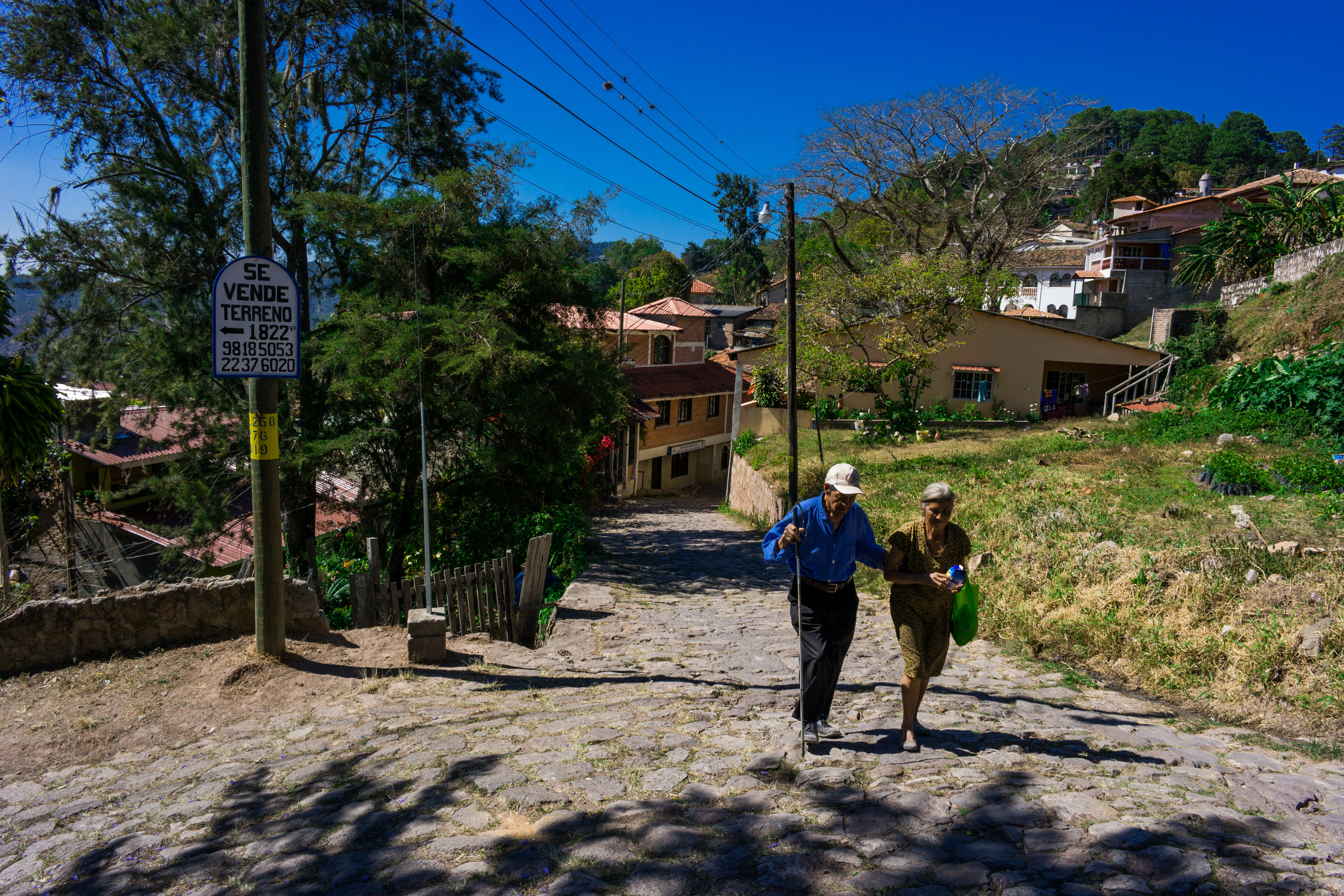
