= Yuscarán =

- Municipality
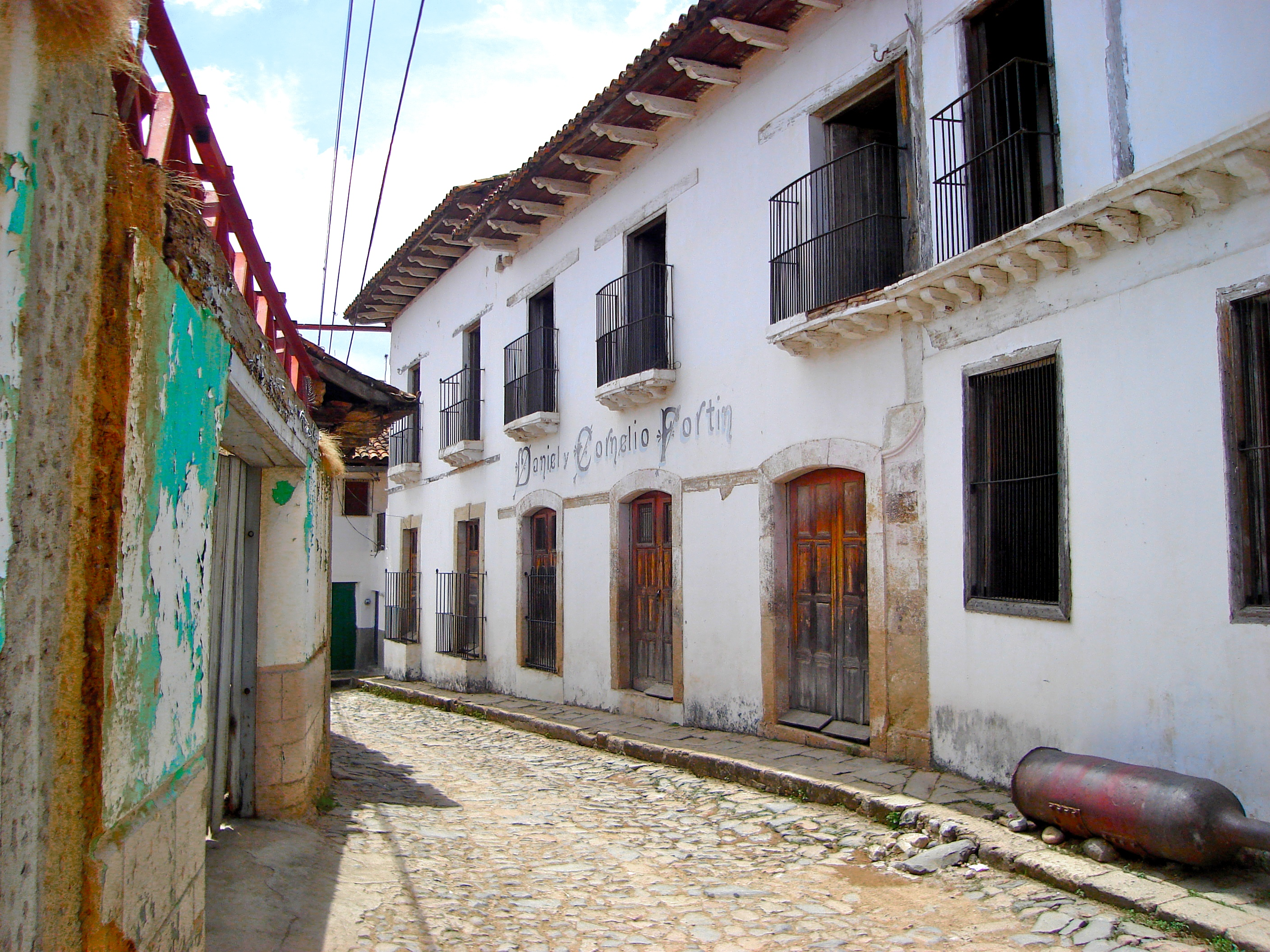
- A street in Yuscarán

- Location in Honduras
- Coordinates: 13°56′N 86°49′W
- Country: Honduras
- Department: El Paraíso
- Founded: 1737

Area
  - Municipality: 332 km^{2} (128 sq mi)

Population (2023 projection)
  - Municipality: 17,117
  - Density: 51.6/km^{2} (134/sq mi)
  - Urban: 5,763

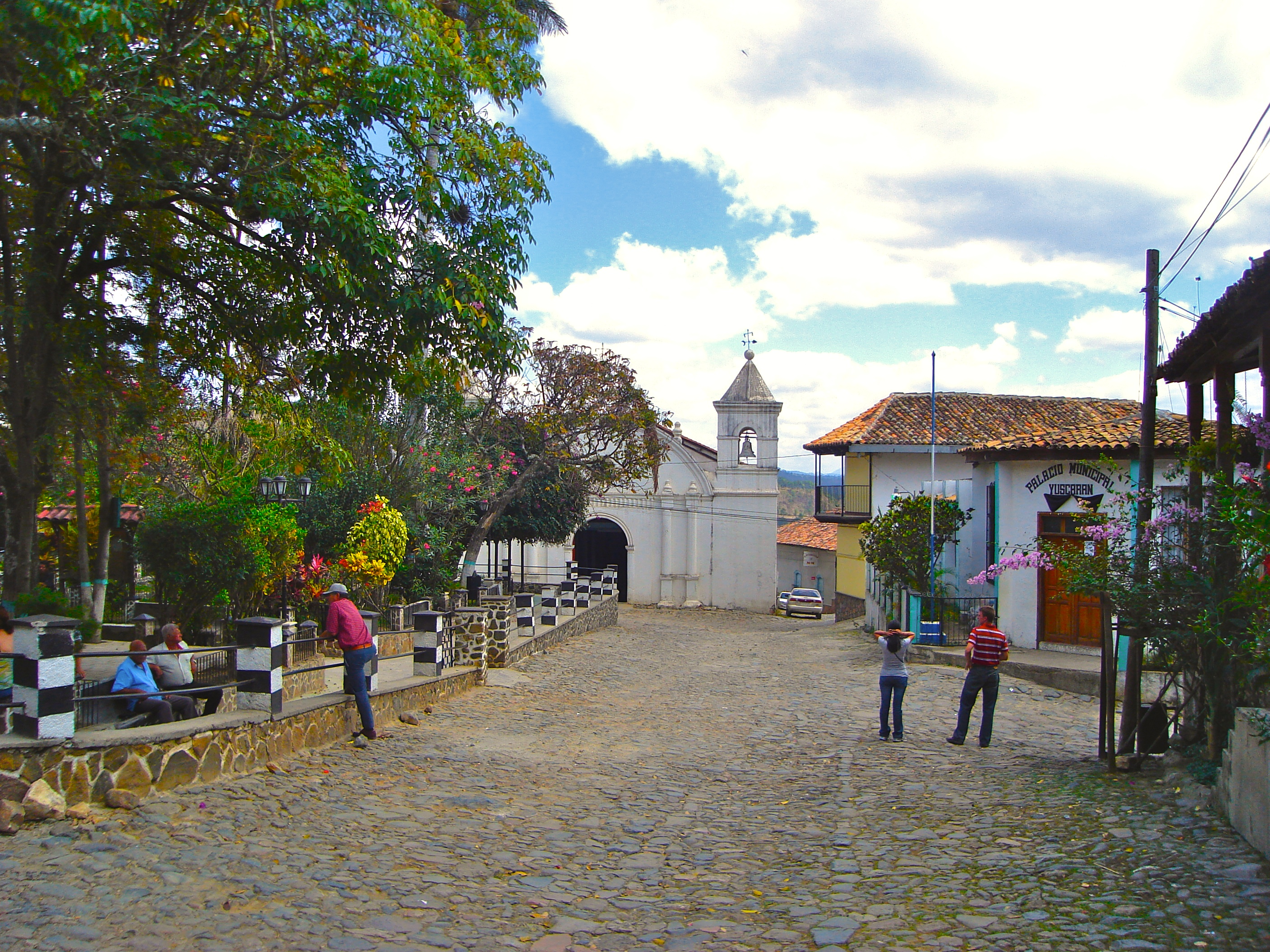
A park and church in Yuscarán

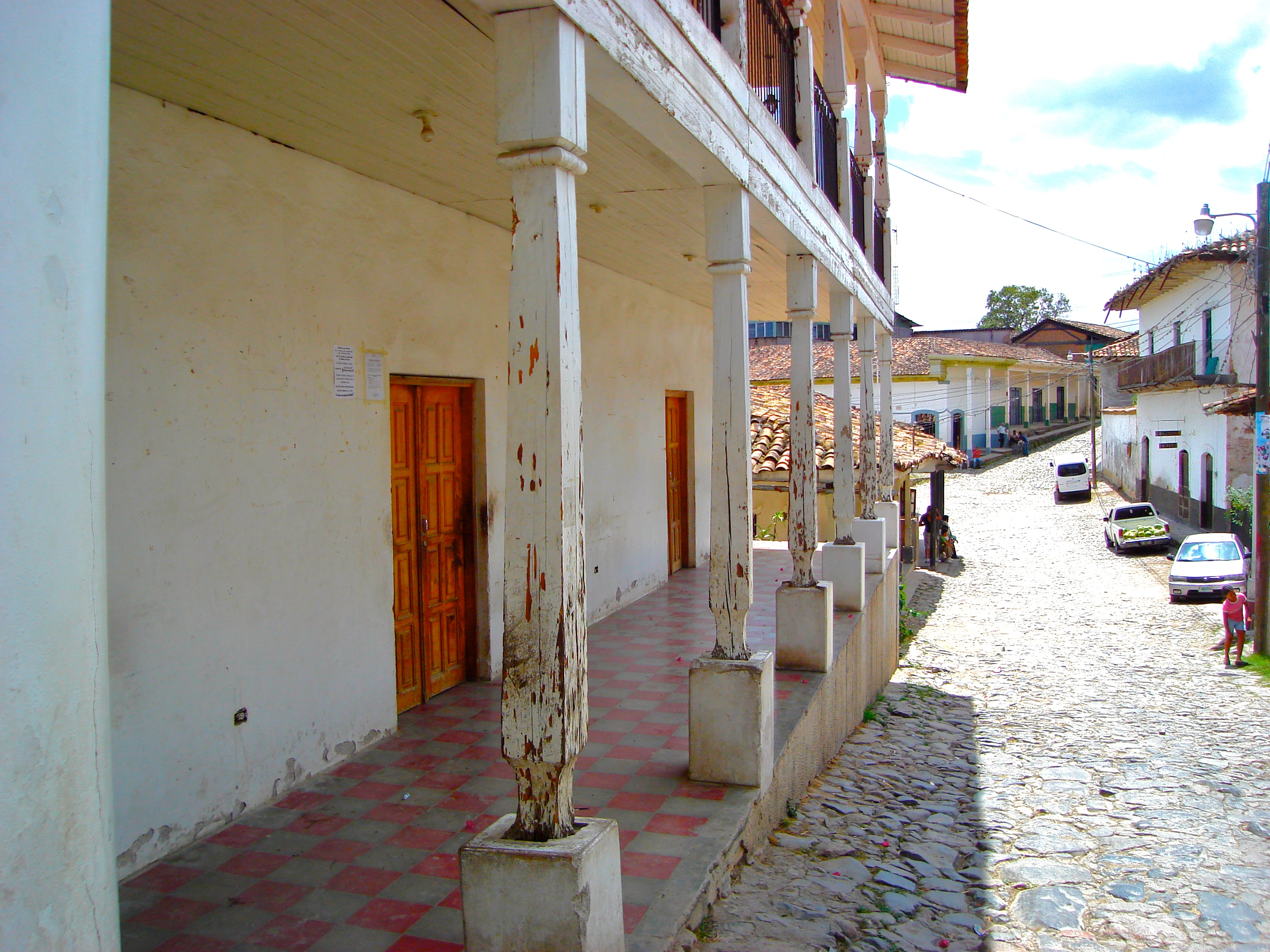
Colonial architecture in Yuscarán

Yuscarán is a town, with a population of 2,550 (2023 calculation), and a municipality in Honduras. It is the capital of the El Paraíso department. It is located 65 kilometers from Tegucigalpa. And was founded by Juan Diego Sierra.

== History ==
The municipality of Yuscarán was founded in 1730. After gold, silver and other precious metals were found in its foothills in 1746, Spanish mining companies flooded the area and Spaniards settled the town. Thus, Yuscarán was constructed in the traditional colonial style of 18th-century Spain.

Years of exploitation by the Spanish and later by North American mining companies followed, bringing both advantages and disadvantages. At its height, Yuscarán was a wealthy mining town and home to some of Honduras's most influential families. It was one of the first places in Honduras to get electricity in 1898 – even before Tegucigalpa. Because of its importance, it was declared the capital of the El Paraíso Department in 1869. However, after the mining stopped, most of the foreigners supporting Yuscarán abandoned the town, taking their money and possessions with them.

In 1979 Yuscarán was declared a National Monument. In its center there are more than 200 colonial homes.

Natives of Yuscarán include the painter Teresita Fortín.

== Geography ==
The mountain of Montserrat towers over the town to the southeast. This biological reserve is also the main source of water for the area, the same water that the villagers use to produce the Yuscaran-brand sugar cane alcohol aguardiente.

== Economy ==
With the decline of the mining industry came the rise of another industry, from which Yuscarán gets its present-day fame: the fabrication of aguardiente, or guaro. The Yuscarán factory, also called the Distileria del Buen Gusto, was founded in 1939.

== Notable people ==
- Teresita Fortín, painter
