= El Porvenir, Francisco Morazán =

El Porvenir
- Municipality
- Location in Honduras
- Coordinates: 14°45′N 87°11′W
- Country: Honduras
- Department: Francisco Morazán

Area
  - Total: 400 km^{2} (150 sq mi)

Population (2015)
  - Total: 21,669
  - Density: 54/km^{2} (140/sq mi)

El Porvenir is a municipality in the Honduran department of Francisco Morazán.
