= Orica, Francisco Morazán =

Orica
- Municipality
- Location in Honduras
- Coordinates: 14°42′N 86°57′W
- Country: Honduras
- Department: Francisco Morazán

Area
  - Total: 344 km^{2} (133 sq mi)

Population (2015)
  - Total: 14,199
  - Density: 41.3/km^{2} (107/sq mi)
- Climate: Aw

Orica is a municipality in the Honduran department of Francisco Morazán.
