= San Miguelito, Honduras =

San Miguelito
- Municipality
- Location in Honduras
- Coordinates: 13°43′6″N 87°30′0″W
- Country: Honduras
- Department: Francisco Morazán

Area
  - Total: 45 km^{2} (17 sq mi)

Population (2015)
  - Total: 1,931
  - Density: 43/km^{2} (110/sq mi)

San Miguelito (Spanish pronunciation: [ˈsam miɣeˈlito]) is a municipality in the Honduran department of Francisco Morazán.
