= Villa de San Francisco =

- Municipality
- Location in Honduras
- Coordinates: 14°10′N 86°58′W
- Country: Honduras
- Department: Francisco Morazán

Area
  - Total: 84 km^{2} (32 sq mi)

Population (2015)
  - Total: 10,816
  - Density: 130/km^{2} (330/sq mi)
- Climate: Aw

Villa de San Francisco is a municipality in the Honduran department of Francisco Morazán.

Its social network is https://web.archive.org/web/20101014210406/http://www.villadesanfrancisco.com/
