= Juan Ramón Molina National Library =

- Biblioteca Nacional Juan Ramón Molina
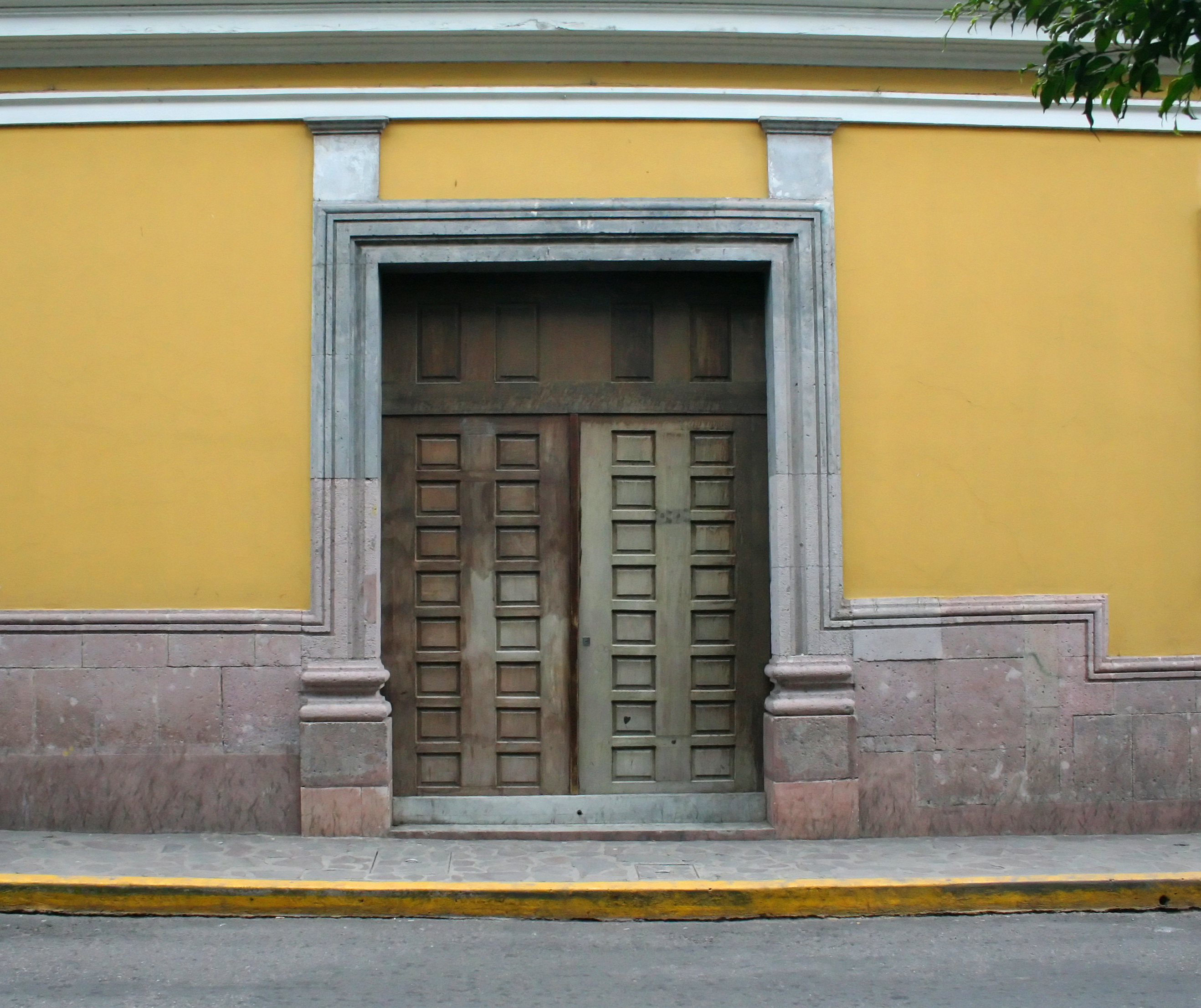
- The Juan Ramón Molina National Library
- 14.104875°N 87.203069°W
- Location: Tegucigalpa, Honduras
- Type: national library
- Established: 1880

The Juan Ramón Molina National Library (in Spanish Biblioteca Nacional Juan Ramón Molina) is the national library of Honduras, containing more than 40,000 volumes. It was founded by Antonio R. Vallejo, with the support of the president, Marco Aurelio Soto and secretary general, Ramón Rosa. The library was established August 27, 1880, during the administration of Marco Aurelio Soto through an agreement on February 11, with a budget of one thousand pesos. It was renamed after the poet Juan Ramón Molina in 2009.

The Biblioteca Nacional de Honduras is a public institution governed by the Secretary of Culture, Artribunas and Sports. Its mission is to compile, catalog, classify, conserve and spread all published documents in the country as well as foreign publications.
