= Carlos Zúñiga Figueroa =

Honduran painter (1885–1964)

- Born: June 5, 1885; Tegucigalpa, Honduras
- Died: 1964
- Occupation: Artist

Carlos Zúñiga Figueroa (5 June 1885 – 1964) was a Honduran painter.

== Biography ==
Figueroa was born in Tegucigalpa, Honduras on June 5, 1885. He was the son of Manuel José Figueroa and Vicenta Zuñiga. He undertook an apprenticeship in typography and graphic arts at the National Typography of Tegucigalpa, later studying photography. He gained a scholarship to study Art at the Royal Academy of Saint Fernando in Madrid. In 1913, he married Genoveva Vásquez, with whom he had 5 children. He died in 1964 in Honduras.

== Artistic life ==
1913, he became a technician at the National Typography of Tegucigalpa, the same institution where he undertook his apprenticeship. In later years, he was appointed Director of the "Type-National Lithography", a position he held for seven years. The National Academy of Drawing was opened under his direction in 1934. In 1940, he became a teacher at the newly inaugurated National School of Fine Arts.

In 1951 he participated, by invitation of the Embassy of Spain, in the First Biennial Iberoamericana of Art at the Institute of Hispanic Culture in Madrid.

== Memberships ==
- Founding member of the "Honduran Casino".
- Artistic Director of the Athenaeum of Honduras.
- Member of the Honduran Masonic Lodge.

== Recognitions ==
- Gold medal, Exhibition of Art in Tegucigalpa, Honduras.
- Silver medal, Worldwide Fair of New York, United States of America.
- Medal of Honour, Exhibition of Art in San Francisco, California, United States of America.
- "Anthology of the Plastic Arts of Honduras" by the Cultural Centre of Spain in Tegucigalpa 2003.

== Works ==
- "Glorification of the General José Francisco Morazán Quezada".
- "Casería Of the General Morazán and the General Villaseñor" in San José, Costa Rica.
- "Portrait of the Doctor and General gift Tiburcio Carias Andean"
- "Painting of the National Theatre Manuel Bonilla

== See also ==
- Culture of Honduras
- Art in Honduras
