= Ojojona =

- Municipality
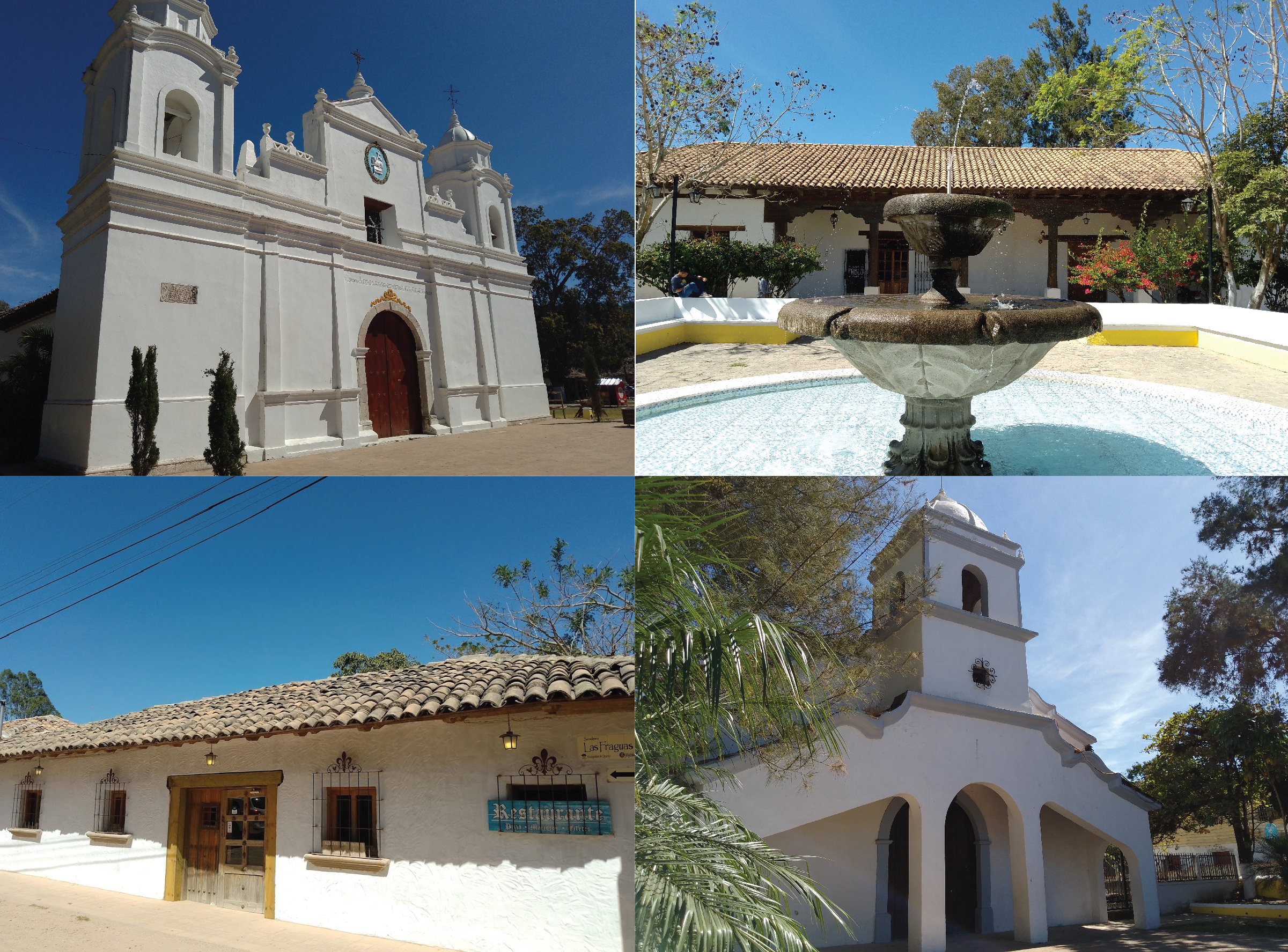

- Seal

- Location in Honduras
- Coordinates: 13°56′N 87°18′W
- Country: Honduras
- Department: Francisco Morazán
- Founded: 1579

Area
  - Total: 260 km^{2} (100 sq mi)

Population (2015)
  - Total: 10,729
  - Density: 41/km^{2} (110/sq mi)
- Climate: Cwb

Ojojona is a municipality in the Honduran department of Francisco Morazán, located 34 km south of Tegucigalpa. The town is one of the many touristic places of near the capital of Honduras, Tegucigalpa. It is also the place of birth of notable natives include the painter Pablo Zelaya Sierra.

== Location ==
The municipality has borders at north with the Central District, at south with the municipality of Reitoca and Sabanagrande, at the east with the municipalities of Santa Ana and Sabanagrande and at west with the municipalities of Reitoca and Lepaterique. It is situated in a small plateau in one of the hills of Cerro de Hule, at the base of the Payaguagre mountain.

== History ==
Before the Spanish colonization the place where the town is now located was inhabited by Lenca indigenous people. In 1579, it was founded by Spanish miners dedicated to the work of the gold and silver mines in the area. By1739 land titles of the Pueblo of Ojojona already appear. In 1791, in the population count of 1791, it appears as head of parish. In 1889, in the Territorial Political Division of 1889, it was a municipality of the District of Sabanagrande. The Historic Center of the municipal seat of San Juan de Ojojona was declared a National Monument by the National Congress of the Republic, through Decree No. 155-96, published in the Official Gazette in November 1996.

== Tourism ==
Guazulán mine entrances

They were exploited by Spanish and Irish. Historically, it has been said that the architect Ladislao Valladares designed the first sketch of our National Coat of Arms and that he included the Guazulán mine entrances, however, arguments to support this theory have not yet been obtained.

Chilate RanchIt is a small hamlet where the tradition of country lunch, chilate and donuts in honey is maintained. Guancaso activities are held here between Ojojona and Lepaterique with a lunada and picnic lunch.

House Pablo Zelaya Sierra

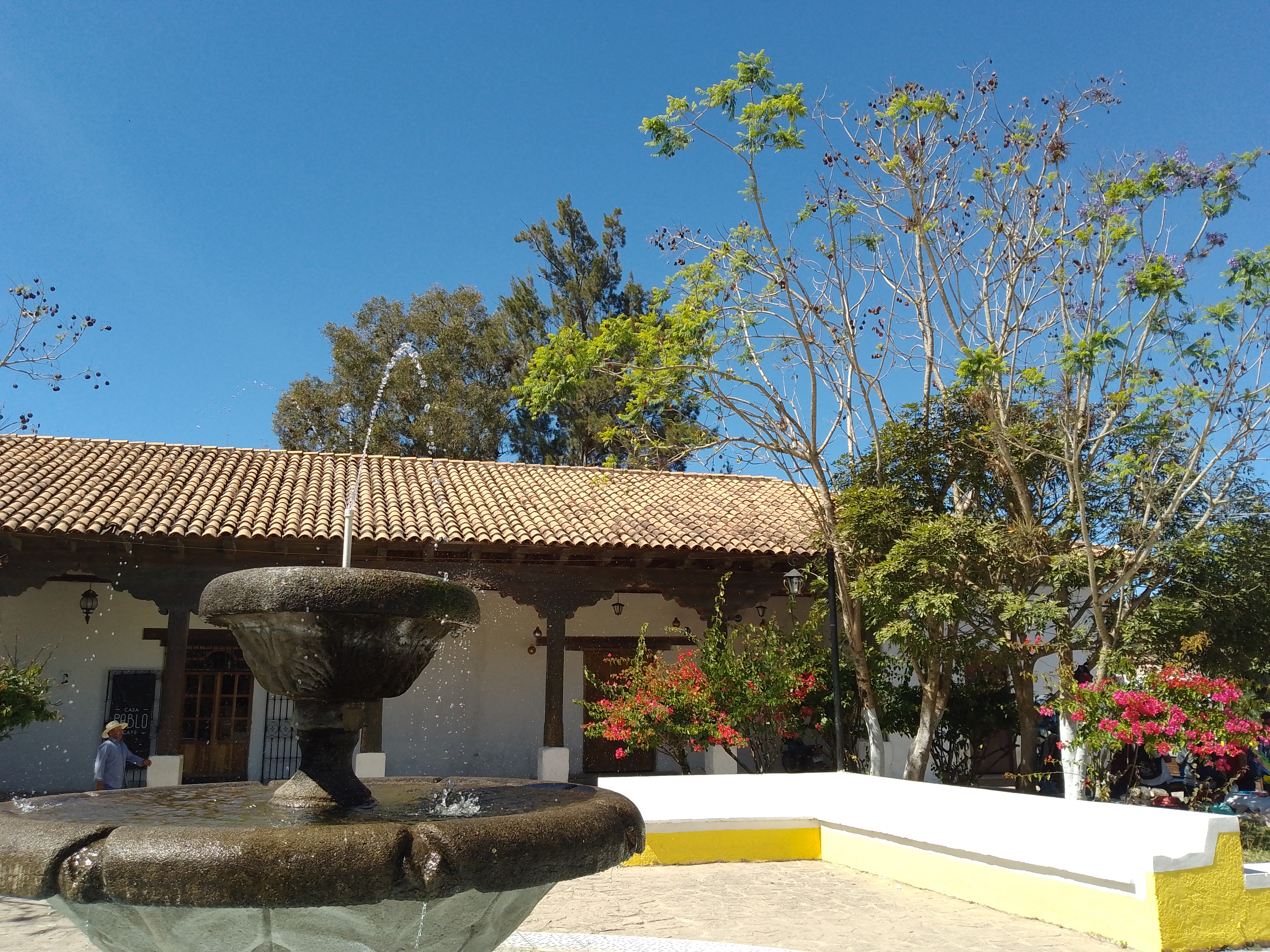
Pablo Zelaya House in the main Plaza.

A museum functioned in this place from the 1980s until the beginning of the 21st century, but in 2001 a fire consumed the building. In 2007 it was restored following good architectural criteria. Currently, the private part of the house is used as a café and cultural center; In the other, the Workshop School promoted by Coneanfo currently operates.

Villa Trinidad

House where General Francisco Morazán was captured in 1827. Currently you can visit and learn about the history of this place in detail and enjoy Luna Lenca restaurant-café: traditional food and coffee harvested in the mountains of Ojojona.

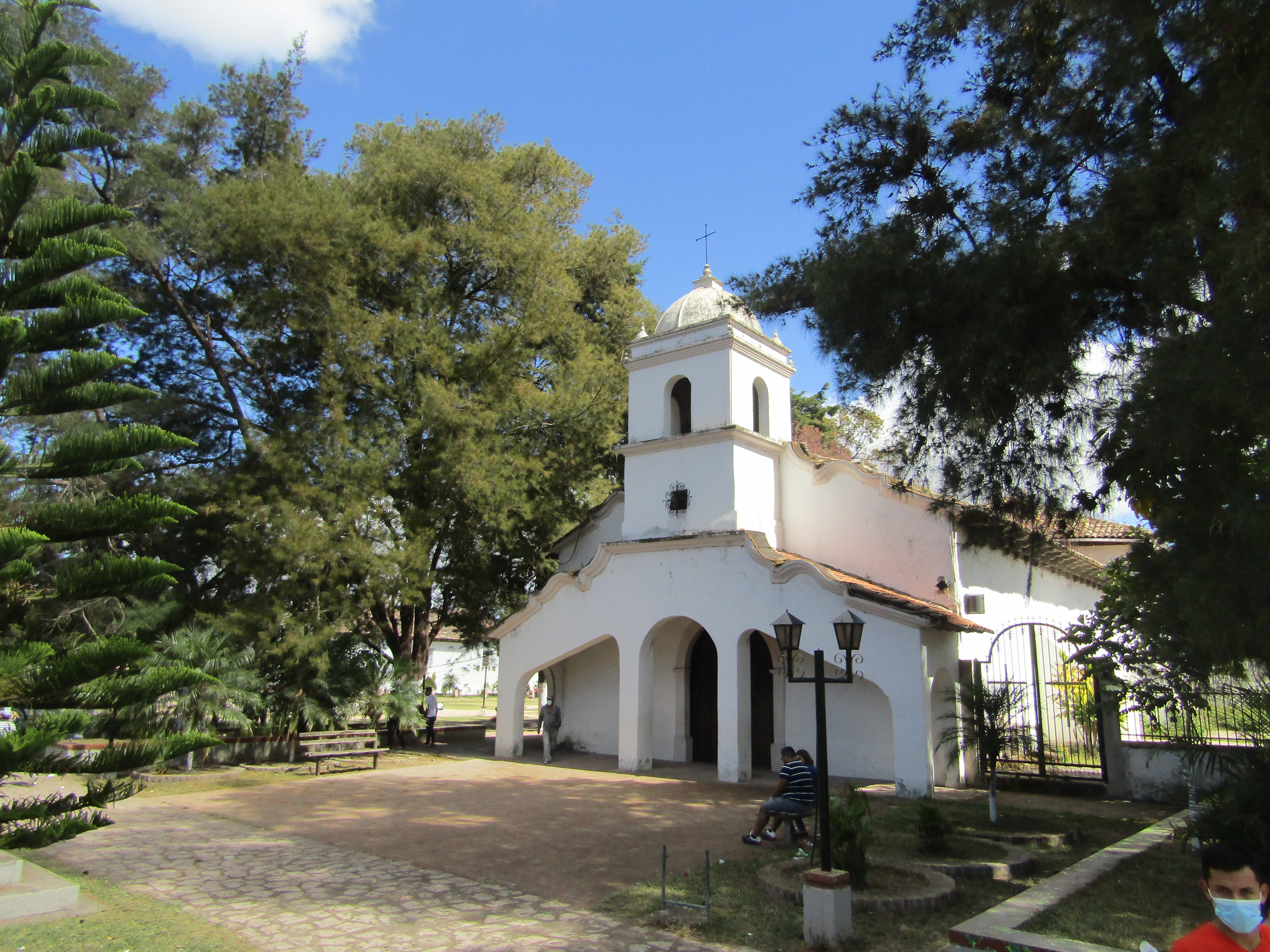
Church of Nuestra señora del Carmen.

Heritage propertiesIn the Historic Center of Ojojona there are 36 heritage buildings dating from the 17th century. Among them we can mention the Town Hall, the Casa Cural, the Casona de Pancha Martínez, the Iglesia Nuestra Señora del Carmen, the Iglesia San Juan Bautista whose construction began in the second half of 160, Villa Trinidad, etc.

== Villages ==
The municipality has 12 recognized villages:

- Ojojona (the main village)
- El Aguacatal
- El Círculo
- Aragua
- El Jícaro
- Guasucarán
- Güerisne
- Santa Cruz
- Saracarán
- Surcos de Caña
- Cofradía de Jícaro
- Cofradía de Güerisne
