= Cedros, Honduras =

Cedros
- Municipality
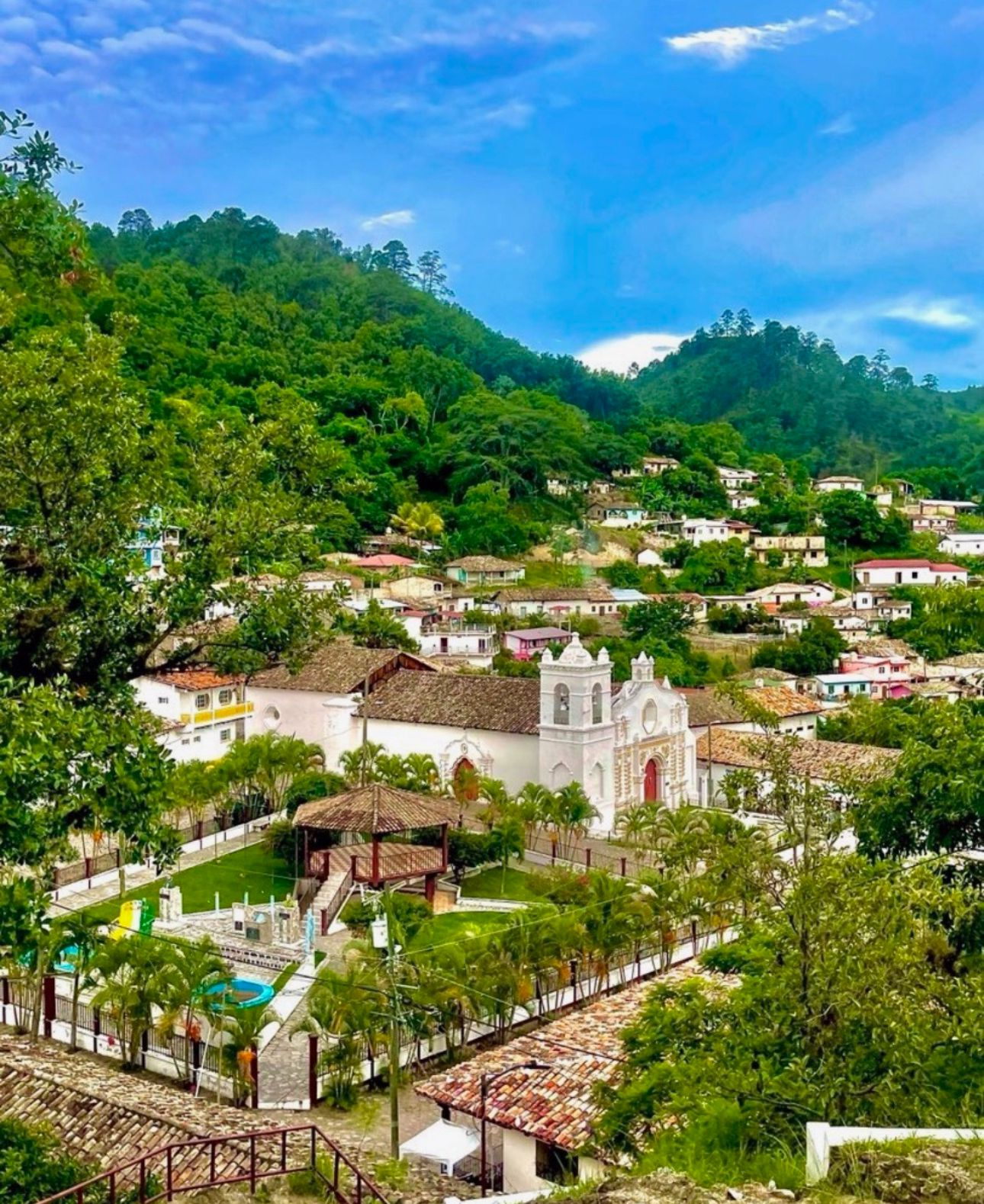

- Location in Honduras
- Coordinates: 14°36′N 87°7′W
- Country: Honduras
- Department: Francisco Morazán

Area
  - Total: 750 km^{2} (290 sq mi)

Population (2015)
  - Total: 25,102
  - Density: 33/km^{2} (87/sq mi)

Cedros (Spanish pronunciation: [ˈseðɾos]) is a municipality in the Honduran department of Francisco Morazán.

It is located 77 kilometers (paved road) from Tegucigalpa in an area of rolling hills with tropical pine forests.
