= Francisco Morazán Department =

Francisco Morazán Department Departamento de Francisco Morazán
- Department
- Flag

- Location of Francisco Morazán in Honduras
- Coordinates: 14°6′N 87°13′W
- Country: Honduras
- Municipalities: 28
- Villages: 274
- Established: 28 June 1825 (Note: The department of Tegucigalpa (renamed Francisco Morazán in 1943) was one of the first 7 departments in which the national territory was divided in the first political division of Honduras in 1825.)
- Named for: Francisco Morazán
- Capital city: Tegucigalpa

Government
  - Type: Departmental
  - Governor: Carlos Eduardo Reina (since 2024) ( LIBRE)

Area
  - Total: 8,580 km^{2} (3,310 sq mi)

Population (2015)
  - Total: 1,553,379
  - Rank: 2nd in Honduras
  - Density: 181/km^{2} (469/sq mi)

GDP (Nominal, 2015 US dollar)
  - Total: $5.6 billion (2023)
  - Per capita: $2,900 (2023)

GDP (PPP, constant 2015 values)
  - Total: $11.7 billion (2023)
  - Per capita: $6,100 (2023)
- Time zone: UTC-6 (CDT)
- Postal code: 11101, 12101
- ISO 3166 code: HN-FM
- HDI (2021): 0.677 medium · 1st
- Statistics derived from Consult INE online database: Population and Housing Census 2013

Francisco Morazán (Spanish pronunciation: [fɾanˈsisko moɾaˈsan], abbreviated FMO) is one of the departments of Honduras.

It is located in the central part of the nation. The departmental capital is Tegucigalpa, which is also Honduras's national capital.

The department is very mountainous, with rugged ranges covered in pine forests; which are rocky and mostly clay. Valleys, like those of Guaimaca, Talanga, and Amarateca, are interspersed among the ranges. Many of the high mountain peaks house cloud forests, like La Tigra National park or Cerro Uyuca. The extreme southeastern portion of the department has a Pacific dry forest environment, while the northern portion contains the Montaña de la Flor, home to the Jicaque people.

Francisco Morazán department covers a total surface area of 7,946 km^{2} (3,068 sq mi) and, in 2005, had an estimated population of 1,680,700 people.

The coat-of-arms and departmental flag of Francisco Morazán Department are the same as its capital, Tegucigalpa.

== History ==
=== Precolumbian Times ===
In pre-Columbian times the department was inhabited mainly by Lenca Indians in the center and south and Tolupan in the north. Archaeological sites demonstrate that they were inhabited by an organized society since approximately the pre-Classic Mesoamerican period. Las Terrazas Ruins as well as the Ayasta caves are examples of organized human presence before European colonization.

=== Colonial era and independence ===
The territory began to be colonized by the Spanish in the 16th century and the towns of San Miguel de Tegucigalpa, Santa Lucia, and Ojojona were founded as mining hubs. Over time, the territory of what is now Francisco Morazán was part of the Province of Tegucigalpa. The name of the department honors Francisco Morazán, one of the most important heroes in the history of Central America, who was a political and military leader during the time of the Central American Federation in the 19th century

=== 20th century ===
Until April 16, 1943, it was known as Tegucigalpa department. It was renamed after national hero Francisco Morazán.

== Municipalities ==
1. Alubarén
2. Cedros
3. Curarén
4. Distrito Central (cap. Tegucigalpa)
5. El Porvenir
6. Guaimaca
7. La Libertad
8. La Venta
9. Lepaterique
10. Maraita
11. Marale
12. Nueva Armenia
13. Ojojona
14. Orica
15. Reitoca
16. Sabanagrande
17. San Antonio de Oriente
18. San Buenaventura
19. San Ignacio
20. San Miguelito
21. Santa Ana
22. Santa Lucía
23. Talanga
24. Tatumbla
25. Valle de Ángeles
26. Vallecillo
27. Villa de San Francisco
28. Zambrano

== See also ==
- Arnoldo José Avilés García
