= San Antonio de Oriente =

- Municipality
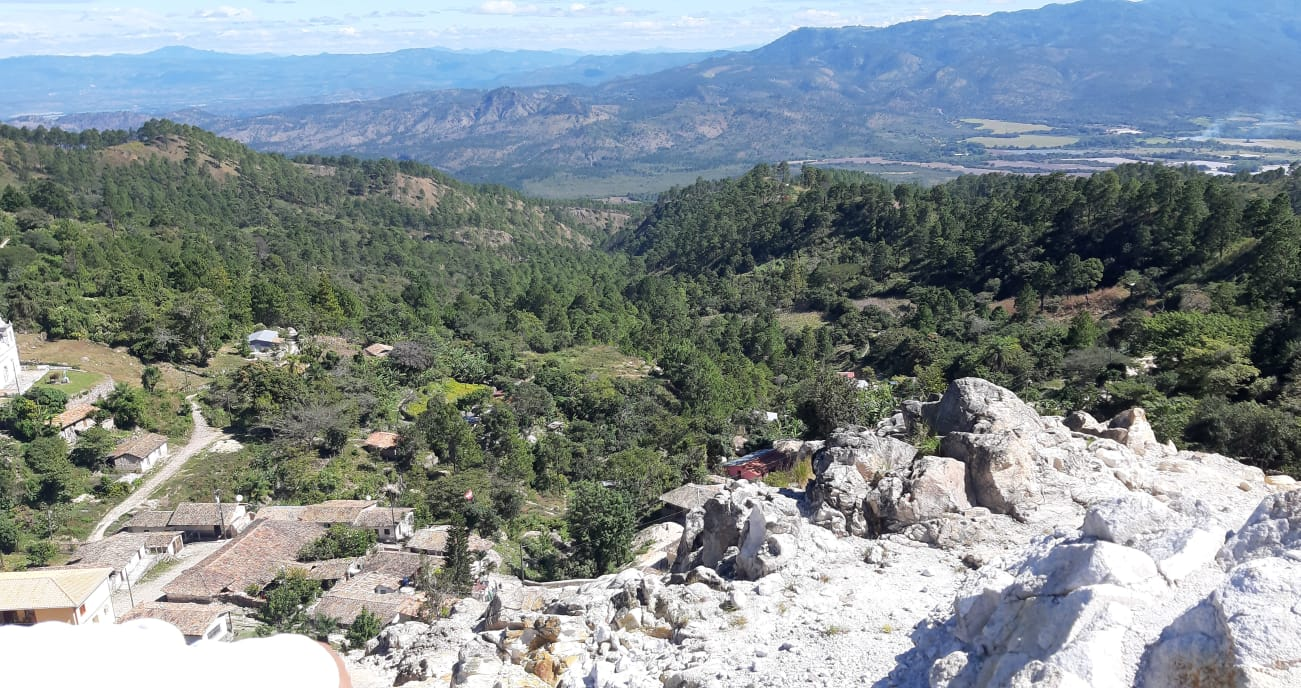

- Location in Honduras
- Coordinates: 14°2′N 87°3′W
- Country: Honduras
- Department: Francisco Morazán
- Founded: 1660

Area
  - Total: 227 km^{2} (88 sq mi)
- Elevation: 1,173 m (3,848 ft)

Population (2015)
  - Total: 15,299
  - Density: 67.4/km^{2} (175/sq mi)

San Antonio de Oriente is a municipality in the Honduran department of Francisco Morazán.

Population as of 2015 is 15,299. The first occupants came in 1660 in the village Mineral de San Antonio that is 4 km away from the present town. Nowadays it is called San Antonio Yusguare. A kilometre west of San Antonio de Oriente lies San Antonio Ocidente. San Antonio de Oriente lies 28 km from Tegucigalpa, high in the mountains. The Santa Iné River crosses the municipality in a south to north direction. There is a school and a health centre. Many youngsters from the village have left to go to Tegucigalpa to study.

== Notable people ==
Florencio Xatruch (1811 - 1893) a General who led the Honduran expeditionary force against William Walker in Nicaragua in 1856 was born in the town.
