= BVG Class J =

Electric multiple unit train

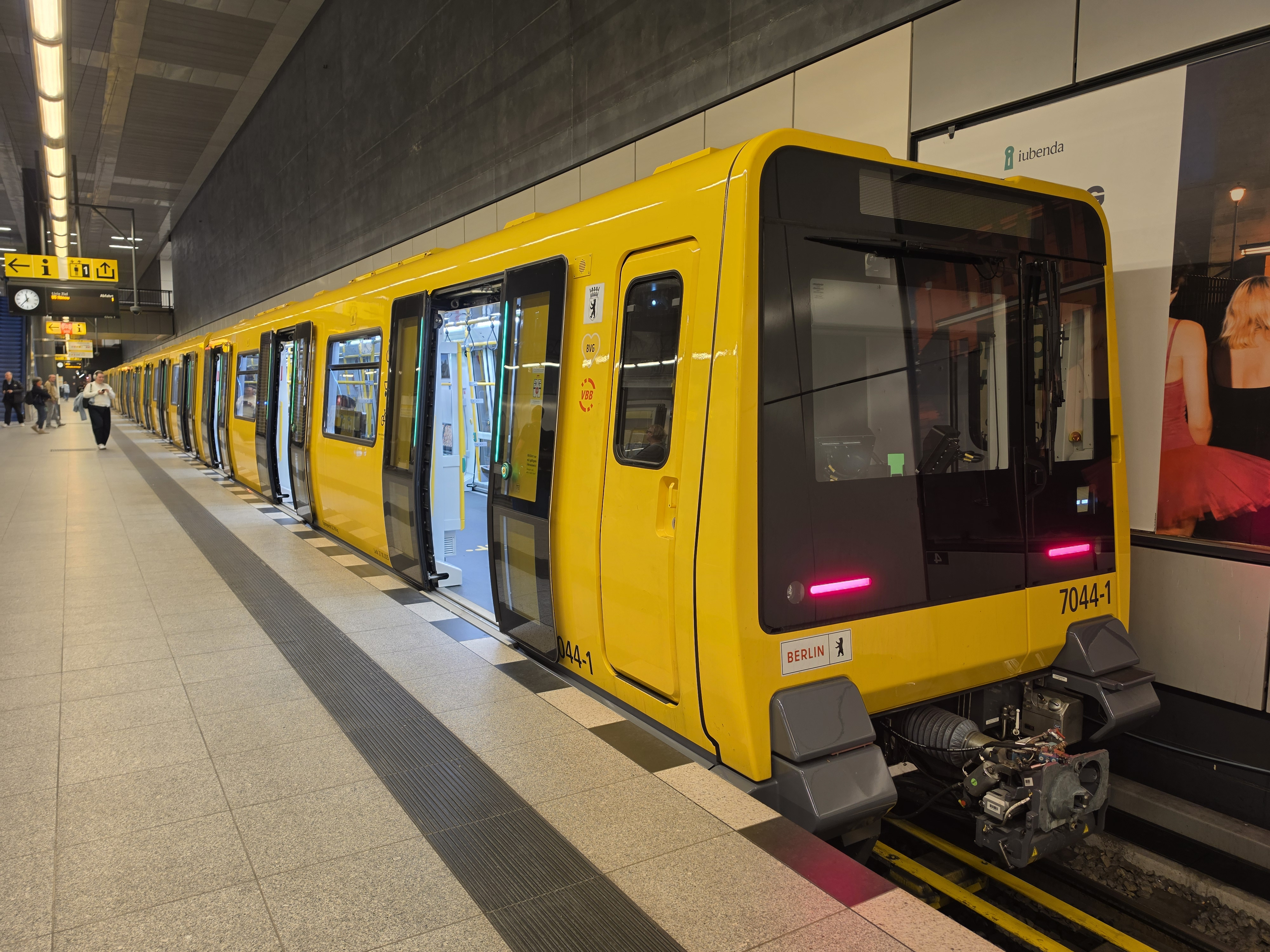
- BVG Class J on U5 at Berlin Hauptbahnhof

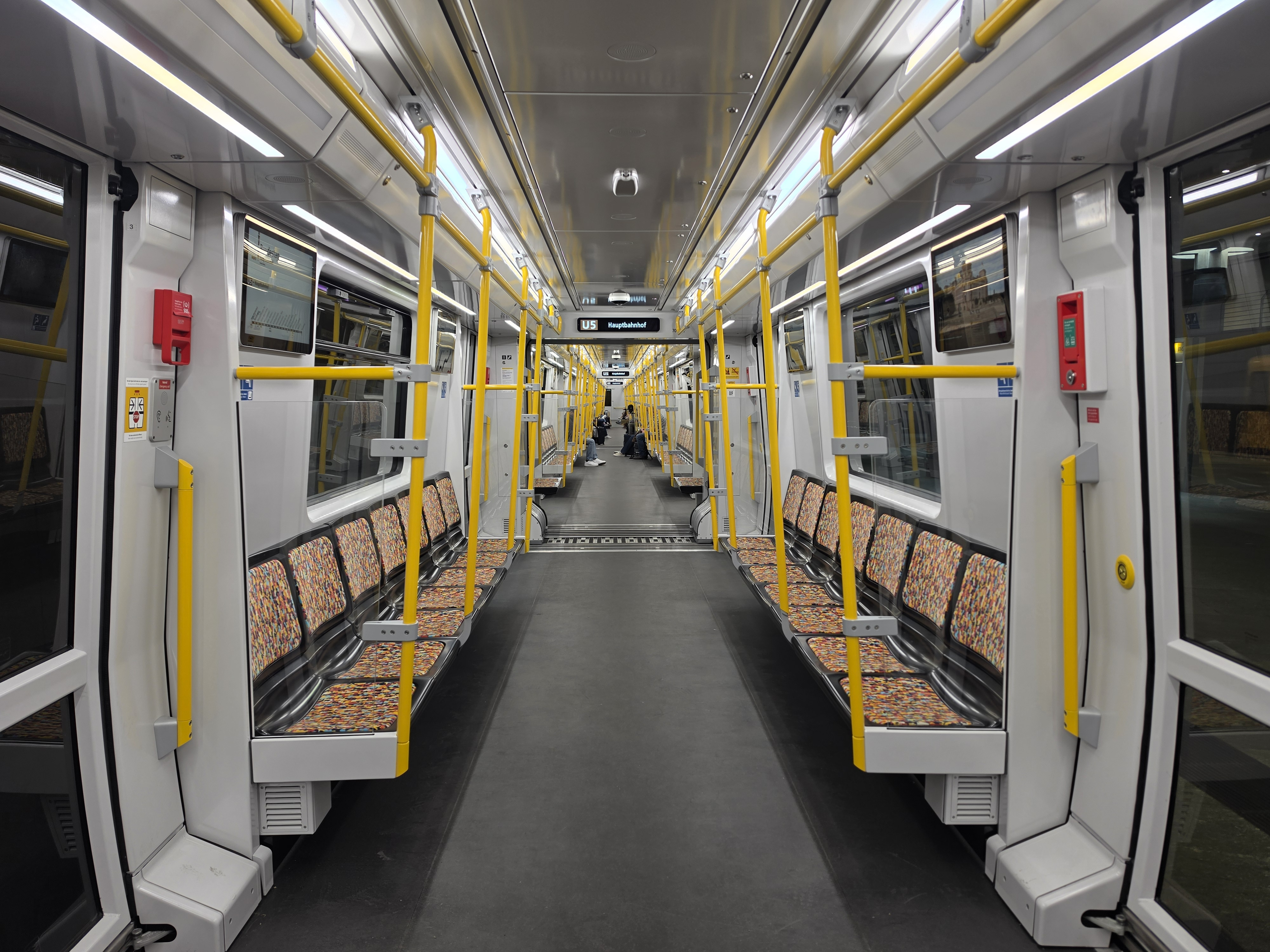
- The interior of a Class J train
- Stock type: Electric multiple unit
- In service: 2026–present
- Manufacturer: Stadler Rail
- Built at: Pankow
- Family name: METRO
- Replaced: F
- Constructed: 2023–
- Entered service: 30 April 2026
- Formation: 2-car: DM–DM; 4-car: DM–M–M–DM
- Fleet numbers: 7001–
- Capacity: 2-car: 38 seats, 177 standing; 4-car: 110 seats, 353 standing
- Operator: Berliner Verkehrsbetriebe

Specifications
- Car body construction: Aluminium
- Train length: 2-car: 32.1 m (105 ft 3 3/4 in); 4-car: 64.2 m (210 ft 7 9/16 in)
- Car length: 16.05 m (52 ft 7 7/8 in)
- Width: 2.65 m (8 ft 8 5/16 in)
- Height: 3,425 mm (11 ft 2 13/16 in)
- Floor height: 950 mm (37 3/8 in)
- Entry: level
- Doors: Sliding plug, 3 per side
- Maximum speed: 70 km/h (43 mph)
- Traction system: ABB BORDLINE CC750 DC 750V U 800 119A01 2-level IGBT–VVVF
- Traction motors: 6–12 × TSA TMR 39A-18-4 100 kW (134 hp) asynchronous 3-phase AC
- Power output: 2-car: 600 kW (805 hp); 4-car: 1,200 kW (1,609 hp)
- Electric systems: 750 V DC (nominal) from third rail
- Current collection: Contact shoe
- UIC classification: (1A)Bo′(+Bo′(A1)+(1A)Bo′)+Bo′(A1)
- Braking systems: Regenerative, rheostatic, electro-pneumatic
- Coupling system: Scharfenberg
- Track gauge: 1,435 mm (4 ft 8 1/2 in) standard gauge

The BVG Class J is a type of electric multiple unit train designed for the Berlin U-Bahn. They are the first new class of large profile trains introduced to the network since the Class H in the mid-1990s. The first trains of the class commenced passenger service in 2026.

== History ==
By the mid-2010s, Berlin's fleet of large profile U-Bahn trains averaged 26 years old. Although an upgrade programme was underway on some Class F trains, refurbishment of later trains in that class was cancelled due to the discovery of cracks in the vehicle bodies. This forced BVG to order additional small profile Class IK trains which could be delivered on a shorter timescale, but would not make full use of the larger loading gauge of the large profile lines. The Class J trains will therefore allow not just the retirement of decades-old stock, but also the transfer of small profile trains to the lines for which they were designed.

The contract for the vehicles was put out to tender in October 2016, and was won by Stadler Rail in May 2019. The award of the contract was disputed by Alstom, but their appeals were turned down, and the contract finally awarded in March 2020. The trains will be built at Stadler's Pankow factory in Berlin.

After several delays, the first train entered passenger service on 30 April 2026. Stadler will supply 344 vehicles over the course of the contract.

== Features ==
The trains will be delivered with either 2 or 4 cars each, allowing them to be coupled together to form 6- or 8-car trains. Many spare parts are interchangeable with the related small profile Class JK trains, in an effort to simplify maintenance and servicing. The aluminium vehicle bodies will feature 3 doors per side, and both interior and exterior passenger information system (PIS) displays. The vehicles only have two windows per side, with the majority of the interior PIS displays attached to the walls either side of them. A 2-car train can seat 38 passengers with an additional 177 standing, while 4-car units have 110 seats with space for 353 standing passengers.
