= Metro =

Metro most often refers to:

- Metropolitan area, the populated region including and surrounding an urban center
- Rapid transit, a passenger railway in an urban area with high capacity and frequency

Metro may also refer to:

== Places ==
- Metro City (Indonesia), a city in Indonesia
- MetroWest, an area in Massachusetts
- MetroWest (Orlando), an area in Orlando, Florida
- Detroit Metropolitan Airport, in Michigan, US

== Public transport ==
=== Public transport terms ===
- Rapid transit, a passenger railway in an urban area with high capacity and frequency
- The public transport operator of city or metropolitan area
- The transportation authority of city or metropolitan area
- The urban rail transit system of a city or metropolitan area

=== Bus services and transit authorities ===
==== Asia ====
- MetroMini, in Jakarta, Indonesia
- Lahore Metrobus, in Pakistan

==== Europe ====
- Metro (Belfast), in Northern Ireland, UK
- Metro (Liverpool City Region), in England, UK
- West Yorkshire Metro (or MetroTrain), in England, UK

==== North America ====
===== United States =====
- Greater Portland Metro Bus, in Maine
- King County Metro, in Seattle, Washington
- Los Angeles County Metropolitan Transportation Authority (branded as "Metro"), in California
- Metro (Cincinnati), in Ohio
- Houston Metro, in Houston, Texas
- Mountain Metropolitan Transit, in Colorado Springs, Colorado
- Metrobus (Washington, D.C.), in the Washington Metro Area

==== Oceania ====
- Brisbane Metro, in Australia
- Metro Tasmania, in Australia

==== In multiple places ====
- Metro Transit (disambiguation)
- Metrobus (disambiguation)

== Businesses and organizations ==
- Metro Bank (United Kingdom), a high street bank in the UK
- Metro (department store), a chain based in Indonesia
- Metro (supermarket, Greece)
- Metro (supermarket, Indonesia), a real estate and property management company
- Metro AG, a retailer in Germany
- MetroCentre (shopping centre), indoor shopping mall, Gateshead, England, UK
- Metro Cash and Carry, a hypermarket chain owned by Metro AG
- METRO Foods Trading, Cyprus
- Metro Inc., a Canadian supermarket chain
- Metro International Airways, a former American charter and passenger airline, now part of Flying Tiger Lines
- Metro (restaurant chain), an Icelandic fast food chain
- Metropolitan New York Library Council (METRO), a non-profit organization
- Metro by T-Mobile, a prepaid wireless service provider in the US
- Metro Retail Stores Group, a retail company based in Mandaue, Philippines
- Detroit Metropolitan Airport, in Michigan, US

== Media and entertainment ==
=== Books ===
- Metro (novel), 1933, by Vladimir Varankin
- Metro 2033 (novel) (2005)
- Metro 2034 (2009)
- Metro 2035 (2015)

=== Broadcasting ===
- Metro Broadcast Corporation, with a variety of Hong Kong–based Metro‑branded radio stations
- Metro Channel, a pay TV channel in the Philippines
- Metro FM, a national radio station, South Africa
- Metro Radio, former name for a radio station, Newcastle upon Tyne, North East England, now called Hits Radio North East
- Metro TV (disambiguation), several television stations
- Metro 14, on air name of CJNT-DT, a television station, Montreal, Quebec
- Radio Metro, a radio station, Argentina
- Metro (Poland), a Polish television channel
- Metrovision, a defunct Malaysian television channel
- Radio Metrowave, a defunct Bangladeshi radio station
- Telemetro, a Panamanian television channel
- DD Metro, a defunct Indian television channel
- NRK Metro, a defunct Norwegian radio station

=== Film ===
- Metro (1997 film), starring Eddie Murphy
- Metro (2007 film), an Indian Hindi-language by Anurag Basu
  - Metro (2024 film), its sequel by Basu
- Metro (2013 film), Russian film
- Metro (2016 film), an Indian Tamil-language film
- The Metro (film), an Indian 2011 Malayalam-language film
- Metro Pictures, one of Metro-Goldwyn-Mayer's predecessor companies

=== Media companies ===
- Metro International, a Swedish media company
- Metro Newspapers, a newspaper company in California

=== Music ===
==== Artists ====
- Metro (Hungarian band)
- Metro (British band), active 1976–1980
- Metro (Serbian band), active 1981–1985; 1994–1997
- Metrô (band), Brazilian new wave band active 1978–1988; 2002–2004; 2014; since 2015
- Metro Boomin (born 1993), American songwriter, known simply as Metro
- The Metros, an English indie band active 2006–2009

==== Titled works ====
- Metro (album), 1977 self-titled album by the British band
- Metro (musical), a 1991 Polish musical
- "The Metro" (song), a 1983 single by Berlin
- "Metro", a 2006 song by The Vincent Black Shadow
- "Metro", a song by Tokyo Jihen from the 2007 album Variety

==== Venues ====
- Metro Chicago, a music venue, Chicago, US
- Metro Theatre, Sydney, a music venue, Sydney, Australia
- Metro Nightclub, the former name of the Palace theatre, Melbourne, Australia

=== Periodicals ===
==== Magazines ====
- Metro (magazine), New Zealand lifestyle magazine
- Metro Magazine, for bus and rail transit and motorcoach operators
- Metro Weekly, a free weekly magazine-style publication for the LGBT community of Washington, D.C.

==== Newspapers ====
- Harian Metro, Malaysia
- Metro (Belgian newspaper)
- Metro (British newspaper)
- Metro (Dutch newspaper)
- Metro (Italian newspaper)
- Metro (Swedish newspaper)
- Métro (Montreal newspaper), a French-language free newspaper
- Metro (Philadelphia newspaper)
- Metro New York (2004–2020), merged with AM New York, renamed AM New York Metro
- AM New York Metro (2003, as AM New York), merged with Metro New York
- Metro Daily, Hong Kong newspaper
- Metro Santa Cruz, former name of a newspaper in Santa Cruz, California, renamed the Santa Cruz Weekly
- Metro Silicon Valley, in San Jose, California
- StarMetro (newspaper), a chain of Canadian free newspapers (formerly called Metro until April 2018)
- Zimbabwe Metro

=== Video games ===
- Metro 2033 (video game) (2010)
- Metro: Last Light (2013)
- Metro Exodus (2019)

=== Other uses in media and entertainment ===
- Metro (board game), 2000
- Metro (franchise), a multimedia sci-fi franchise created by Russian author Dmitry Glukhovsky, including:
- Metro (typeface)

== Schools ==
- Metro Academic and Classical High School, St Louis, Missouri, US
- Metropolitan State University of Denver, Denver, Colorado, US
- Metropolitan State University, Minneapolis–Saint Paul, Minnesota, US

== Sports ==
- Metro (wrestler), a Mexican masked luchador
- Metro Conference (1975–1995), a defunct NCAA Division I athletic conference
- Metro FC (New Zealand), association football club based in Auckland
- Little League World Series (Metro Region), a Little League World Series US region

== Technology ==
- Metro (design language), developed by Microsoft for interfaces
- Eclipse Metro, an open source web service stack that is part of Eclipse Enterprise for Java (EE4J)
- Metro Ethernet, an Ethernet-based computer network that covers a metropolitan area
- Metro, former code name of the Open XML Paper Specification, Microsoft's document framework

== Vehicles ==
=== Automobiles ===
- Austin Metro, a British supermini hatchback, also called MG Metro
- Geo Metro or Chevrolet Metro, an American subcompact car, later called Chevrolet Metro
- International Metro Van, an American step van

=== Other vehicles ===
- Fairchild Metro, a commuter airliner
- Stadler METRO, rapid transit rolling stock manufactured by Stadler Rail since 2012

== Other uses ==
- El Metro 4, a Mexican high-ranking drug trafficker
- Gregorio Sauceda-Gamboa, Mexican drug lord nicknamed Metro 2
- Samuel Flores Borrego (1972–2011), Mexican drug lord nicknamed Metro 3
- Metro (Oregon regional government)
- Metro Vancouver Regional District

== See also ==
- Metropolitan (disambiguation)
- Metropolis (disambiguation)
- Metropol (disambiguation)
- Metrorail (disambiguation)
- Metro line (disambiguation)
- Metroliner (disambiguation)
- Metro City (disambiguation)
- Dmytro, a Ukrainian name of which "Metro" is a nickname
- Metro Police (disambiguation)
