= Metrobus =

Metrobus may refer to:

== Transport services ==
=== Bus Rapid Transit ===
- MetroBus (Bristol), a bus rapid transit system in Bristol, England, United Kingdom
- Metrobus (Buenos Aires), a bus rapid transit system in Buenos Aires, Argentina
- Metrobus (Istanbul), a bus rapid transit system in Istanbul, Turkey
- Metrobus (Lahore), a public rapid transit system in Lahore, Pakistan
- Metrobus (Tegucigalpa), a bus system under construction in Tegucigalpa, Honduras
- Mexico City Metrobús, a bus rapid transit system in Mexico City, Mexico
- Multan Metrobus, a public rapid transit system in Multan, Pakistan
- Rawalpindi-Islamabad Metrobus, a public rapid transit system in Rawalpindi-Islamabad, Pakistan
- Los Angeles Metro Busway, a bus rapid transit system in Los Angeles, United States
- Metronit, a bus rapid transit system in Haifa, Israel
- Transmilenio, a bus rapid transit system in Bogotá, Colombia

=== Conventional ===
- Los Angeles Metro Bus, the transit bus service of the Los Angeles County Metropolitan Transportation Authority in Los Angeles County, California, United States
- Metrobus (Miami), the bus network of Miami-Dade Transit in Miami, Florida, United States
- Metrobus (Montreal), express feeder routes to the Montreal métro in Montréal, Québec, Canada
- Métrobus (Quebec), express bus routes operated by the Réseau de transport de la Capitale in Quebec City, Canada
- Metrobus (Panama), the massive bus system in Panama City, Panama
- MetroBus (St. Louis), the bus system operated by the Bi-State Development Agency in St Louis, Missouri, United States
- Metrobus (Sydney), a high frequency bus network in Sydney, Australia
- Metrobus (Washington, D.C.), a bus service in Washington DC, United States, and immediate suburbs in Maryland and Virginia
- Metrobus (South East England) bus operator with routes in parts of Surrey, Kent, Sussex, and Greater London
- Metrobus Transit, a public transit system in St John's, Newfoundland, Canada
- MetroMini, a minibus system is part of the public transport system of Jakarta, Indonesia.
- CapMetro Bus, a public transit bus network in Austin, Texas, United States
- El Metropolitano, a public transit system in Lima, Perú
- Havana MetroBus, the principal bus network of Havana, Cuba
- Metro Tasmania a public bus service in Tasmania, Australia
- Metropolitan Transit Authority of Harris County, bus service in the Houston, Texas, United States

=== Ticket ===
- Metrobús (ticket), the Madrid Metro and bus ticket

== Organisations ==
- King County Metro, the public transit authority of King County, Washington, United States
- Metro Bus Corporation, a Seoul bus operator
- Metrobus (London) a bus operator in London, England, operated by London General
- Metrobus (Malaysia), a bus operator in the Klang Valley
- Metrobus (South East England) a bus operator in Surrey, Sussex and Kent in South East England
- MetroBus, trading name of the Metropolitan (Perth) Passenger Transport Trust from 1995 until 2003
- M-é-t-r-o-b-u-s, a bus and metro operator Tramway de Rouen in Rouen, France
- West Yorkshire Metro, passenger transport executive in West Yorkshire, England

== Other ==
- MAN Metrobus (de), a bus model manufactured by MAN and Krauss-Maffei (1959-1973), and under license as Ikarus MAN IK-5 by Ikarus Zemun (1972-1981), and Roman 112U by Autobuzul Bucharest (1974-1980)
- MCW Metrobus, a bus model manufactured by Metro Cammell Weymann in the 1970s and 1980s

== See also ==
- Metro (disambiguation)
