= List of metros =

List of metros may refer to:

- List of metropolitan areas
- List of metro systems

== See also ==
- Metro
