= Metrorail =

Metrorail or metro rail may refer to:

- Rapid transit, a frequent electric rail system commonly called a metro
- Metro Railway, Kolkata, owner and operator of Kolkata Metro, India
- Dhaka Metro Rail, MRT metro service serving Bangladesh's capital city of Dhaka
- Metrorail (South Africa), a commuter rail system operator in South Africa
  - Metrorail Eastern Cape, commuter rail lines serving Port Elizabeth and East London
  - Metrorail Gauteng, the commuter rail system in Gauteng province (including Johannesburg and Pretoria)
  - Metrorail KwaZulu-Natal, the commuter rail system in Durban
  - Metrorail Western Cape, the commuter rail system in Cape Town
- Los Angeles Metro Rail, the rapid transit and light rail system in Los Angeles, California, USA
- Washington Metro, the rapid transit system in Washington, D.C., USA
- Metrorail (Miami-Dade County), the rapid transit system in Miami-Dade County, primarily, Miami, Florida, USA
- METRORail, the light rail system in Houston, Texas, USA
- Valley Metro Rail, the light rail system in the Phoenix metropolitan area in Arizona, USA
- Buffalo Metro Rail, the light rail system in Buffalo, New York, USA
- CapMetro Rail, the commuter rail service in Austin, Texas, USA
- New MetroRail, transit improvements to Transperth Trains, the railway network of Perth, Western Australia, Australia
- Bahrain light rail network, future transit system in Manama, Bahrain

== See also ==
- Metro (disambiguation)
