= Glasgow Subway rolling stock =

Rolling stock used on the Glasgow subway

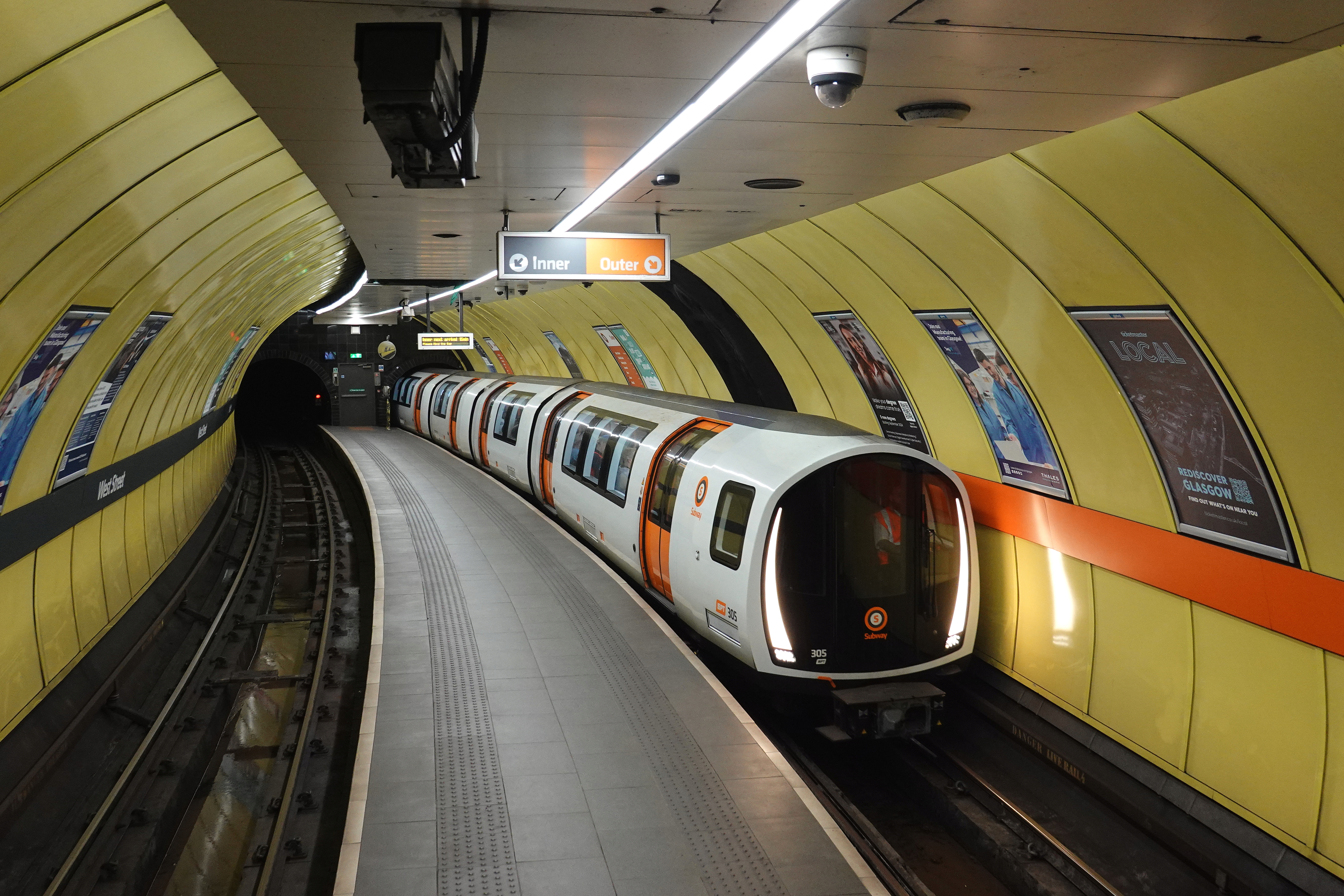
- A third-generation Glasgow Subway Stadler unit at West Street

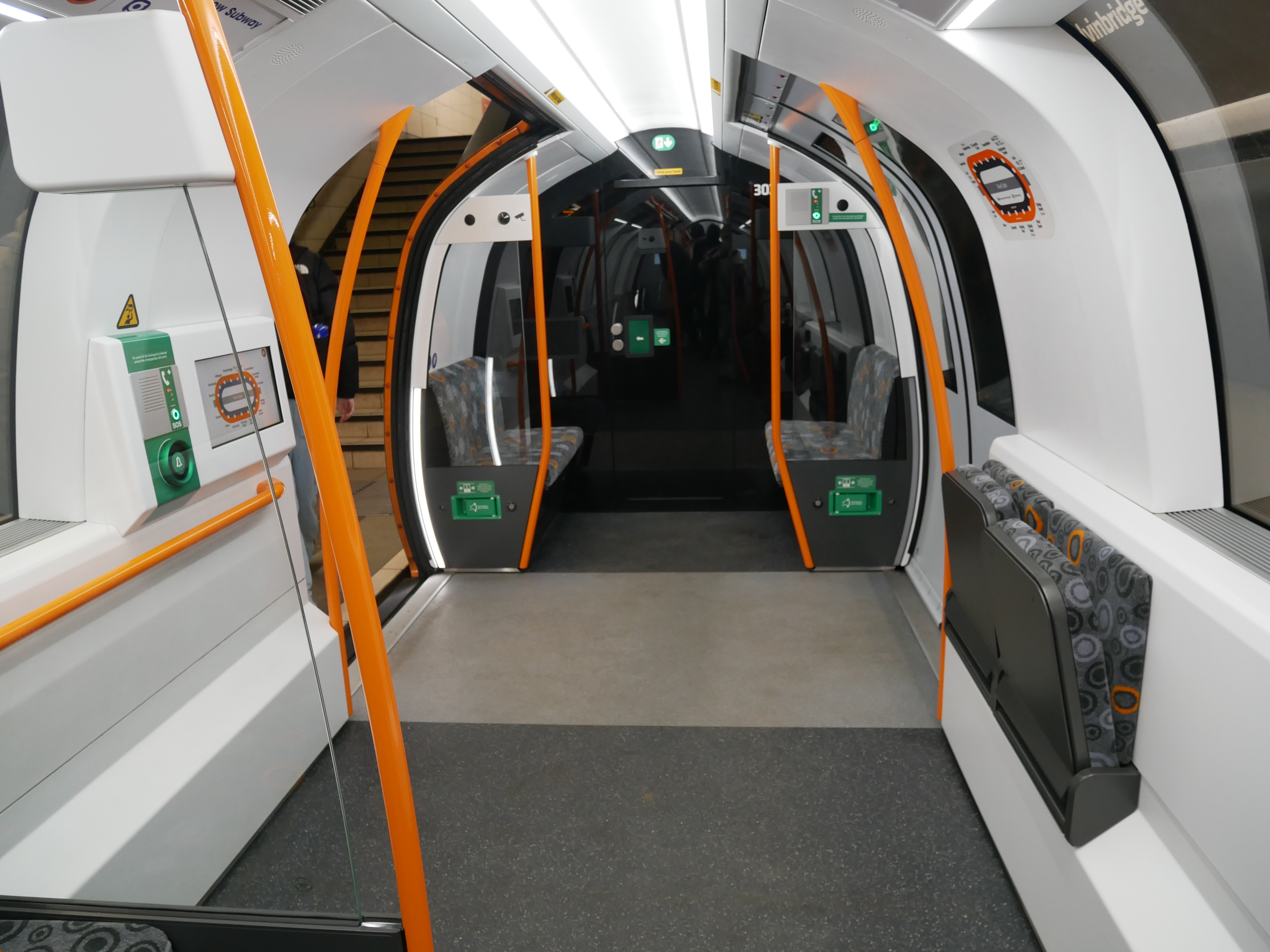
- Interior of third generation Glasgow Subway train
- In service: 11 December 2023–present
- Manufacturer: Stadler Rail
- Assembly: Stadler Altenrhein AG
- Built at: Altenrhein, Switzerland
- Family name: Stadler METRO
- Entered service: 2023–2024
- Number built: 17
- Number in service: 17
- Formation: 4-car sets
- Fleet numbers: 301–317
- Operator: Strathclyde Partnership for Transport
- Depot: Broomloan Depot
- Line served: Glasgow Subway

Specifications
- Car body construction: Extruded aluminium
- Train length: 39.51 m (129 ft 8 in)
- Width: 2,309 mm (7 ft 6.9 in)
- Height: 2,642 mm (8 ft 8.0 in)
- Floor height: 695 mm (2 ft 3 1/3 in)
- Doors: 12 per set (6 per side)
- Wheel diameter: 540–480 mm (1 ft 9 1/4 in – 1 ft 6 7/8 in) (new–worn)
- Wheelbase: 1,650 mm (5 ft 5 in)
- Maximum speed: 58 km/h (36 mph)
- Traction motors: 4 × TSA TMW 28-23-4 68 kW (91 hp) asynchronous 3-phase AC
- Power output: 272 kW (365 hp)
- Gearbox: TSA GMK 2-101-383A
- Gear ratio: 10.06:1 (2-stage reduction)
- Electric systems: Third rail, 600 V DC
- Current collection: Contact shoe
- UIC classification: Bo′Bo′+2′+2′+Bo′Bo′
- Coupling system: Scharfenberg
- Track gauge: 4 ft (1,219 mm) narrow gauge

The Glasgow Subway rolling stock serves the Glasgow Subway, the third-oldest underground metro system in the world. The Subway is currently on the third generation of rolling stock, which entered service on 11 December 2023. Unlike other Metro systems in the United Kingdom, the Subway has a running gauge of 1,220 mm (approximately 4 ft).

== Third generation (2023–present) ==
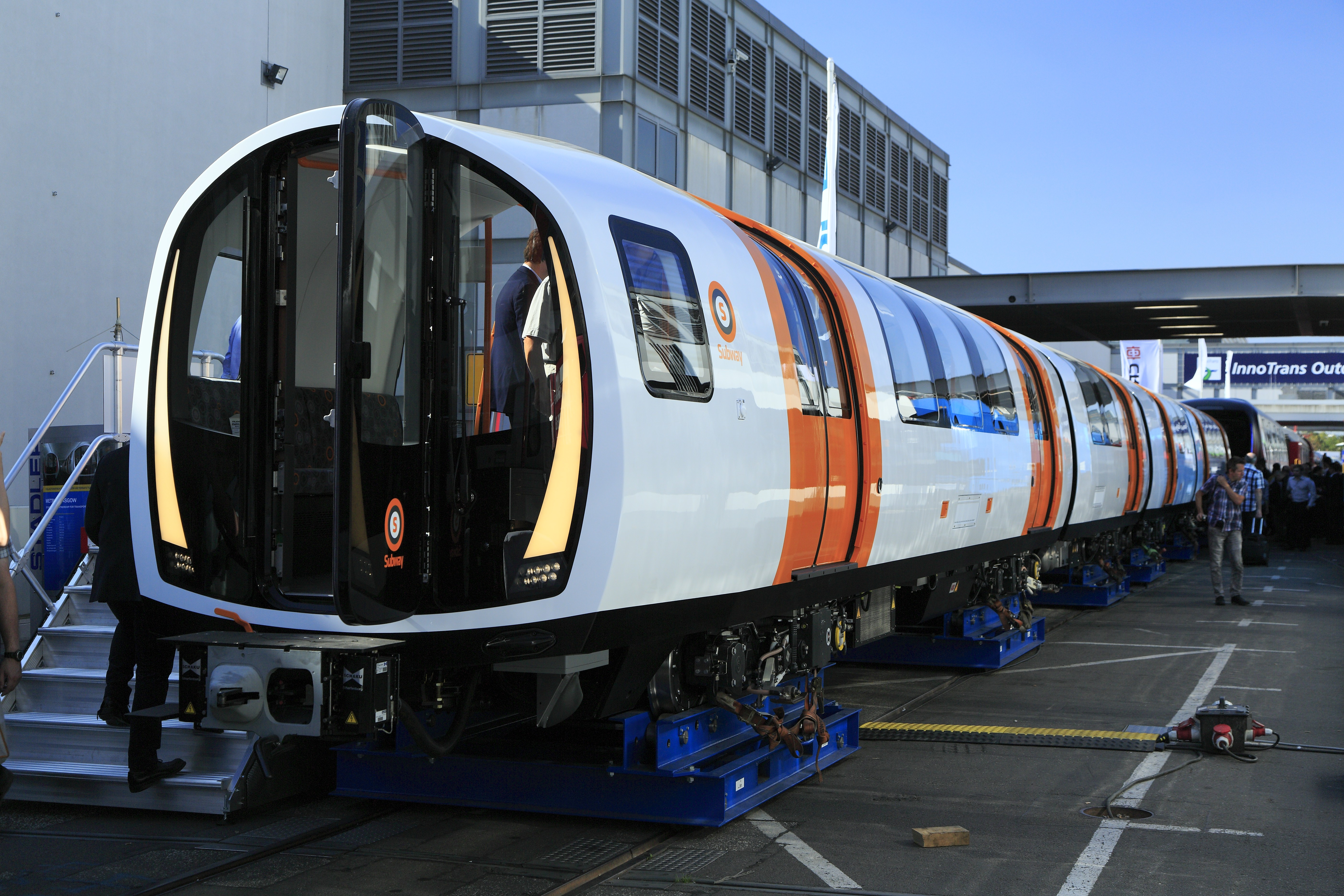
The new trains being displayed at the InnoTrans exhibition in 2018

Builders plate of the Generation 3 cars

Strathclyde Partnership for Transport (SPT) unveiled a £280 million contract with Stadler and Ansaldo STS in 2016 for modernisation of the Subway, including new rolling stock and signalling. Trains were initially expected to enter service in 2020.

Seventeen units were built by Stadler Rail at their factory in Altenrhein in eastern Switzerland. Trains feature the potential for driverless operation, an open-gangway design, space for wheelchairs, and compatibility with platform screen doors. The new trains are the same length and size as the second generation trains, but are made up of four carriages rather than the previous three.

The new trains were first shown to the public at InnoTrans in Berlin in September 2018. The first was delivered in May 2019. First testing on the subway took place on 5 December 2021, which involved a test run to Govan Station and recovery by a depot locomotive due to struggles to fit the rolling stock in the existing infrastructure. The trains entered service on 11 December 2023, initially running on weekday afternoons only. The trains entered full service in June 2024 previously running alongside the prior generation. The third generation are now the only rolling stock on the network since the withdrawal of the second generation on 28 June 2024.

As of 2026, work is underway to install new communications-based train control signalling and platform edge doors which will allow for fully automated and driverless operation in future.

== Second generation (1980–2024) ==
The first 33 cars of the next generation of rolling stock were built by Metro-Cammell in Washwood Heath between 1977 and 1979. Eight additional trailer cars were built in 1992. The rolling stock entered service when the subway re-opened after modernisation work on 16 April 1980. The original 33 were refurbished by ABB at Derby Litchurch Lane Works between 1993 and 1995.

=== Livery ===
Originally after the 1977–1980 modernisation the trains carried a light orange livery with a white stripe and stylised 'Trans-Clyde' branding. However, all the rolling stock were soon painted in a darker orange or 'Strathclyde red'., with a black window surround. This livery was also used on SPTE buses and on suburban and commuter trains operated by ScotRail within the Strathclyde region. Various minor adjustments to the livery were made, including new SPT branding. The trains were given a totally new livery in 2006 when they were painted 'Cream & Carmine'. However, in 2011, it was decided to return to an orange livery for the foreseeable future; this new orange design incorporates patches of white and grey to give the rolling stock a more modern look.

Some trains carried special liveries for advertising. These were normally found on the middle carriage of a train. These carriages were normally vinyl-wrapped in the design for the advert intended and were then temporarily used for the period of sponsorship, then these wraps could be easily removed and the subway carriage could return to its orange livery.

Second generation rolling stock
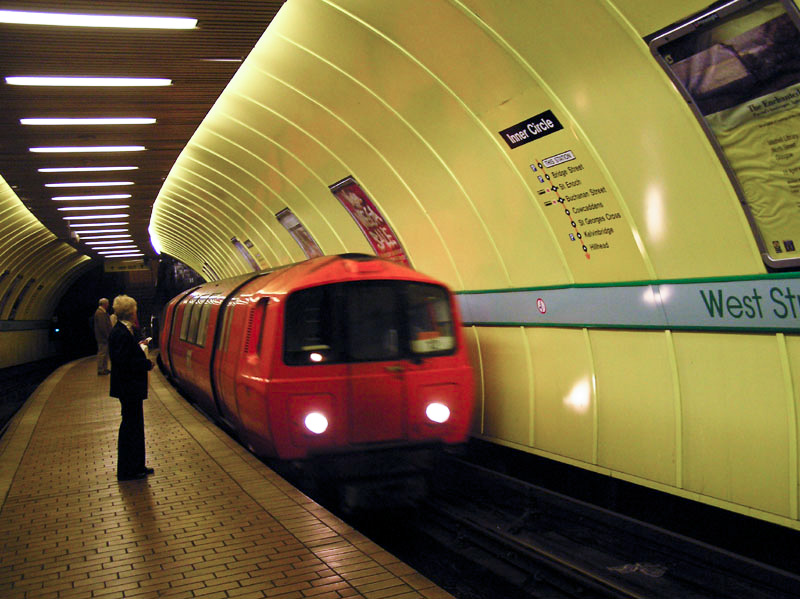
A second-generation train in 'Strathclyde red' livery at West street

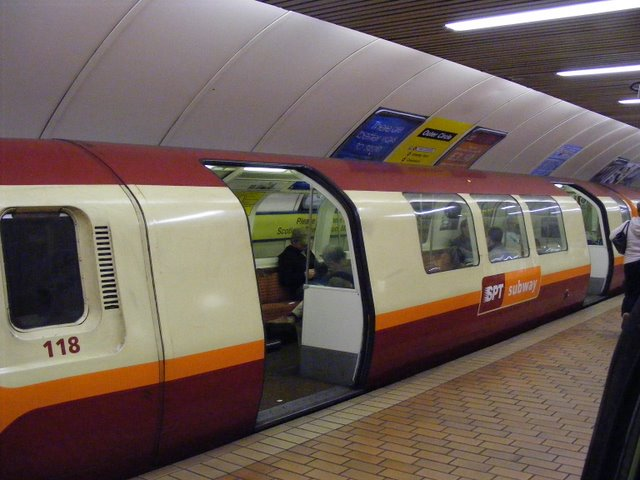
A second-generation train in 'Cream & Carmine' livery at Shields Road

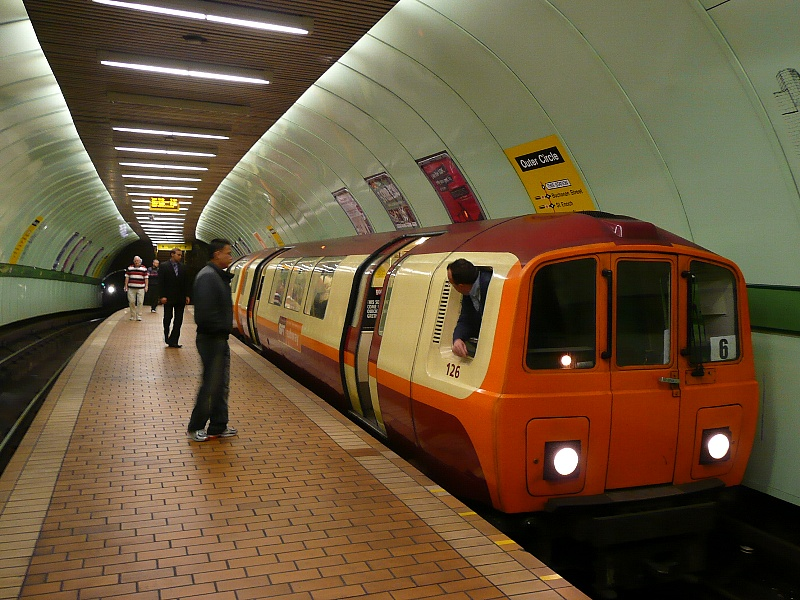
A second-generation train in 'Cream & Carmine' livery at Cowcaddens

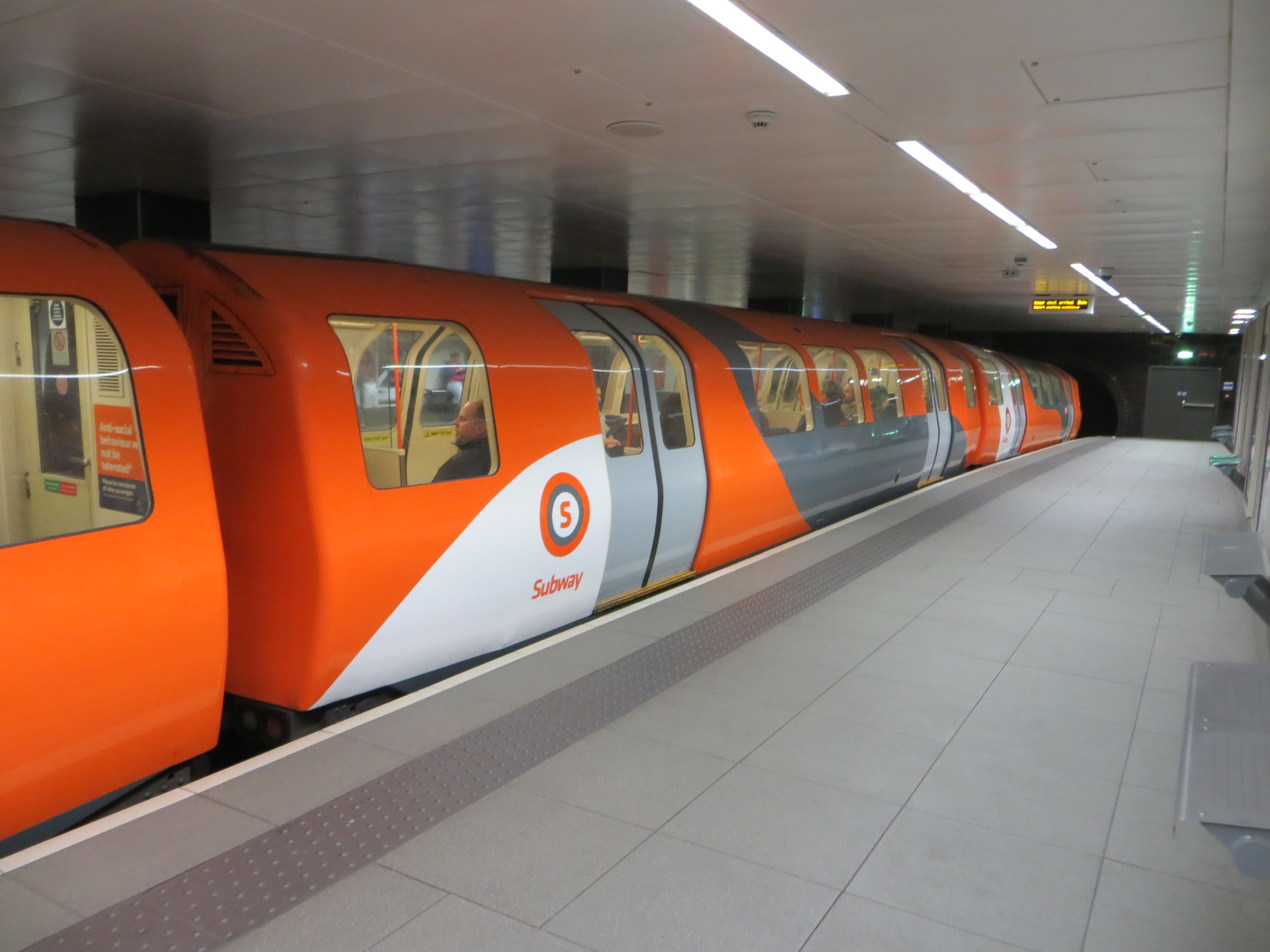
A second-generation train in 2011 orange livery

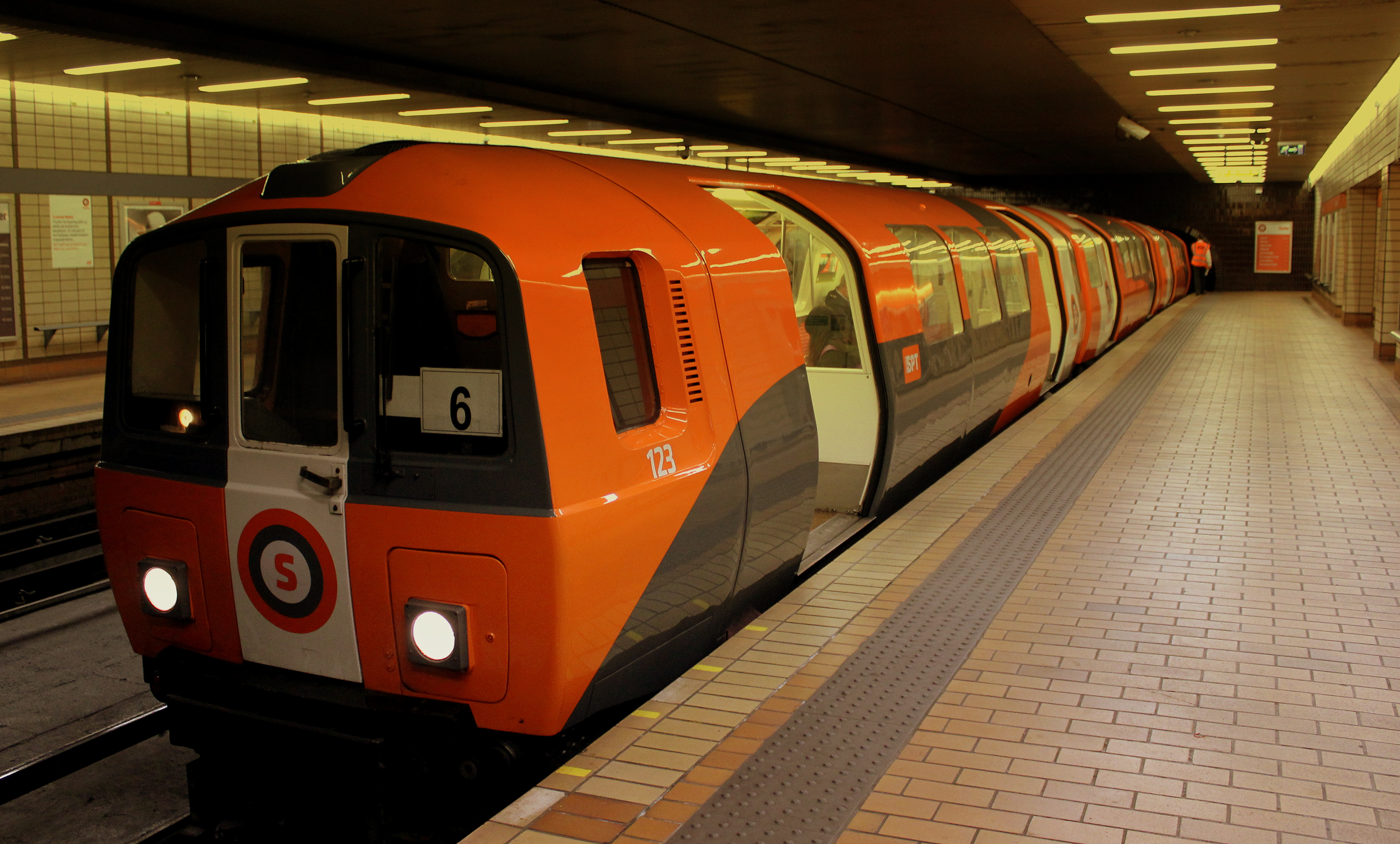
A second-generation train in 2011 orange livery at Buchanan Street

=== Withdrawal ===
Video: Cars 106, 207 and 120 depart Govan after the final passenger service of second-generation stock in June 2024

Car 122 was withdrawn in October 2015 and stripped of usable equipment in order to provide spare parts for the remaining fleet, being scrapped soon after.

Following the introduction of the Third Generation rolling stock in December 2023 full withdrawal of the fleet commenced with cars 115, 127 and 131. All three cars had been out of service awaiting repairs for some time before being officially withdrawn. As withdrawal continued, scrapping of the cars commenced in April 2024.

Upon withdrawal car 128 was preserved by Glasgow's Riverside Museum, owners of three First Generation subway cars. 128 was moved on display during June 2024.

The final day of operation for the second generation stock was 28 June 2024 with cars 106, 207 and 120 performing the final service for inner, and 119, 203 and 103 performing the last for outer operated by the type. In July 2024, SPT announced that old Subway carriages would be given away to charities or sold off for £5,000, potentially to be re-used as glamping pods or other buildings. Any remaining units after August 2024 would then be scrapped. In November 2024, it was announced that a substantial number of second generation cars have been salvaged although some cars were already scrapped.

=== Fleet List ===
Key:	Scrapped	Preserved/Further use

Fleet number	Notes Sourced from except where noted.
101	Scrapped during 2024
102	Scrapped during 2024
103	Scrapped during 2024
104	Scrapped during 2024
105	Stored, Springburn Works
106	Stored, Springburn Works
107	Purchased by social media celebrity and railfan Francis Bourgeois, Northumbria Rail, Northumberland
108	Scrapped during 2024
109	Scrapped during 2024
110	Stored, Springburn Works
111	Stored, Springburn Works
112	Stored, RSS Wishaw
113	Scrapped during 2024
114	Scrapped during 2024
115	Scrapped during 2024
116	Scrapped during 2024
117	Beatroute Arts community centre, Glasgow. The last second generation vehicle to be removed from the Subway infrastructure.
118	Stored, Springburn Works
119	Scrapped during 2024
120	Hutchesons Grammar School, Glasgow
121	Stored, Springburn Works
122	Scrapped during 2017
123	Scrapped during 2024
124	Ivy in the park, Glasgow. Planned to be used as an outdoor classroom.
125	Stored, Springburn Works
126	Privately owned, Cambridgeshire
127	Scrapped during 2024
128	Riverside Museum, Glasgow
129	Privately owned. Northumbria Rail, Northumberland
130	Stored, Doon Valley Railway, Dunaskin
131	Scrapped during 2024
132	Scrapped during 2024
133	Stored, Springburn Works
201	Scrapped during 2024
202	Stored, Springburn Works
203	Scrapped during 2024
204	Stored, Springburn Works
205	Scrapped during 2024
206	Stored, Springburn Works
207	Stored, Springburn Works
208	Scrapped during 2024

== First generation (1896–1977) ==
The first rolling stock was largely built in 1896, with additional trailer carriages added over the following 17 years. This rolling stock was converted from cable to electric traction in 1935 and finally withdrawn from service in 1977 upon the closure of the railway for modernisation.

First generation rolling stock
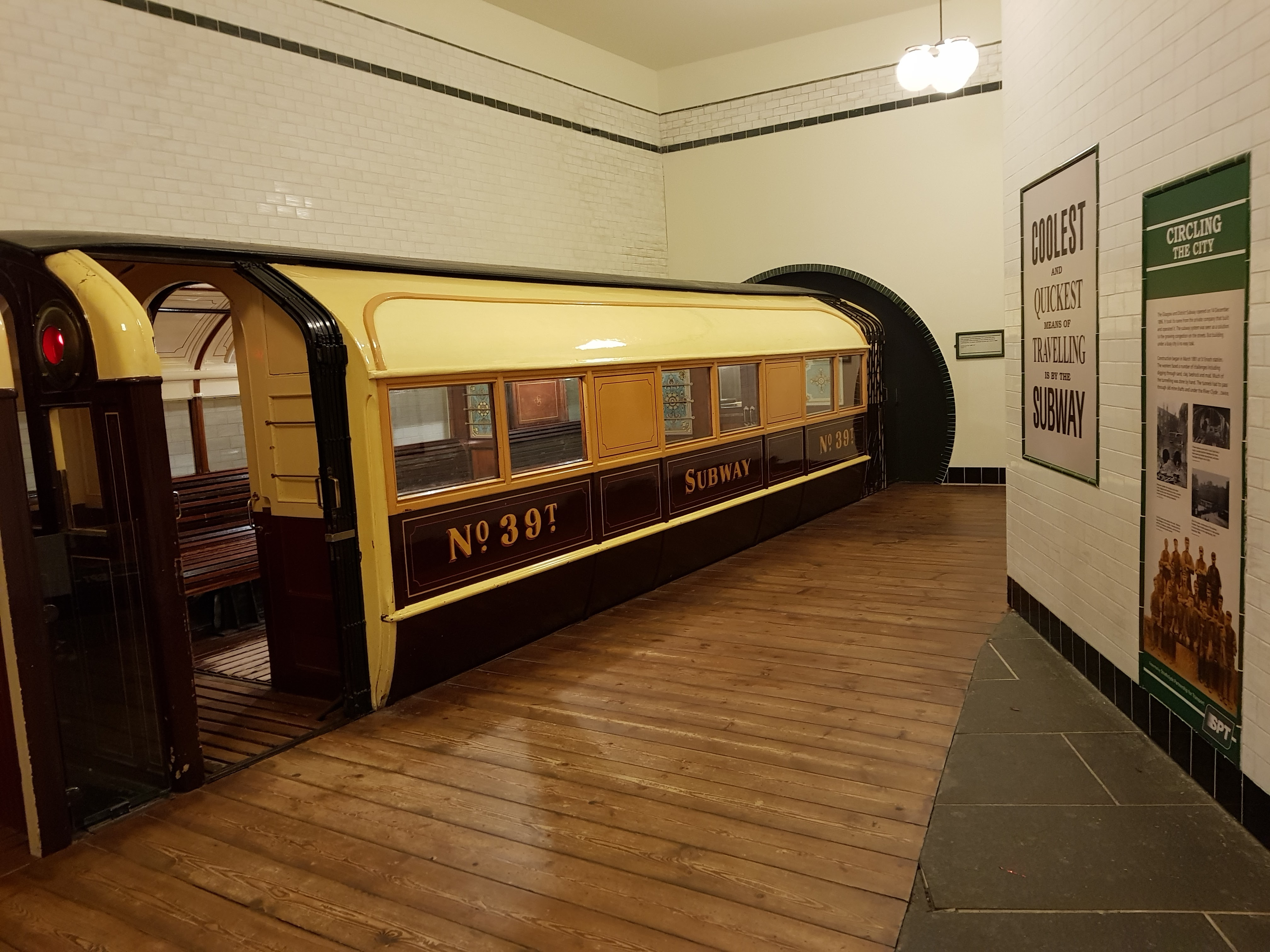
1898 carriage

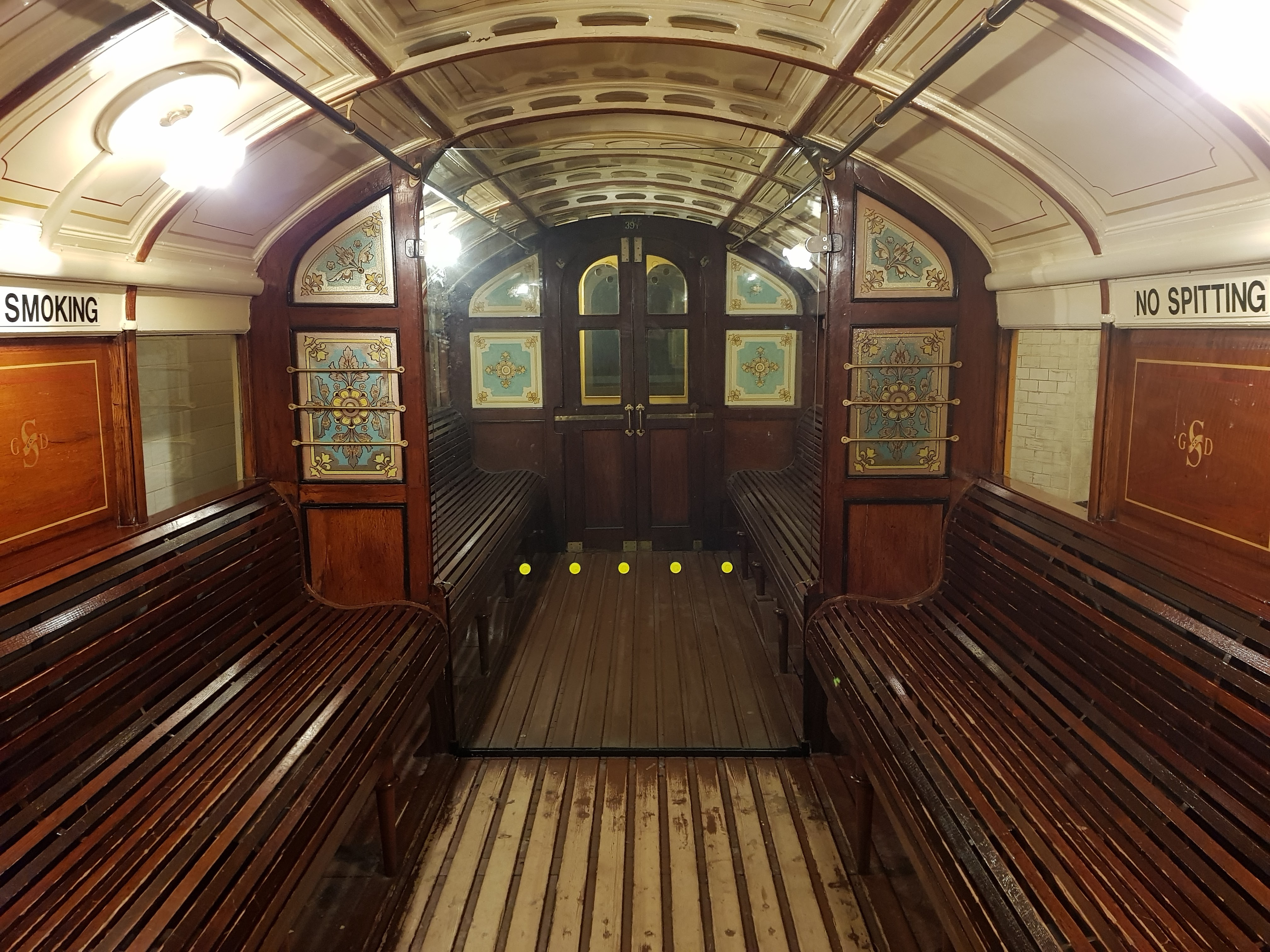
Original interior

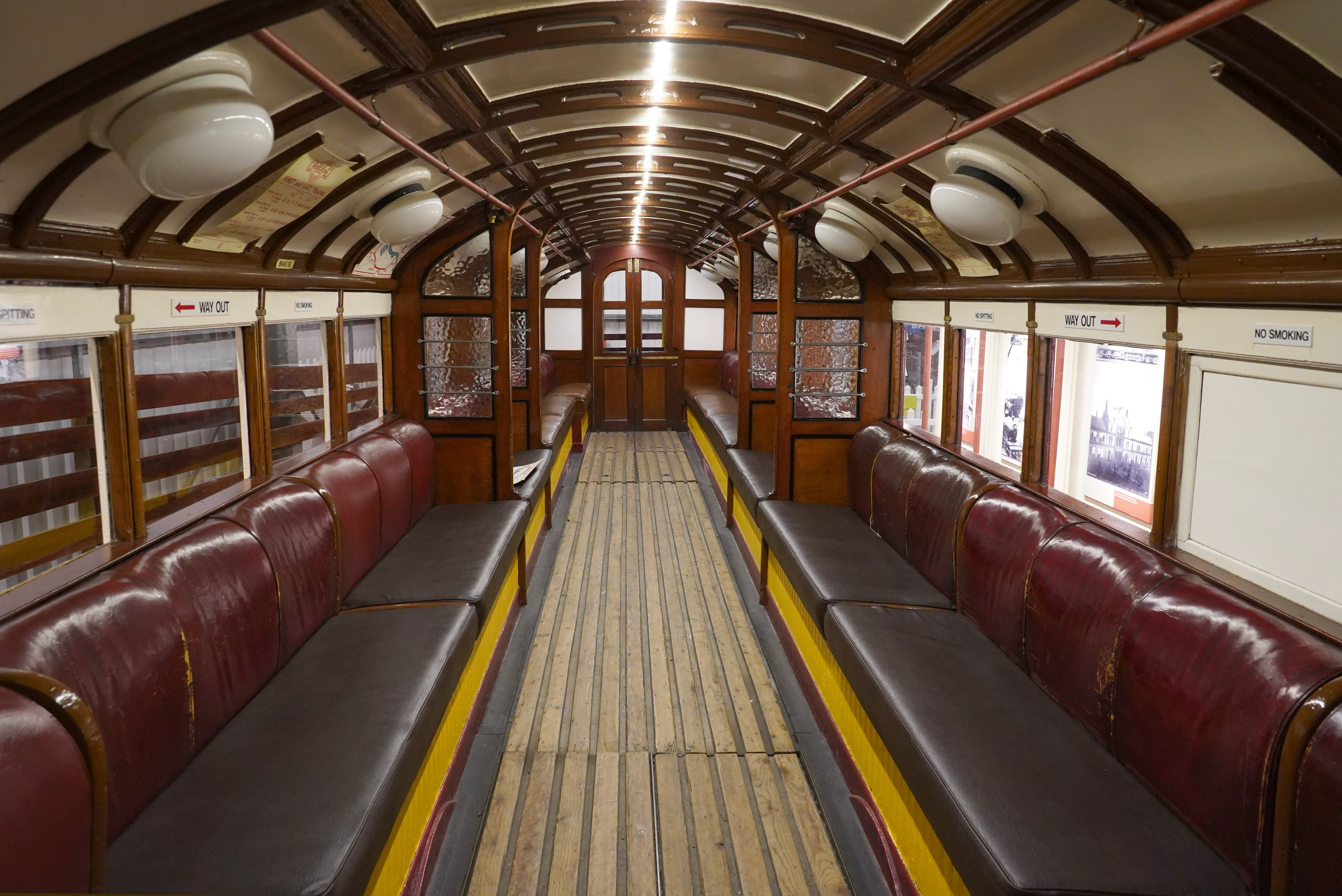
Refurbished interior
