= Metrolina (disambiguation) =

Metrolina is the metropolitan area within and surrounding the city of Charlotte, North Carolina.

Metrolina may also refer to:

- Metrolina Native American Association, a Native American community association in Mecklenburg County, North Carolina
- Metrolina Regional Scholars' Academy, a charter school in Charlotte, North Carolina
- Metrolina Speedway, a defunct auto racing track located in northeast Charlotte, North Carolina
- Metrolina Theatre Association, a non-profit organization based in Charlotte, North Carolina

== See also ==
- Metroliner (disambiguation)
- Metro line (disambiguation)
