= Stadler METRO =

Multiple unit passenger trainset built by Stadler Rail

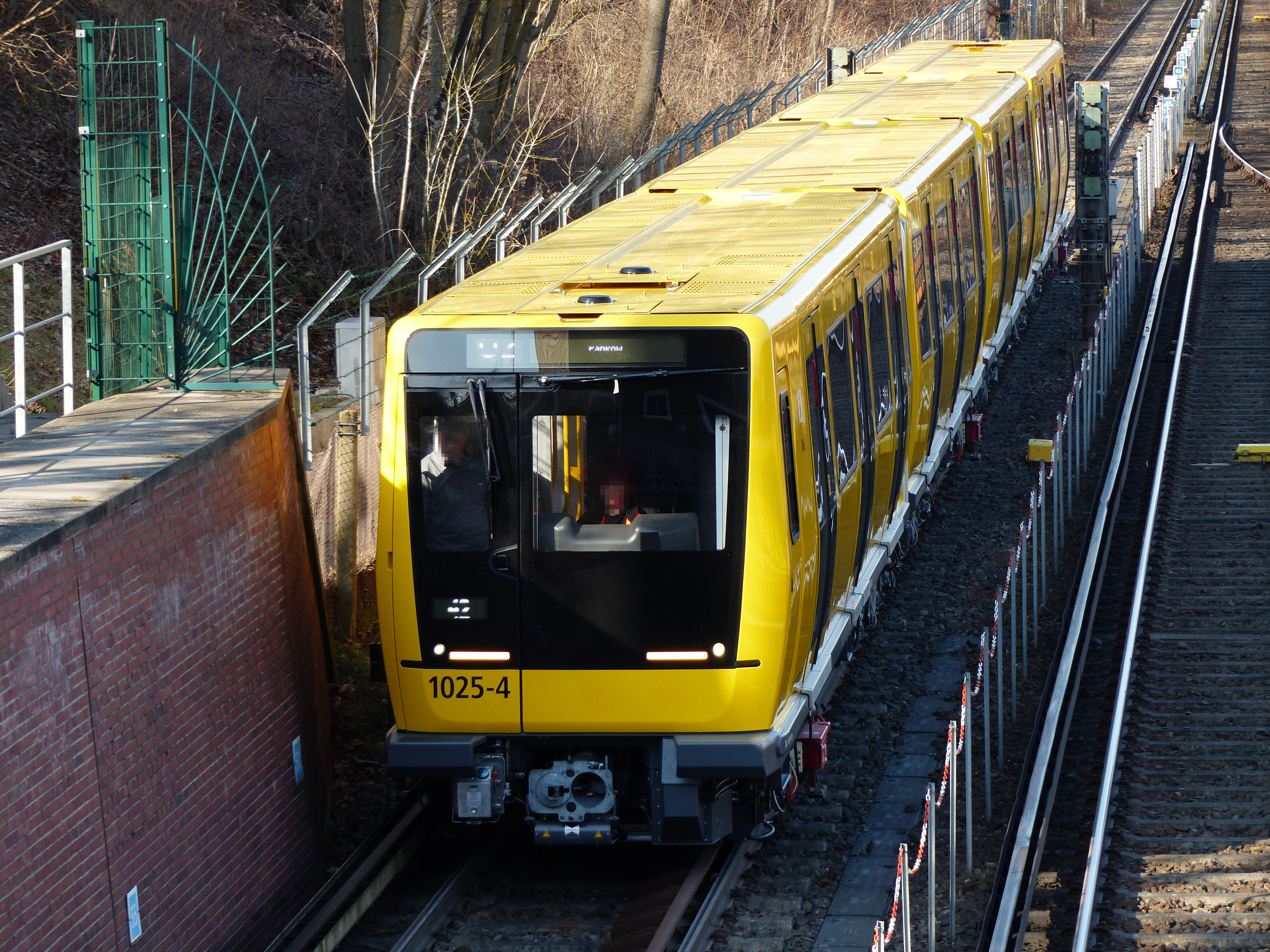
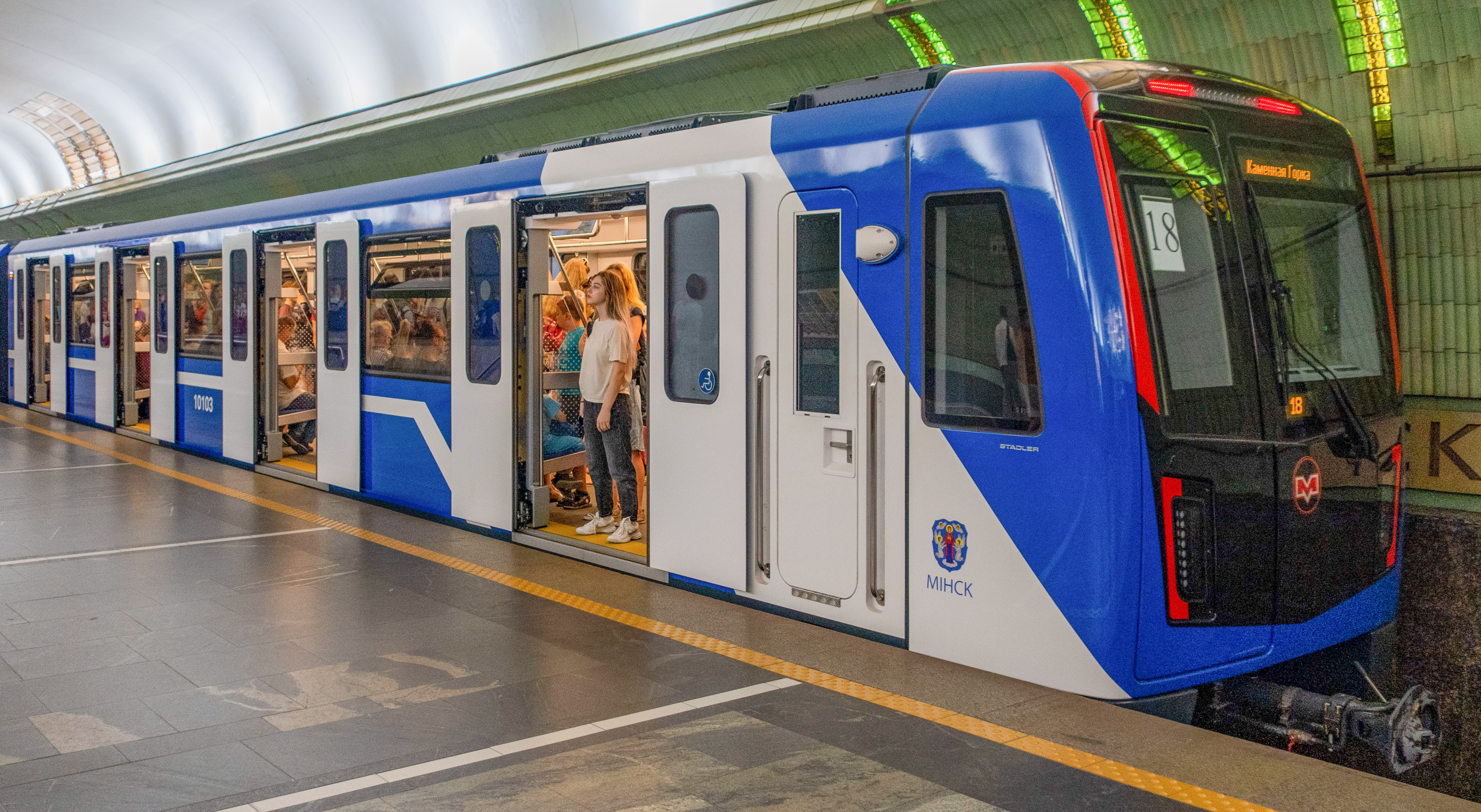
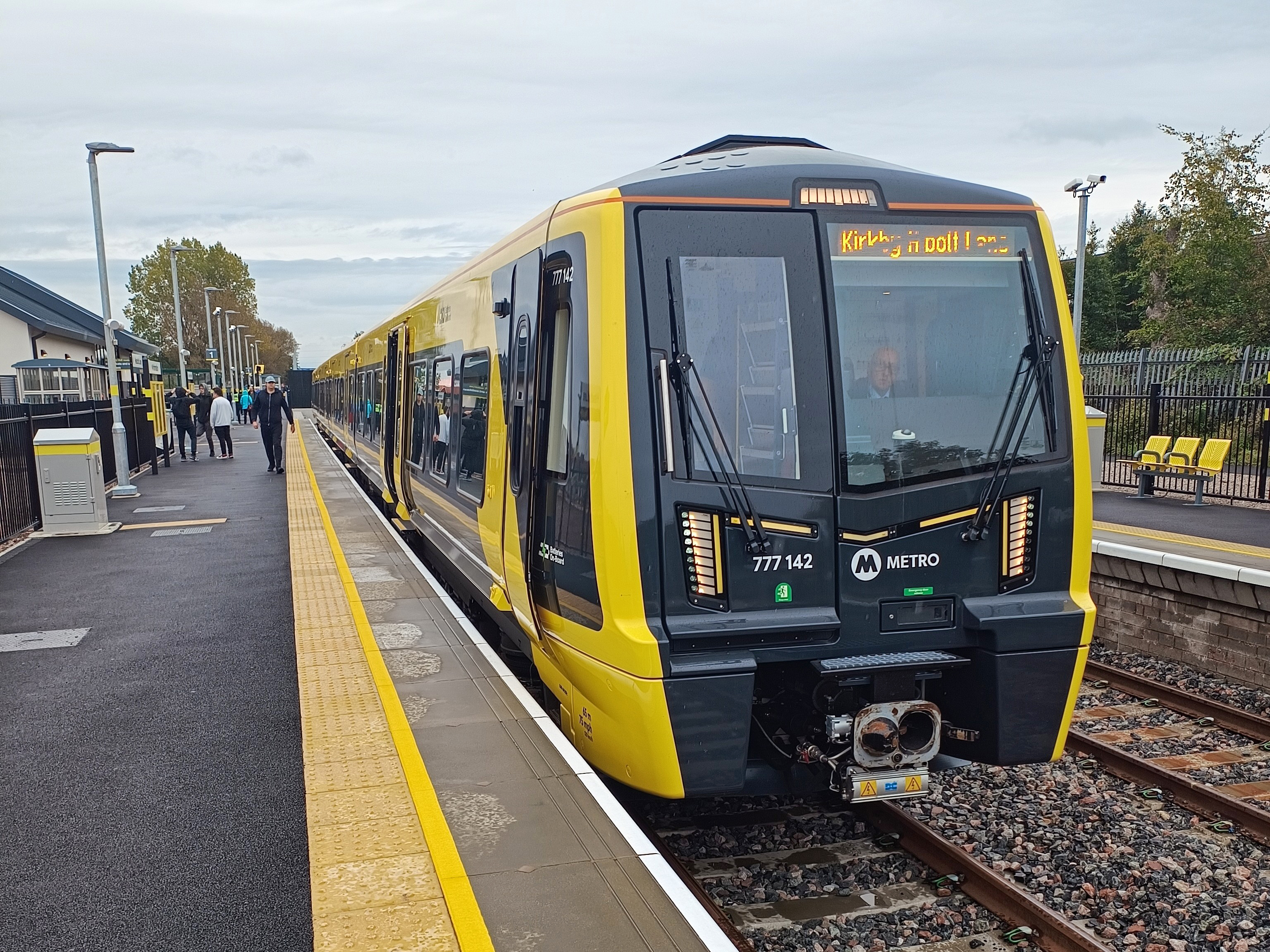
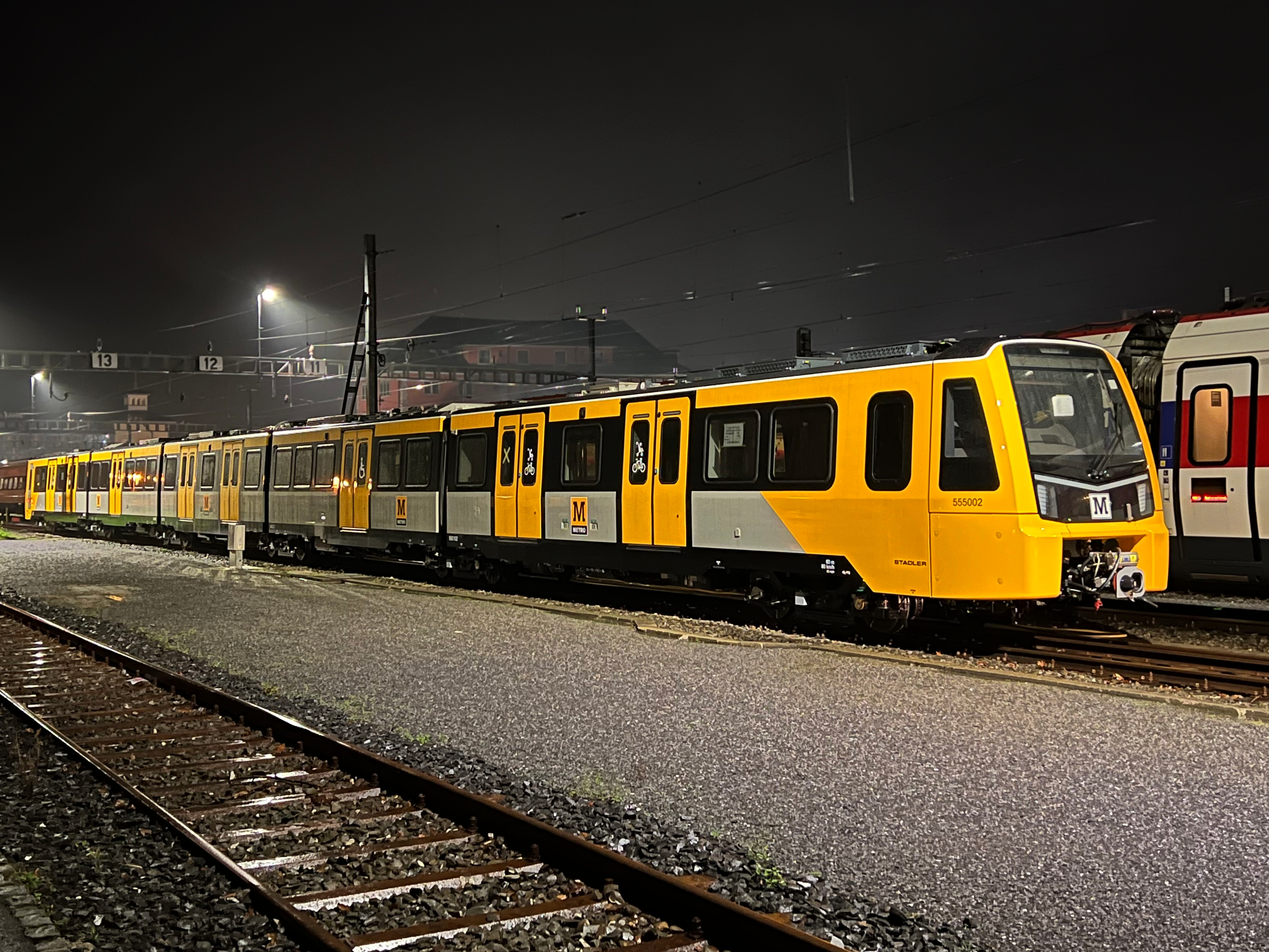
- Berlin's U-Bahn train type IK Stadler M110/M111 in Minsk Metro A third generation Glasgow Subway unit Stadler METRO IPEMU Class 777/1 for Merseyrail Tyne & Wear Metro Class 555
- Manufacturer: Stadler Rail
- Constructed: 2012–present

Specifications
- Maximum speed: 120 km/h (75 mph)
- Coupling system: Dellner

Stadler METRO is a platform of modular electric multiple unit and battery electric multiple unit trainsets made by Stadler Rail for use on heavy and light railways. They are currently used on the Berlin U-Bahn as BVG Class IK, the Minsk Metro as M110/M111 series, the Glasgow Subway as the G3 stock, on Merseyrail services in the Liverpool City Region as the Class 777 and on the Tyne and Wear Metro as the Class 555. They will soon be used on the MARTA subway system of Atlanta, Georgia, as the CQ400s, and on the Lisbon Metro as the ML 20 and ML 24 series.

== History and Development ==
Stadler introduced the METRO platform in 2012 as a modular family of electric and battery-electric trainsets designed for use on a variety of urban metro systems. The platform was developed to accommodate the wide technical variability found across global rapid transit networks, including differences in loading gauge, track gauge, traction power systems, and platform interfaces. To address these diverging standards, Stadler adopted a modular approach that allows operators to specify train length, interior configuration, door arrangements, and power-collection equipment.

Initial production began in the early 2010s, and early customers included systems in central and eastern Europe. The platform later saw wider adoption, with orders from operators in western Europe and the United Kingdom, followed by expansion into the United States when the Metropolitan Atlanta Rapid Transit Authority placed a major order in 2019.

Throughout its development, Stadler has refined the METRO platform through incremental technical updates. These include a lightweight carbody constructed from aluminium and high-strength steel, enhanced HVAC systems, and the incorporation of redundant onboard subsystems intended to improve fleet availability. The platform is also designed for compatibility with high levels of rail automation, supporting operation up to Grade of Automation 4 (unattended train operation).

By the mid-2020s, the METRO had become one of Stadler’s principal urban-rail product families, with continuing repeat orders and new-build fleets such as the ML 20 and ML 24 series for Lisbon’s metro network.

== Specification ==
METRO trains are a fully customizable electric multiple unit train, primarily for urban rapid transit systems, that can be built from two to ten cars, and can accommodate up to 900 passengers.

The trains are fully electric, using a mix of third rail, pantograph, or batteries for power, however only two of the three options can be picked due to space limitations on the trains.

The battery variation of the train can do between 20 and 55 km (12 and 34 miles) without charging, and can be recharged in less than 15 minutes.

While most variants have interior and exterior similarities, such as automatic sliding steps to allow for step free access, a majority of the features on each train are completely customizable to fit the demands and needs of the customer.

== Operators ==
=== Belarus ===
In 2016, the Minsk Metro placed an order for ten units containing six four-car and four five-car trainsets that will replace older rolling stock. These entered service in February 2020.

=== Germany ===
In August 2011, BVG placed an order with Stadler for 40 four-car units in the form of the BVG Class IK for the small-profile network of the Berlin U-Bahn In August 2015, the first two units arrived and were put into passenger service as prototypes. Upon a successful trial phase, the other 38 units where delivered and put in service.

Stadler are also working on other trains for the BVG in the form of the BVG Class J and JK, which will be a mixture of two- and four-car units. Stadler state they are making 376 cars as two or four car units for the network.

=== Italy ===
In 2021, Stadler signed a contract with Ente Autonomo Volturno to supply and maintain up to 40 units. They will be used on Circumvesuviana services.

=== Portugal ===
In 2021, Stadler won a contract to supply 14 three-car trains for Lisbon Metro. They are designated as the ML 20 series. The first train was delivered on 9 August 2024 and is planned to enter service in January 2025.

In October 2024, Lisbon Metro again signed a contract with Stadler, this time for the supply of 24 three-car trains with an option for 12 more, designated as the ML 24 series.

=== Spain ===
Between 2007 and 2013, Metrovalencia, operated by Ferrocarrils de la Generalitat Valenciana, received Series 4300 trains manufactured by Vossloh. Following the purchase of Vossloh's factory in Valencia by Stadler, the trains have been part of the METRO range.

In 2017, Ferrocarrils de la Generalitat de Catalunya placed an order for 15 METRO units for use on the Barcelona–Vallès Line. The four-car trains are 80 m long and designated class 115. The first train entered service in March 2022.

=== United States ===
In March 2019, Metropolitan Atlanta Rapid Transit Authority (MARTA) placed an order for 127 units for MARTA rail. Designated CQ400, four trainsets were delivered by January 2026 and are expected to enter service by the start of the 2026 FIFA World Cup.

=== United Kingdom ===
In 2016, Strathclyde Partnership for Transport (SPT) placed an order worth £280 million for Glasgow Subway G3 stock trains, and general railway modernisations with Stadler and Ansaldo STS. These trains have provisions to become driverless. Delivered in May 2019, the trains entered service on 11 December 2023.

In December 2016, Merseytravel placed an order with Stadler for 52 units, later increasing this to 53, designated as the British Rail Class 777. On 23 January 2023, the units began passenger service; however, the rollout has not completed due to teething issues. As of August 2024, the rollout is in its final phase. Throughout the introduction of the new trains, Metro Mayor Steve Rotheram has criticised Stadler and requested compensation for the "frustratingly poor" performance of the new fleet.

In January 2020, Tyne and Wear Passenger Transport Executive (Nexus) placed an order for 42 units, later increasing this to 46 to cope with expected passenger demands. The Metro's Class 555 had similar issues to Merseyrail's Class 777, with Nexus imposing £1.4 million of contract penalties on Stadler for "underperformance". The first of the class was introduced on 18 December 2024.

== Fleet details ==
Class	Operator	Number built	Year built	Service years	Cars per set	Notes	Ref.
Belarus
M110/M111	Minsk Metro	10	Unknown	2016	5		
M110/M111	Minsk Metro	10	Unknown	2016	4		
Germany
BVG Class IK	Berliner Verkehrsbetriebe (Berlin U-Bahn)	40	2014–2020	2015	4	For the small-profile network	
BVG Class JK	Berliner Verkehrsbetriebe (Berlin U-Bahn)	36			2	For the small-profile network	
BVG Class JK	Berliner Verkehrsbetriebe (Berlin U-Bahn)	17			4	For the small-profile network	
BVG Class J	Berliner Verkehrsbetriebe (Berlin U-Bahn)	52			2	For the large-profile network	
BVG Class J	Berliner Verkehrsbetriebe (Berlin U-Bahn)	33			4	For the large-profile network	
Italy
Series 300	Ente Autonomo Volturno	60	2021–present		3		
Portugal
ML 20 series	Lisbon Metro	14	2021-present		3		
ML 24 series	Lisbon Metro	24	2024-present		3		
Spain
Series 4300	Ferrocarrils de la Generalitat Valenciana	42	2007–2013		4	While made prior to the METRO name, Stadler classes the 4300 series as a part of the start of the range.	
Series 4300	Ferrocarrils de la Generalitat Valenciana	20	2007–2013		5	While made prior to the METRO name, Stadler classes the 4300 series as a part of the start of the range.	
Series 115	Ferrocarrils de la Generalitat de Catalunya	15	2021		4		
United States
CQ400	MARTA rail	127	2020–present		4		
United Kingdom
777/0	Merseyrail	46	2018–2022	2021-present	4	Standard variant.	
777/1	Merseyrail	7	2022–2023		4	Variant fitted with traction batteries for use on unelectrified lines.	
555	Nexus	46	2021–present	2025-present	5		
G3	Strathclyde Partnership for Transport	17	2016–2022		4	Driverless trains for the Glasgow Subway	
