= Metro City =

MetroCity or Metro City or variation, can refer to:

- Metropolitan area of a city
- Central city of a metropolitan area
- Metropolis, a metropolitan city

== Places ==
- Metro City (Hong Kong), a private housing estate and a shopping centre in Tseung Kwan O, Hong Kong
- Metro City (Indonesia), a city in Lampung, Indonesia
- Metro-City, a shopping mall in Xujiahui, Shanghai, China
- MetroCity AVM, a shopping mall in Istanbul, Turkey
- Metro City metro station, Najpur Metro, Najpur, Vidarbha, Maharashtra, India
- Metro City, Changwon, Gyeongsangnam-do, South Korea; a real estate development, see List of tallest buildings in South Korea
- Metrocity Towers, Istanbul, Turkey; a real estate development, see List of tallest buildings in Istanbul

== Fictional locations ==
Metro City is a fictional setting for

- Final Fight, a fighting game series taking place on the Atlantic coast
- Nightshade (1992 video game)
- Double Dragon (TV series), a 1993 animated television program
- The Demolitionist, a 1995 film
- Inspector Gadget (1983 TV series), an animated television series and 1999 film
- Viper (TV series), a 1990s television series
- Astro Boy (film), a 2009 CGI Movie
- Megamind, a 2010 CGI Movie
- A level in the 2004 Video Game War of the Monsters, set in the 1950s
- Primary location of 21 Jump Street film

== Other uses ==
- Optare MetroCity, a motorbus, an integral midibus manufactured by Optare
- Metro City Bank, a U.S. bank
- MetroCity AI, an IT company in the Philippines

== See also ==
- Sydney Metro City & Southwest, a rapid transit project in Sydney, Australia
- Metro (disambiguation)
- City (disambiguation)
