= Metroliner =

Metroliner or Metro Liner may refer to:

- Metroliner (train), a former train service between New York and Washington, D.C.
- Budd Metroliner, rail coaches and cabs used on the Metroliner service above
- Fairchild Swearingen Metroliner, an aircraft
- MCW Metroliner, a British bus
- NABI 60-BRT, the buses developed for the Metro Liner bus rapid transit system in California

== See also ==
- Metro line (disambiguation)
- Metrolina (disambiguation)
- Liner (disambiguation)
- Metro (disambiguation)
