= BVG Class JK =

Rolling stock for Berlin U-Bahn

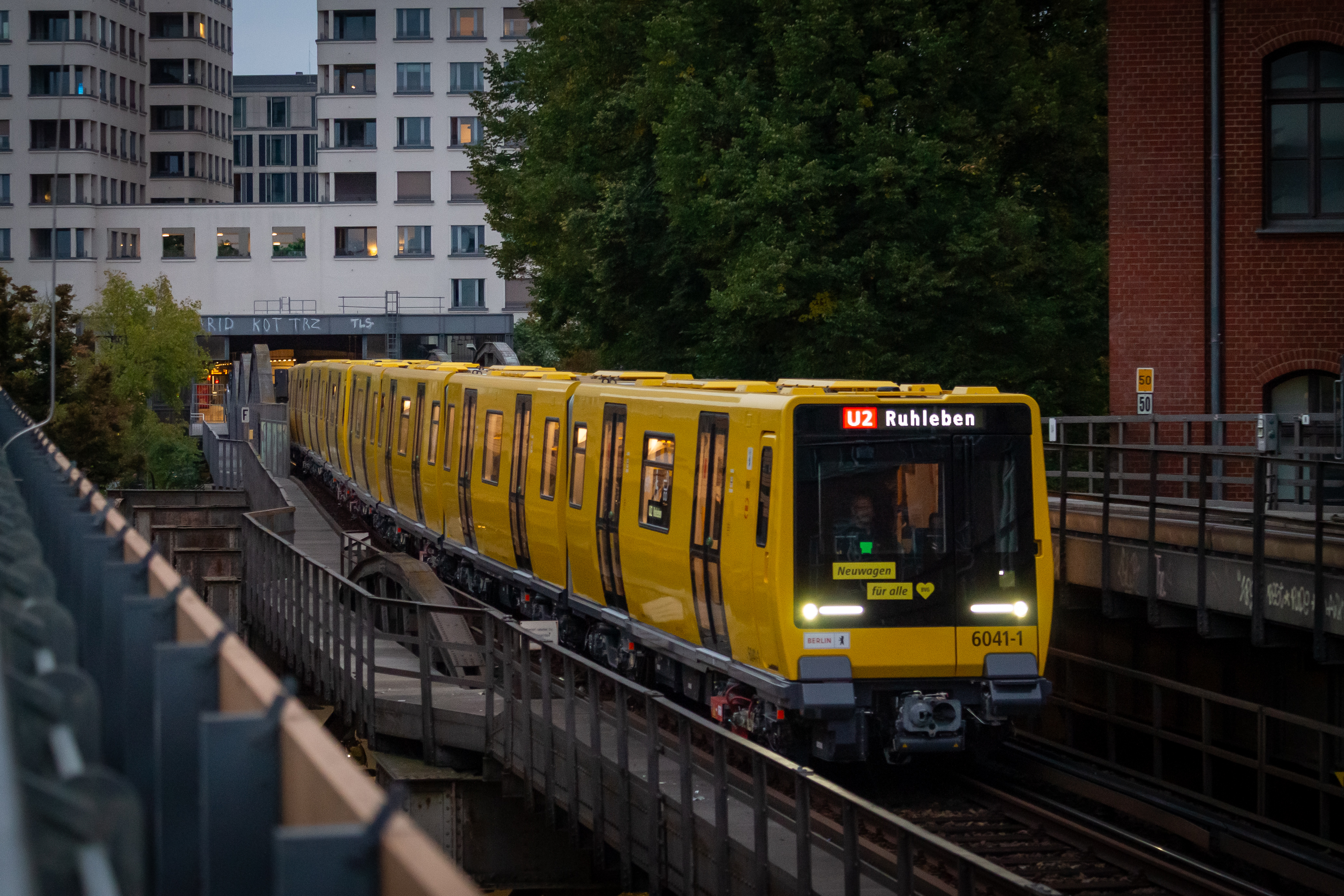
- BVG Class JK on U2
- Stock type: Electric multiple unit
- In service: 2025–present
- Manufacturer: Stadler Rail
- Built at: Pankow
- Family name: METRO
- Replaced: A3, G
- Constructed: 2023–
- Entered service: 18 September 2025
- Number built: 36 trains (2 car sets); 17 trains (4-car sets)
- Number in service: 53 trainsets
- Formation: 2-car: DM-DM; 4-car: DM–M–M–DM
- Fleet numbers: 6001–6053
- Capacity: 22 seats, 118 standing (2 car set) 82 seats, 227 standing (4 car set)
- Operator: Berliner Verkehrsbetriebe
- Lines served: U1, U2, U3, & U4

Specifications
- Car body construction: Aluminium
- Train length: 2-car: 25.82 m (84 ft 8 9/16 in); 4-car: 51.64 m (169 ft 5 1/16 in)
- Car length: 12.91 m (42 ft 4 1/4 in)
- Width: 2.4 m (7 ft 10 1/2 in)
- Height: 3.16 m (10 ft 4 7/16 in)
- Floor height: 875 mm (34 7/16 in)
- Entry: level
- Doors: Sliding plug, 2 per side
- Maximum speed: 70 km/h (43 mph)
- Traction system: ABB BORDLINE CC750 DC 750V U 800 119A01 2-level IGBT–VVVF
- Traction motors: 6–12 × TSA TMR 39A-18-4 100 kW (134 hp) asynchronous 3-phase AC
- Power output: 2-car: 600 kW (805 hp); 4-car: 1,200 kW (1,609 hp)
- Electric systems: 750 V DC (nominal) from third rail
- Current collection: Contact shoe
- UIC classification: (1A)Bo′(+Bo′(A1)+(1A)Bo′)+Bo′(A1)
- Braking systems: Regenerative, rheostatic, electro-pneumatic
- Coupling system: Scharfenberg
- Track gauge: 1,435 mm (4 ft 8 1/2 in) standard gauge

The BVG Class JK is a type of electric multiple units operated by the Berlin U-Bahn.
