= Metro line =

Metro Line, Metro line, or Metroline may refer to:

- Metro line, a line of a rapid transit system
- Metro Line, a specific line of the Edmonton, Alberta, Canada LRT system
- Metroline, a London bus operator
- Metro Line M1-M5, multiple lines of the Budapest Metro
- Metro x Line, multiple lines of the Metro Transit (Minnesota) system

== See also ==
- Metroliner (disambiguation)
- Metrolina (disambiguation)
- Metro (disambiguation)
- Line (disambiguation)
