= Metro Police =

Metro Police may refer to:

- Metropolitan Police Department of the District of Columbia
- Las Vegas Metropolitan Police Department
- Metropolitan Nashville Police Department
- Louisville Metro Police Department
- Metropolitan District Commission Police, one of several Defunct Massachusetts police agencies
- Metropolitan Police Service, the territorial police force responsible for law enforcement in Greater London
- Metropolitan Transit Authority of Harris County Metro Police Department commonly known as the Metro Police, regional transit police department in Greater Houston
- Metro-Dade Police Department commonly known as the Metro Police from 1981 to 1997, then changed name to Miami-Dade Police Department in 1997 to 2025, now Miami-Dade Sheriff's Office

== See also ==
- Metro (disambiguation)
- Metropolitan Police (disambiguation)
