= Metropolitan Police (disambiguation) =

The Metropolitan Police is the police force serving Greater London, England (excluding the City of London).

Metropolitan Police may also refer to:

== Bangladesh ==
- Metropolitan Police (Bangladesh), including:
  - Barisal Metropolitan Police
  - Chattogram Metropolitan Police
  - Dhaka Metropolitan Police
  - Gazipur Metropolitan Police
  - Khulna Metropolitan Police
  - Rajshahi Metropolitan Police
  - Rangpur Metropolitan Police
  - Sylhet Metropolitan Police

== India ==
- Chennai Metropolitan Police
- Cyberabad Metropolitan Police
- Delhi Police
- Kolkata Police
- Mumbai Police

== United States ==
- Indianapolis Metropolitan Police Department
- LAPD Metropolitan Division, Los Angeles
- Las Vegas Metropolitan Police Department
- Louisville Metro Police Department
- Metropolitan Transit Authority of Harris County Metro Police Department, regional transit police department in Greater Houston
- Metro-Dade Police Department commonly known as the Metro Police from 1981 to 1997, then changed name to Miami-Dade Police Department in 1997 to 2025, now Miami-Dade Sheriff's Office
- Metropolitan District Commission Police, the police of the Metropolitan District Commission of Connecticut
- Metropolitan District Commission Police, commonly known as the Metropolitan Police, a former agency in Massachusetts that was merged with the Massachusetts State Police in 1992
- Metropolitan Nashville Police Department
- Metropolitan Police Department, City of St. Louis
- Metropolitan Police Department of the District of Columbia, Washington, D.C.
- Metropolitan Police Force, predecessor of the New York City Police Department
- Metropolitan Transportation Authority Police Department, New York City
- Savannah-Chatham Metropolitan Police Department (disbanded in 2017)

== Other countries ==
- Buenos Aires Metropolitan Police (Policía Metropolitana de Buenos Aires), Argentina (now merged into Buenos Aires City Police in 2017)
- Caracas Metropolitan Police (Policía Metropolitana de Caracas), Venezuela, involved in the 2002 Llaguno Overpass events
- Dublin Metropolitan Police, Ireland, now absorbed into the Garda Síochána
- Greater Jakarta Metropolitan Regional Police, Indonesia
- Metropolitan Police Bureau, Bangkok, Thailand
- Metropolitan Police Service, Greater London, England, United Kingdom
- Metropolitan Toronto Police Force, Canada, in 1957 to 1998 but now officially called the Toronto Police Service
- Seoul Metropolitan Police Agency, South Korea
- Tokyo Metropolitan Police Department, Japan
- West Yorkshire Metropolitan Police, England, in 1974 to 1986 but now officially called West Yorkshire Police

== Other uses ==
- Metro Police (disambiguation)
- Metropolitan Police F.C., the football club of the Greater London Metropolitan Police

== See also ==
- Metropolitan (disambiguation)
