= Metro TV =

Metro TV may refer to:

- Metro TV (Ghana), a television station in Ghana
- Metro TV (Indonesian TV network), a television network in Indonesia
