= NRK Metro =

Norwegian radio station

Coordinates: 59°56′08″N 10°43′08″E

- Norway
- Broadcast area: Norway
- Frequency: NRK DAB multiplex

Programming
- Language: Norwegian Bokmål

Ownership
- Owner: NRK

History
- First air date: 2000; 26 years ago

NRK Metro was a Norwegian digital radio station from NRK. The station launched in 2000 in order to "compete with a large group of listeners with commercial radio network". The goal was to increase NRK's radio audience in Norway, as well as increasing interest among digital radio among a large group of consumers. The station closed in 2001, becoming the first NRK station to do so.

== History ==
NRK Metro started broadcasting in early 2000, targeting an urban youth demographic. On 1 November, as part of cost-cutting measures, it announced the closure of the station, with its last broadcast taking place on 10 November. The corporation thus saved NOK 8 million. NRK subsequently delayed the closing date of the station, as there were plans to sell it to a commercial company. On 10 May 2001, NRK gave up on the selling process.

In 2008, seven years after the closure, Twentyfirst Venture acquired the usage of the Metro name for a commercial radio project, Radio Metro, from NRK.
