= Metrobus (Tegucigalpa) =

The Metrobús was a proposed public bus rapid transit system in Tegucigalpa, Honduras.

The capital of Honduras suffered from severe traffic congestion for decades, and reliable public transportation system is badly needed. The mayor, Ricardo Antonio Álvarez Arias, announced on 25 November 2010 the construction of a Metrobus system, and that US$ 150 million dollars (570 million Lempiras) would be allocated for the construction by the Inter-American Bank of Development as a loan. The construction was expected to take between two and three years.

On 24 October 2013, inhabitants of the Colonia John F. Kennedy demonstrated protesting construction of the metrobus terminal.

In June 2016, the authorities were saying the system could be opened in 2017.

By 2022, the project still hadn’t been finished, so the new city hall decided to cancel the project.

== Trans 450 ==
The buses will be of approximate from 18 metres (59 ft) to 24 metres (79 ft) in length, with capacity more than 160 passengers and manufactured by Marcopolo/Caio Induscar. They will include high technology for access, cameras for surveillance, and a centre for control and communications.
