= BVG Class IK =

German electric multiple unit train type

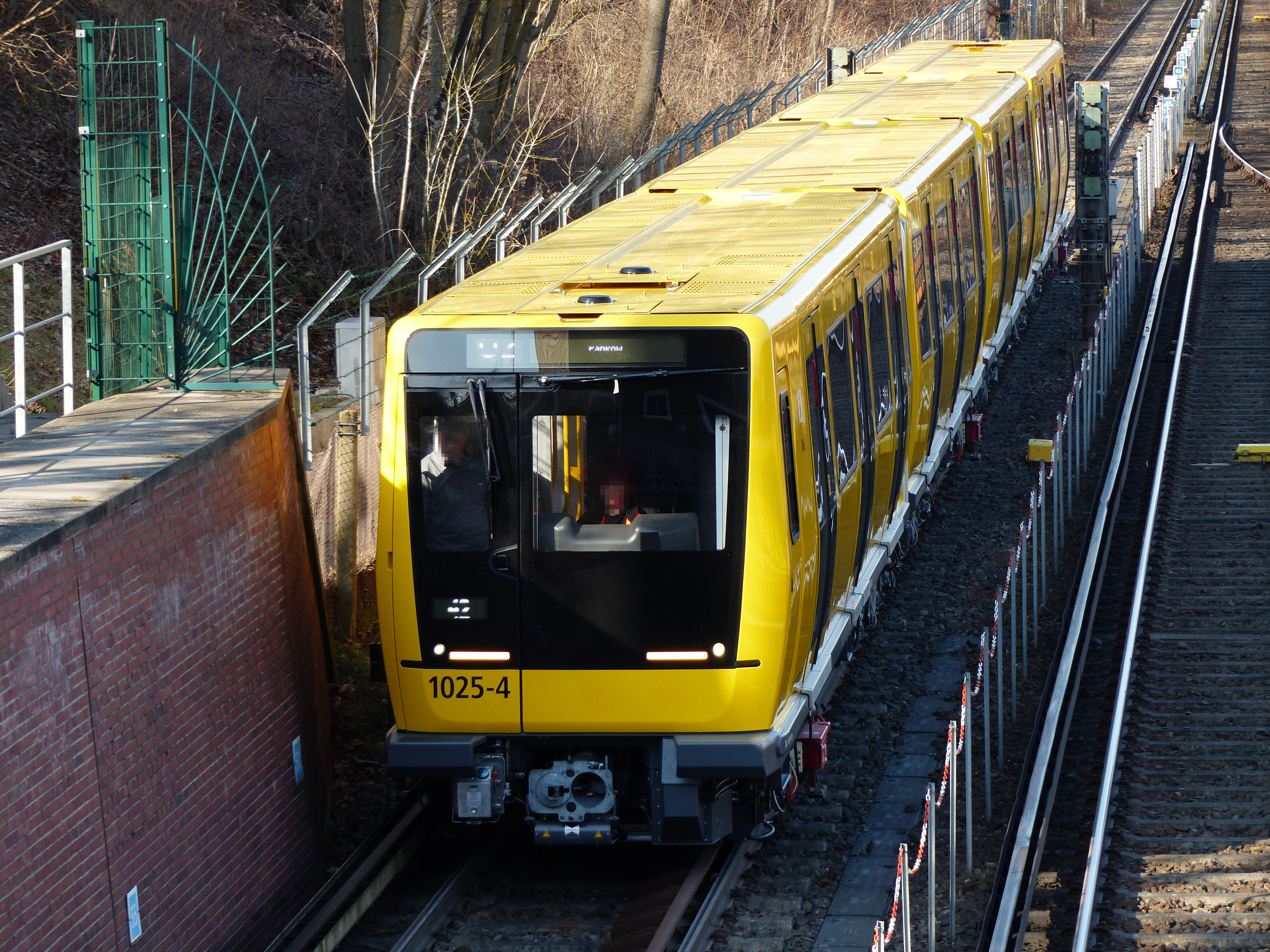
- A Class IK train
- In service: 2015–present
- Manufacturer: Stadler Rail
- Built at: Pankow
- Constructed: 2014–2020
- Entered service: 2015
- Number built: 2 trains (IK15); 11 trains (IK17); 27 trains (IK18); 14 trains (IK20)
- Number in service: Total 54 trains
- Formation: 4 cars (DM–M–M–DM) per unit, 2 units per train
- Fleet numbers: 1025–1026 (IK15); 1027–1037 (IK17); 1038–1064 (IK18); 5065–5078 (IK20)
- Capacity: 72/80 seated, 258 standing, 2 wheelchair spaces
- Operator: Berliner Verkehrsbetriebe
- Lines served: U1, U2, U3, U4 and U5

Specifications
- Car body construction: Aluminium-alloy, double-skin
- Train length: 51.64 m (169 ft 5 1/16 in)
- Width: 2.4 m (7 ft 10 1/2 in)
- Height: 3.21 m (10 ft 6 3/8 in)
- Floor height: 875 mm (34 7/16 in)
- Entry: level
- Doors: Sliding plug, 3 per side
- Maximum speed: 70 km/h (43 mph)
- Traction system: ABB BORDLINE CC400 DC 750V U 1000 2-level IGBT–VVVF
- Traction motors: 12 × VEM DKOBZ 0606-4 90 kW (121 hp) asynchronous 3-phase AC
- Power output: 1,080 kW (1,448 hp)
- Electric systems: 750 V DC (nominal) from third rail
- Current collection: Contact shoe
- UIC classification: 2′Bo′+Bo′Bo′+Bo′Bo′+Bo′2′
- Braking systems: Regenerative, rheostatic, electro-pneumatic
- Coupling system: Scharfenberg
- Track gauge: 1,435 mm (4 ft 8 1/2 in) standard gauge

The BVG Class IK is a type of electrical multiple unit used on the Berlin U-Bahn.

== History ==
In August 2011, BVG announced an order of IK series to replace A3L71 stock which had reached the end of its working life. Two prototypes were bought from Stadler Rail with the remaining 38 units being delivered between 2015 and 2017. These trains are based on the Stadler Tango family of trams and light rail vehicles, but resemble and function like a full-fledged subway train. The number '1xxx' will be jumped into '18Yxxx' (where Y is the train car number). Due to regenerative braking the trains will recuperate up to 20% of the energy they require.

In 2012, BVG had awarded the tender for Class IK to Stadler Pankow, which replaced the life-expired A3L71 trains, which consists of 24 trains. It costed 158 million Euros and had the option for 10 more trains. In May 2015, BVG nicknamed the train "Icke". In September 2015, the first two trains were delivered – 1025 and 1026, into U1 and U2 respectively. In July 2016, BVG unveiled plans to buy 27 more trains.

From July to December 2017, BVG delivered 11 more trains under IK17. The trains were deployed to the bigger profile U5, which is due to shortage of trains. It is also called "Class I". The first train began running on 27 October 2017.

From April 2018, BVG had bought 27 more trains and delivered under IK18, which replaced the A3L71.

In August 2017, U5 needed 20 more trains under I20. This is because of various reasons as mentioned above. The Class D trains were retired when the U55 extended to Alexanderplatz and was replaced by I-Class trains. With the delivery of the first IK20 unit 5065 on 25 May 2020 during the COVID-19 pandemic, the next delivery series of the IK series began, which again, like the IK17, would initially be in the large profile on the U5 line in order to have enough rolling stock for the planned end of 2020, to have a connection to Berlin Hauptbahnhof. The gap bridges known from the IK17 were installed accordingly. Significant differences to previous series are, for example, the new seat upholstery with the name "Urban Jungle", which is based on the well-known worm pattern from older BVG series and can already be found in new vehicles in the bus sector. Significantly fewer passenger information monitors were also installed in the passenger compartment. The numbering is also different here. Unlike its predecessors, the trains are included in the 5000 range. The reason for this is that in the small profile the numbers from 1070 to 1095 are still occupied by the GI/1E series, which is in active passenger use, and are therefore no longer free for numbering. The plan is to classify trains in the 1000 range after the GI/1E series has been withdrawn.
