= Traktionssysteme Austria =

Traktionssysteme Austria GmbH
- Type: GmbH
- Industry: Mechanical engineering
- Founded: 29 June 2000
- Headquarters: Wiener Neudorf, Austria
- Key people: Robert Tencl; Harold Schmidt
- Products: Traction motors, gearboxes and drives, wheelset gearboxes, permanent magnet (PM) synchronous generators, asynchronous motors
- Revenue: <€120 million (2023)
- Number of employees: 690 (2023)
- Website: www.tsa.at

Traktionssysteme Austria GmbH (TSA) is an Austrian industrial company headquartered in Wiener Neudorf, Austria. The company is engaged in the development and production of electric traction motors, traction drives, and generators for rail and road commercial vehicles.

In the fiscal year 2023, the company achieved a revenue of nearly €120 million and employed 690 people within the TSA Group worldwide.

== History ==
=== Background ===
TSA's history began with the Österreichische Brown, Boveri Werke, an electronics company and subsidiary of Swiss Brown, Boveri & Cie. (BBC), with locations in Vienna and Steyr. After World War II, BBC restructured in Austria, leading to the establishment of a site in Wiener Neudorf in the 1950s and a new factory in the 1960s. This factory produced motors, generators, railway machines, transformers, and switchgear.

The site continued to be developed over the following years, initially within the corporate structure of Brown Boveri. After the merger of the Swedish Asea and the Swiss BBC in 1988, the company became part of the newly formed Asea Brown Boveri (ABB).

=== Foundation of TSA ===
In the late 1990s, Franz Hrachowitz, Günter Eichhübl, and Robert Tencl founded Trasys Beteiligungs- und Management GmbH with the aim of acquiring the ABB site in Austria. In June 2000, ABB sold the Austrian site to Trasys Beteiligungs- und Management GmbH as part of a management buyout, and the company was renamed Traktionssysteme Austria GmbH (TSA), with Eichhübl and Tencl as managing directors.

=== Growth and expansion ===
Over the years, the company developed DACS motors, convection-cooled traction motors, and products for trams, subways, and rapid transit systems. In 2009, TSA formed a joint venture in India, Medha Traction Equipment, with operations starting in Hyderabad in 2013. A manufacturing site in Bosnia and Herzegovina was established in 2010 and renamed Traktionssysteme Bosnia in 2013. In 2012, TSA founded Traction Systems Inc. in Somerville, New Jersey, supporting light rail projects in Phoenix, Seattle, and Silicon Valley. In 2019, Traction Systems was founded in Shanghai to manage procurement from China.

=== Recent developments ===
In 2020, Voith and the Swiss investment company PCS Holding acquired a majority stake in the company. In the same year, TSA invested around €1 million in optimizing rotor production, resulting in a reduction of lead times by over 50%. Between 2021 and 2024, TSA received orders for the delivery of motors for the Berlin subway, the Swiss Federal Railways, and for the production of traction generators for Plasser & Theurer. Additionally, TSA equipped the light rail system in Sydney with electric motors. In 2024, the headquarters was expanded with a logistics and assembly hall. This expansion is part of the development of a TSA City in Wiener Neudorf.

== Corporate structure ==
Traktionssysteme Austria GmbH is owned by the Swiss PCS Holding (48%), Voith (37%), and managing director Robert Tencl (15%). TSA employs around 1,000 people, with 690 within the TSA group and the remainder in the joint venture in India. The company's revenue for the fiscal year 2023 amounted to nearly €120 million.

=== Locations and subsidiaries ===
TSA has locations in Austria, Bosnia and Herzegovina, the US, China, and India. Its technologies are utilized in nearly 70 countries. TSA has the following subsidiaries:

- Medha Traction Equipment Pvt. Ltd. in Hyderabad, India (Joint Venture)
- Traktionssysteme Bosnia d.o.o. in Tuzla, Bosnia and Herzegovina
- Traction Systems Inc. in Somerville, New Jersey
- Traction Systems China in Shanghai, China

== Products and services ==
TSA produces traction motors, gearboxes, and drives for rail transport, including trams, subways, locomotives, and multiple units. Additionally, the company manufactures traction gearboxes and asynchronous motors commonly used in electric buses. TSA also develops permanent magnet (PM) synchronous generators for road transport.

=== Technology and research ===
To advance electromobility, TSA develops new cooling and insulation technologies, using modern materials and designing for higher operational speeds. Their DACS cooling concept (Double Air Cooling System) features both inner and outer air cooling circuits that efficiently manage heat exchange. TSA also developed the TSA-Dur insulation system, introduced in 2010. Furthermore, TSA is involved in research on linear motors and magnetic levitation technology for Hyperloop systems, aiming to transport people and goods at speeds of up to 1,000 km/h.

== Literature ==
- Stadler, Gerhard A.; Krebs, Marie (2020). Vom Industriestandort zum Innovationszentrum: 1960 bis 2020. Weitra: Verlag Bibliothek der Provinz. ISBN 978-3-99028-962-4.
