= Metropolis (disambiguation) =

A metropolis is a large city.

Metropolis may also refer to:

== Buildings ==
- 10 Dundas East or Metropolis, Ontario, Canada
- The Ascott Metropolis, a high-rise residential building in Auckland, New Zealand
- M Telus (concert hall) (formerly Métropolis), a concert hall in, Montreal, Quebec, Canada
- M-Towers or Metropolis Towers, Gżira, Malta
- Metropolis (Los Angeles), a high-rise residential complex in Los Angeles, U.S.
- Metropolis at Dadeland, Kendall, Florida, U.S.
- Metropolis at Metrotown, a shopping mall in British Columbia, Canada
- Metropolis Building, Madrid, an office building in Madrid, Spain
- Metropolis Fremantle, a performance venue in Fremantle, Western Australia
- Metropolis Theatre (Bronx, New York), U.S.

== Film and TV ==
- Metropolis (1927 film), by Fritz Lang
- Metropolis (2001 film), an anime film by Rintaro
- Metropolis (British TV series), a 2000 drama series
- Metropolis (American TV program), a 2015 travel guide documentary program
- Metropolis 2000: Scenes from New York, a concert film by Dream Theater
- Metropolis TV, a Dutch television program on life and cultures around the world
- Metropolis, a radio program hosted by Jason Bentley
- Metropolis, a fictional city in the TV series 21 Jump Street
- Metrópolis (Chile), defunct Chilean cable operator

== Literature ==
=== Comic books ===
- Metropolis (comics), a fictional American city in DC comics and home to Superman
- Captain Metropolis, a character in the Watchmen comics series
- Metropolis (manga), a 1949 manga by Osamu Tezuka
- Metropolis Collectibles, a comic book dealer of vintage American comics

=== Other literature ===
- Metropolis (novel), a novel by Thea von Harbou, written in tandem with the 1927 film
- Metropolis (architecture magazine)
- Metropolis (free magazine), a Japanese city guide
- The Metropolis, a 1908 novel by Upton Sinclair
- Metropolis, a 2019 crime novel by Philip Kerr

== Music ==
=== Albums ===
- Metropolis (Peter Cincotti album), or the title song
- Metropolis (Client album)
- Metropolis (FM album)
- Metropolis (Guccini album)
- Metropolis (Robby Maria album)
- Metropolis: The Chase Suite, a 2007 album by Janelle Monáe
- Metropolis (Jeff Mills album)
- Metropolis (Seigmen album), or the title song
- Metropolis (Sister Machine Gun album)
- Metropolis (Swords album)
- Metropolis, a Future Crew tribute album
- Metropolis (EP), a 2019 extended play by Kompany
- Metropolis Part I, a 2012 EP by The M Machine
- Metropolis Pt. 2: Scenes from a Memory, a 1999 album by Dream Theater

=== Songs ===
- "Metropolis" (The Church song)
- "Metropolis—Part I: "The Miracle and the Sleeper"", a song by Dream Theater from Images and Words
- "Metropolis", a song by L'Arc-en-Ciel from Winter Fall
- "Metropolis", a song by B12 from Electro-Soma
- "Metropolis", a song by Gareth Emery
- "Metropolis", a song by Faded Paper Figures from Dynamo
- "Metropolis", a song by David Guetta & Nicky Romero
- "Metropolis", a song by Kraftwerk from The Man-Machine
- "Metropolis", a song by Motörhead from Overkill
- "Metropolis", a song by Nash the Slash from Children of the Night
- "Metropolis", a song by Owl City from The Midsummer Station
- "Metropolis", a song by The Pogues from If I Should Fall From Grace With God
- "Metropolis", a song by Pseudo Echo from Race
- "Metropolis", a song by Scooter from Under the Radar Over the Top
- "Metropolis", a song by The Vision Bleak from The Deathship Has a New Captain
- "Metropolis", a song by Zion I from Mind Over Matter

=== Other musical works ===
- Metropolis (musical), a 1989 stage adaptation of the 1927 film
- Metropolis Symphony (1988–93), a symphonic work by Michael Daugherty
- Metropolis: a Fantasy in Blue, a 1928 composition by Ferde Grofé

=== Bands ===
- Metropolis (band), a German 1970s progressive rock band, or their 1974 eponymous album
- Metropolis (barbershop quartet), a singing group from the US
- Metropolis, stage name of one of the members of Foreign Beggars
- Strange Advance, a 1980s Canadian New Wave band changed its name from Metropolis because of the existence of the German band

=== Recording and related media ===
- Armstrong Studios, former recording studios in Melbourne, Australia, renamed Metropolis Studios for some of its existence
- Metropolis Group, holding company for Metropolis Studios, a recording studio in London
- Metropolis International, a predominantly UK-based media and technology group
- Metropolis Records, a record label in Philadelphia
- Metropolis Records (Serbia), a record label in Belgrade

== Other arts and media ==
- Metropolis (Grosz), a 1916-1917 painting by George Grosz
- Metropolis (Dix), a 1928 painting by Otto Dix
- Metropolis Asia, an annual arts festival held in Guwahati, India
- Metropolis Performing Arts Centre, a professional theatre company in Arlington Heights, Illinois

== Places ==
- Metropolis (Acarnania), a classical city in Acarnania, western Greece
- Metropolis (Amphilochia), a classical city in Amphilochia, western Greece
- Metropolis (Anatolia), a classical city in western Turkey
- Metropolis (Doris), a classical city in Doris, Greece
- Metropolis (Euboea), a classical city in Euboea, Greece
- Metropolis (Perrhaebia), a classical city in Thessaly, Greece
- Metropolis (northern Phrygia), a classical city in Asia Minor
- Metropolis (southern Phrygia), a classical city in Asia Minor
- Metropolis (Sarmatia), a classical city in Ukraine
- Metropolis (Thessaly), a classical city in Thessaly, Greece
- Metropolis (Troad), a classical city in Asia Minor
- Metropolis, Illinois, a city in Massac County, Illinois, US
- Metropolis, Nevada, a ghost town in Elko County, Nevada, US
- Metropolis in Asia, a Roman era city in what is today Tratsa, Turkey
- Metropolis GZM, a metropolitan unit in the Silesian Voivodeship of Poland
- Metropolis of Lyon, a French territorial collectivity
- Metropolis, a nickname of New York City
- The Metropolis, an administrative region that was a precursor to the County of London
- KL Metropolis, a mixed development project in Kuala Lumpur, Malaysia

== Other uses ==
- Alstom Metropolis, a type of metro train
- City New South Wales rugby league team or Metropolis
- Metropolis (religious jurisdiction) or episcopal see, the seat of a (metropolitan) bishop
- Metropolis (surname)
- Metropolis Coffee Company, a specialty coffee company in Chicago, Illinois
- Metropolis in France, a form of intercommunality in France
- Metropolis Lab, an Indian multinational chain of diagnostic companies
- Metropolis Ltd, an American game company
- Metropolis Project, a research network studying human migration
- Metropolis RFC, an American rugby team based in Minneapolis
- Metropolis Technologies, a parking company based in Santa Monica
- Palantir Metropolis, a business software product
- Metropolis Zone, a level in Sonic the Hedgehog 2

== See also ==
- Colonies in antiquity
- Metro (disambiguation)
- Metropol (disambiguation)
- Metropolis Film Awards, awards given by the German Directors Guild
- Metropolis Rescore, a 2005 soundtrack album to the 1927 silent film by The New Pollutants
- Metropolis–Hastings algorithm, a statistical method
- Metropolitan (disambiguation)
- mTropolis, a multimedia programming application
