= Metropolitan =

Metropolitan may refer to:

== Areas and governance (secular and ecclesiastical) ==
- Metropolitan archdiocese, the jurisdiction of a metropolitan archbishop
  - Metropolitan bishop or archbishop, leader of an ecclesiastical "mother see"
- Metropolitan area, a region consisting of a densely populated urban core and its surrounding territories
- Metropolitan borough, a form of local government district in England, United Kingdom
- Metropolitan county, a type of county-level administrative division of England, United Kingdom
- Metropolitan Corporation (Pakistan), a local government authority in Pakistan

== Businesses ==
- Metro-Cammell, a British manufacturer of railway stock
- Metropolitan Books, an imprint of Henry Holt and Company
- Metropolitan Stores, a Canadian former department store chain
- Metropolitan-Vickers, a British heavy electrical engineering company

== Colleges and universities ==
- Metropolitan University, Sylhet, Bangladesh
- Metropolitan University Prague, Czech Republic
- Metropolitan University College, Denmark
- Metropolitan University (Puerto Rico)
- Metropolitan University (Belgrade), Serbia
- Metropolitan Community College (Omaha), United States
- Metropolitan State University of Denver, United States
  - Metro State Roadrunners
- Metropolitan State University, Saint Paul, Minnesota, United States

== Film ==
- Metropolitan (1935 film), a film by Richard Boleslawski
- Metropolitan (1939 film), a French thriller film directed by Maurice Cam
- Metropolitan (1990 film), a film by Whit Stillman

== Literature ==
- The Metropolitan (newspaper), the college newspaper of Metropolitan State University of Denver
- Metropolitan (novel), a fantasy novel by Walter Jon Williams
- The Metropolitan Magazine, a publication from London
- Metropolitan Magazine (New York City), a literary magazine
- Seattle Metropolitan, a local-interest magazine published in Seattle, Washington

== Music ==
- Metropolitan (band), an indie rock group from Washington, D.C.
- "Metropolitan", a song by Nemo

== Transport ==
=== Transit systems ===
- Metropolitan (train), a discontinued German train service between Cologne and Hamburg
- Metropolitan line, a London Underground route

=== Vehicles ===
- Convair Metropolitan, an airliner
- Metropolitan, a named train of the Pennsylvania Railroad, from New York City to St. Louis
- Metropolitan Special, a named train of the Baltimore and Ohio Railroad, from Jersey City to St. Louis
- Nash Metropolitan, an automobile
- Scania Metropolitan, a double-decker bus

== Venues ==
- Metropolitan (bar), a gay bar in New York City
- Metropolitan Museum of Art, in New York
- Metropolitan Opera, in New York
- Metropolitan Theatre (disambiguation), several venues
- Teatro Metropólitan, in Mexico City

== Other uses ==
- Metropolitan (cocktail), a variation of the Brandy Manhattan
- Metropolitan area network, a city-spanning computer network
- Metropolitan Division, a division in the National Hockey League
- Metropolitan Police Service, the police force of Greater London, England
- New York Metropolitans, 19th century baseball team

== See also ==
- Met (disambiguation)
- Metro (disambiguation)
- Metropol (disambiguation)
- Metropole, "mother country", or central part of a colonizing state
- Metropolis, a large city or conurbation
- Metropolis (disambiguation)
- The Metropolitan (disambiguation)
- Metropolitan Bank (disambiguation)
- Metropolitan Building (disambiguation)
- Metropolitan France, the part of France in Europe
- Metropolitan Magazine (disambiguation)
- Metropolitan Opera House (disambiguation)
- Metropolitan Police (disambiguation)
- Moscow Metro (Russian: Московский метрополитен), a rapid transit system in Moscow, Russia
- Paris Metro (French: Métropolitain), a rapid transit system in Paris, France
- Rapid transit system, in an urban area
- Transmetropolitan, a comic book series
