= The Metropolitan =

The Metropolitan may refer to:

== Buildings ==
- The Metropolitan (Atlanta condominium building), United States
- The Metropolitan (Rochester, New York), a skyscraper in the United States, formerly Chase Tower
- Metropolitan Hotel (disambiguation)
- Metropolitan Theatre (disambiguation)

== Other uses ==
- The Metropolitan (ATC), an Australia horse race
- Metropolitan Handicap, an American horse race
- The Metropolitan (newspaper), of Metropolitan State College of Denver, US

== See also ==
- Metropolitan (disambiguation)
