= Welcome to My Secret Heart =

Studio album by Robby Maria
- Released: 10 October 2014
- Recorded: January–February 2014
- Studio: Funkhaus (Berlin, Germany)
- Genre: singer-songwriter, indie
- Length: 37:06
- Label: Timezone
- Producer: Robby Maria

Robby Maria chronology
Metropolis (2013)	Welcome to My Secret Heart (2014)

Welcome to My Secret Heart is the second studio album by Robby Maria and was released on October 10, 2014. All songs were recorded between January and February 2014 at the Funkhaus in Berlin, studios in operation at the time of the German Democratic Republic.

Maria was influenced by musicians from various European countries and Canada in order to create a sound different to his previous releases. The first single from the album, "Sick Young Man", was published on September 19, 2014, alongside a video shot by German filmmaker Stephan Metzner.

== Track listing ==
1. "Welcome to the Suicide Days" – 2:36
2. "Sick Young Man" – 3:07
3. "Miracle Man" – 3:23
4. "Not for Anyone" – 1:47
5. "No Heroes" – 3:05
6. "Neverland" – 2:59
7. "October Winds" – 2:22
8. "The New Hope Song" – 2:57
9. "Pan's Journey" – 3:26
10. "The Game" – 2:38
11. "Killing Myself to Live" – 2:54
12. "On a Lonely Day" – 2:02
13. "Message from the Silent Sun" – 2:25

== Personnel ==
- Anni Müller – drums, percussions
- Meike Jürgens – vocals
- Iza Höll – vocals
- Franz Bauer – marimba
- Stephan Metzner – solo guitar
- Tanya Bartels – saxophone
- Tanja Hutterer – piano

== Reception ==
Phil Dunn of the British magazine On the Scout wrote: "...I would love to hear more from this man, who not only entertained, but also mesmerized me for almost 40 minutes.".

Magda Wiezcorek of the Polish music magazine Muzykanowy wrote: "...Welcome To My Secret Heart is not just another singer-songwriter album, but a real chance to experience an authentic piece of originality."
