= Metropol =

Metropol or Metropole may refer to:

== Places ==
- Metropol (Berlin), a concert hall
- Metropole Cafe, a New York City jazz club
- Metropol Theater (disambiguation)
- Metropole, a tango jazz album by Artango
- Hotel Metropol (disambiguation), various hotels
- Minto Metropole, a building in Ottawa, Canada
- Metropolitan University College, a university college in Denmark whose native name is Professionshøjskolen Metropol

== Music ==
- Metropole, a 1949 musical directed by George S. Kaufman
- Metropol (album), 1997 album by UK group Lunatic Calm
- Metropole (album), a 2014 album by The Lawrence Arms
- Metropole, a 2006 album by Mike Barone Big Band
- Metropole Orkest, a jazz and pop orchestra based in the Netherlands

== Other ==
- Metropole, the homeland or central territory of a colonial empire
- Métropole, a type of administrative entity in France
- Esporte Clube Metropol, a Brazilian football team
- Metropol TV, a Norwegian television channel
- Metropol, a font designed by Aldo Novarese (1967)
- Metropol, a comic by writer and artist Ted McKeever (Epic Comics, 1991–1992)
- Metropole, the English name of 1970 Hungarian novel Epepe by Ferenc Karinthy
- Metrópoles, Brazilian news outlet
- Metropol' Soviet literary almanac published in Samizdat (1978)

== See also ==
- Metropolis (disambiguation)
- Metropolitan (disambiguation)
- Metro (disambiguation)
