= Hotel Metropol =

Hotel Metropol or Hotel Metropole may refer to:

== United Kingdom ==
- Hotel Metropole, Leeds
- Hilton Birmingham Metropole, the largest hotel in England outside London
- Hilton Brighton Metropole, a 4-star hotel and conference centre located on the seafront in Brighton, East Sussex
- Hilton London Metropole
- Metropole Hotel, London

== United States ==
- Hotel Metropole (New York City), the first hotel in New York City that had running water in every room
- Hotel Metropole (Cincinnati, Ohio)
- Hotel Metropole (Santa Cruz, California), built in 1908, added to the National Register of Historical Places in 1979, demolished after being severely damaged in the 1989 Loma Prieta earthquake

== Other places ==
- Hotel Metropol Moscow
- Hotel Metropole, Brussels, built in 1895, the only 19th-century hotel in Brussels still in operation today
- Hotel Metropole, Dublin, a former landmark closed in 1972
- Hotel Métropole Geneva, a hotel in Geneva, Switzerland, opened in 1854
- Hotel Metropole, Ipswich, a heritage-listed hotel in Queensland, Australia
- Hotel Metropole, Monte Carlo, built in 1886
- Hotel Metropole, Sydney, a former hotel in Sydney, Australia from 1890 to 1970
- Hotel Metropole, Vienna, a hotel in Vienna, Austria, constructed in 1871–73 and destroyed during World War II after serving as the headquarters of the Gestapo from 1938, with the address Morzinplatz, in the I. District Innere Stadt
- Metropol Palace Hotel Belgrade, formerly known as Hotel Metropol, one of Belgrade's architectural monuments, opened in 1957 on Bulevar Kralja Aleksandra, the longest street in the urban part of the city, designed by Serbian architect Dragiša Brašovan
- Metropole Hotel (Nainital), a defunct heritage hotel
- Hotel Metropole, Karachi, an iconic defunct hotel in Karachi, Pakistan
- Sofitel Legend Metropole Hanoi, a 5-star historic luxury hotel opened in 1901 in the French colonial style
- Theatre Royal and Metropole Hotel, former theatre and hotel in Perth, Western Australia

== See also ==
- Metropol (disambiguation)
