= Metro Theatre =

Metro Theatre may refer to:

- Metro Theater (New York City), New York, United States
- Metro Theatre (San Francisco, California), United States
- Metro Theatre (Toronto), Ontario, Canada
- Metro Theatre (Vancouver), British Columbia, Canada
- Metro Theatre, Sydney, New South Wales, Australia
- Metro Arts Theatre, Queensland, Australia

== See also ==
- Metropolitan Theatre (disambiguation)
