= Metropolitan Building =

Metropolitan Building may refer to:

- Metropolitan Building (Detroit)
- Metropolitan Building (Kolkata)
- Metropolitan Buildings Office
- Metropolitan Building (Minneapolis)
- Metropolitan Building (Los Angeles)

== See also ==
- Metropolitan Annex, Los Angeles
- The Metropolitan (Rochester)
- Metropolitan Theatre (disambiguation)
