= Metropolis Theatre =

Metropolis Theatre may refer to:

- Metropolis Theatre (Bronx, New York)
- Metropolis Theatre (Montreal), site where Joe Satriani's Satchurated: Live in Montreal was recorded

== See also ==
- Metropol Theater (disambiguation)
