= 44 Montgomery =

Office building in San Francisco

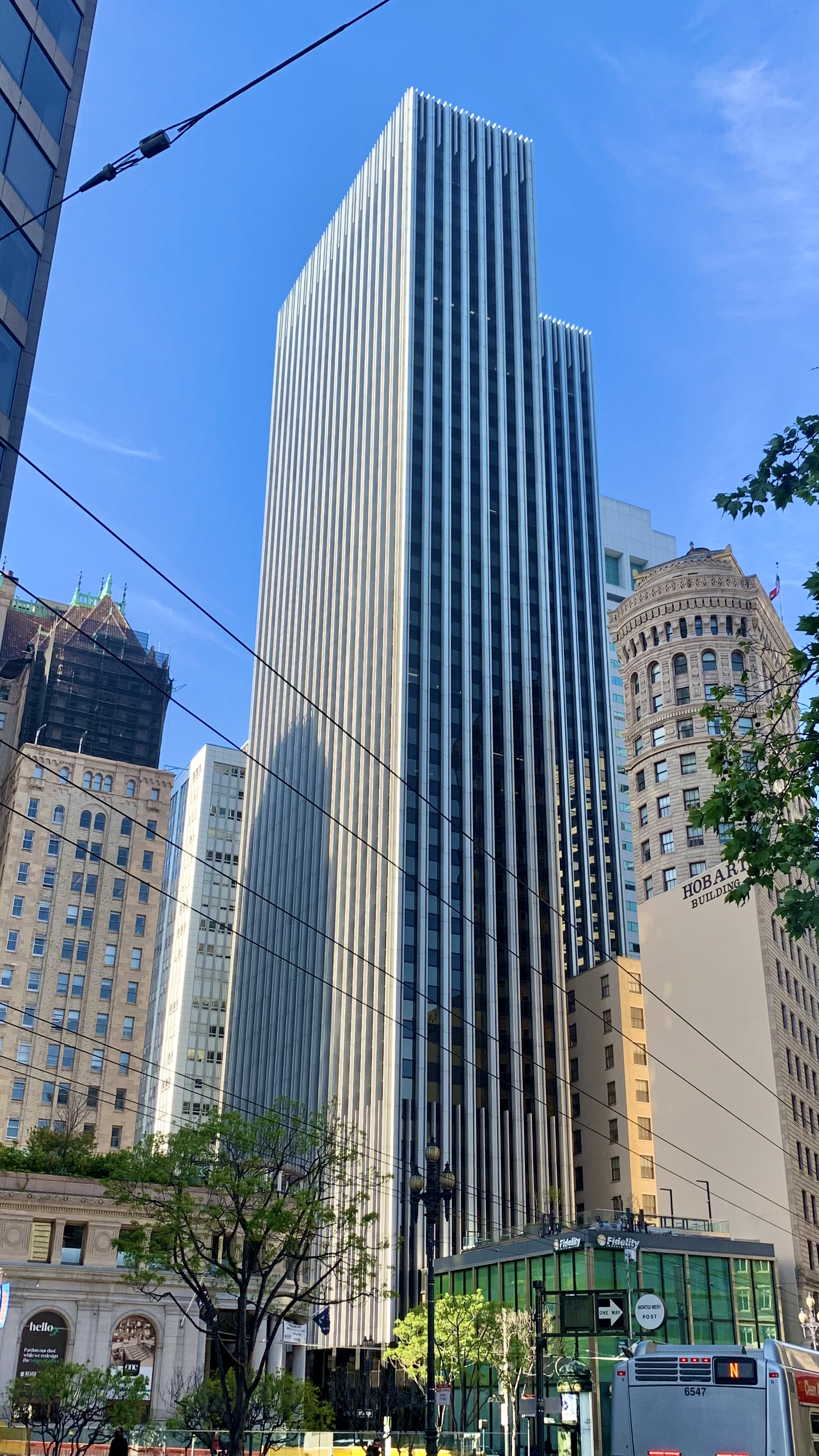
- In 2021

- Location within San Francisco

Record height
- Preceded by: Hartford Building
- Surpassed by: Bank of America Center

General information
- Status: Completed
- Type: Commercial offices
- Location: 44 Montgomery Street; San Francisco, California
- Coordinates: 37.7898°N 122.4018°W
- Construction started: 1964
- Completed: 1967
- Management: Seagate Properties

Height
- Antenna spire: 180.7 m (593 ft)
- Roof: 172.2 m (565 ft)

Technical details
- Floor count: 43
- Floor area: 760,524 sq ft (70,655.0 m^{2})
- Lifts/elevators: 18

Design and construction
- Architect: John Graham & Company
- Main contractor: Dillingham Construction; Haas & Haynie

44 Montgomery is a 43-story, 172 m (564 ft) office skyscraper in the heart of San Francisco's Financial District. Groundbreaking was in the spring of 1964. When completed in 1967, it was the tallest building west of Dallas, surpassed by 555 California Street (built as the world headquarters of Bank of America) in 1969. The building was designed, built and dedicated for Wells Fargo Bank, and their IT subsidiary was based there at one time (the bank's headquarters are at 464 California Street).

44 Montgomery, as part of the original design anticipating the then-under-construction Bay Area Rapid Transit subway system, contains direct underground access to the Montgomery Street Station.

== History ==
The State Teachers Retirement System of Ohio purchased the building from AT&T in 1997 for $111 million. In 2017, Beacon Capital purchased it for $473 million.

== Tenants ==
- U.S. Securities and Exchange Commission
- Locke Lord
- Alpha Omega Financial Systems
- AppleOne Employment Services
- Armanino LLP
- Invest Northern Ireland
- Northwestern University
- Signature Consultants
- Seagate Properties, Inc.
- Landrum & Brown
- RSM US LLP
- ContractPodAi

== See also ==
- List of tallest buildings in San Francisco
