= 555 California Street =

52-story skyscraper in San Francisco

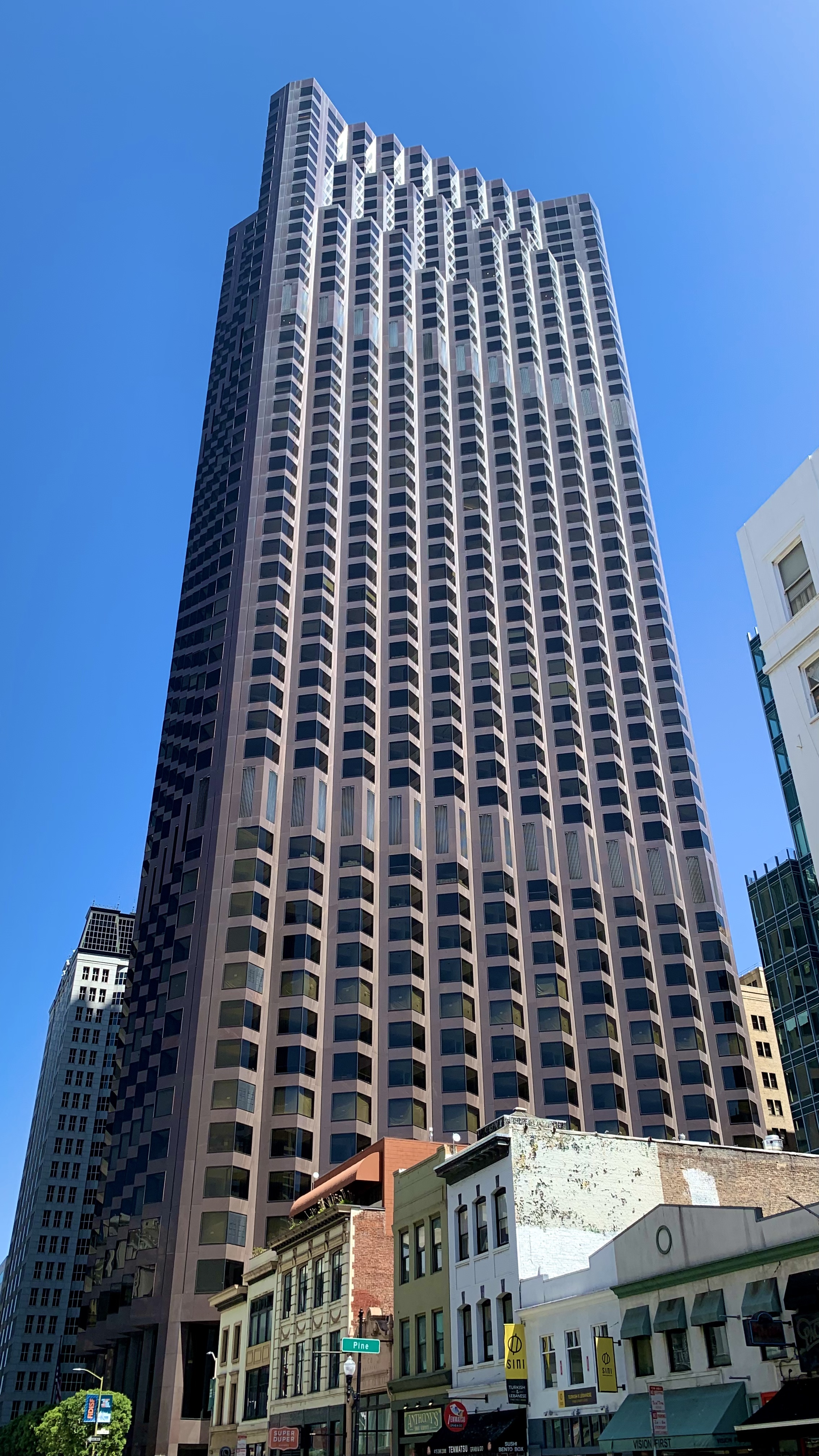
- The building in 2021

- Location within San Francisco Location within California Location within the United States
- Former names: Bank of America Center

Record height
- Tallest in San Francisco from 1969 to 1972^{[I]}
- Preceded by: 44 Montgomery
- Surpassed by: Transamerica Pyramid

General information
- Status: Completed
- Type: Commercial offices
- Location: 555 California Street; San Francisco, California
- Coordinates: 37.7919°N 122.4038°W
- Elevation: 35 ft (11 m)
- Completed: 1969
- Owner: Vornado Realty Trust (70%); The Trump Organization (30%)
- Operator: HWA 555 Owners LLC

Height
- Roof: 779 ft (237 m)

Technical details
- Floor count: 52; 4 below ground
- Floor area: 1,969,979 sq ft (183,017.0 m^{2})
- Lifts/elevators: 38

Design and construction
- Architects: Skidmore, Owings and Merrill; Wurster, Benardi and Emmons
- Developer: HWA 555 Owners LLC
- Structural engineer: H. J. Brunnier Associates
- Main contractor: Dinwiddie Construction

555 California Street, formerly Bank of America Center, is a 52-story 779 ft (237 m) skyscraper in San Francisco, California. It is the fourth tallest building in the city as of February 2021, and in 2013 was the largest by floor area. Completed in 1969, the tower was the tallest building west of the Mississippi River until the completion of the Transamerica Pyramid in 1972, and the world headquarters of Bank of America until the 1998 merger with NationsBank, when the company moved its headquarters to the Bank of America Corporate Center in Charlotte, North Carolina. It is currently owned by Vornado Realty Trust and The Trump Organization.

== Background ==
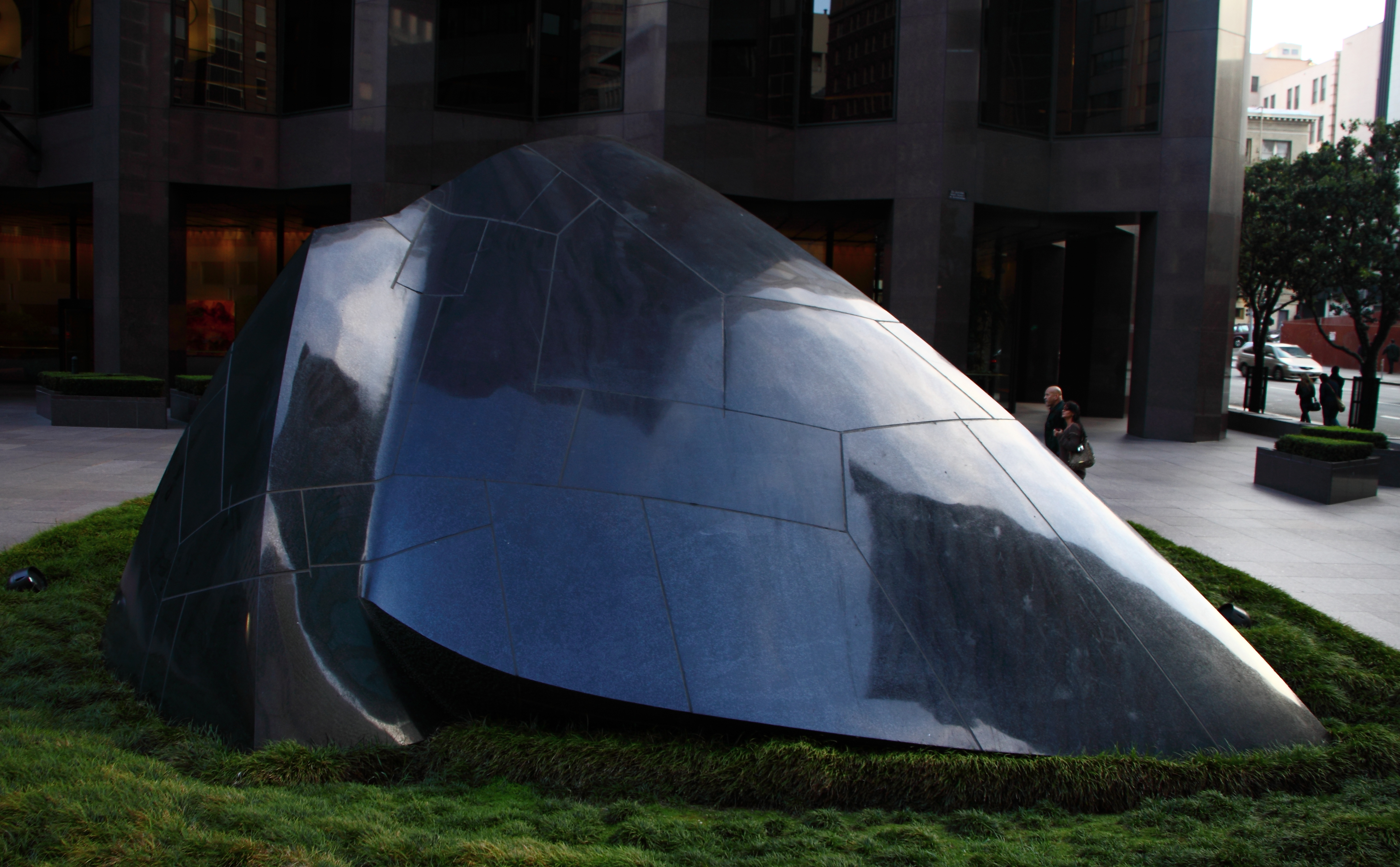
Masayuki Nagare's sculpture Transcendence, locally referred to as Banker's Heart

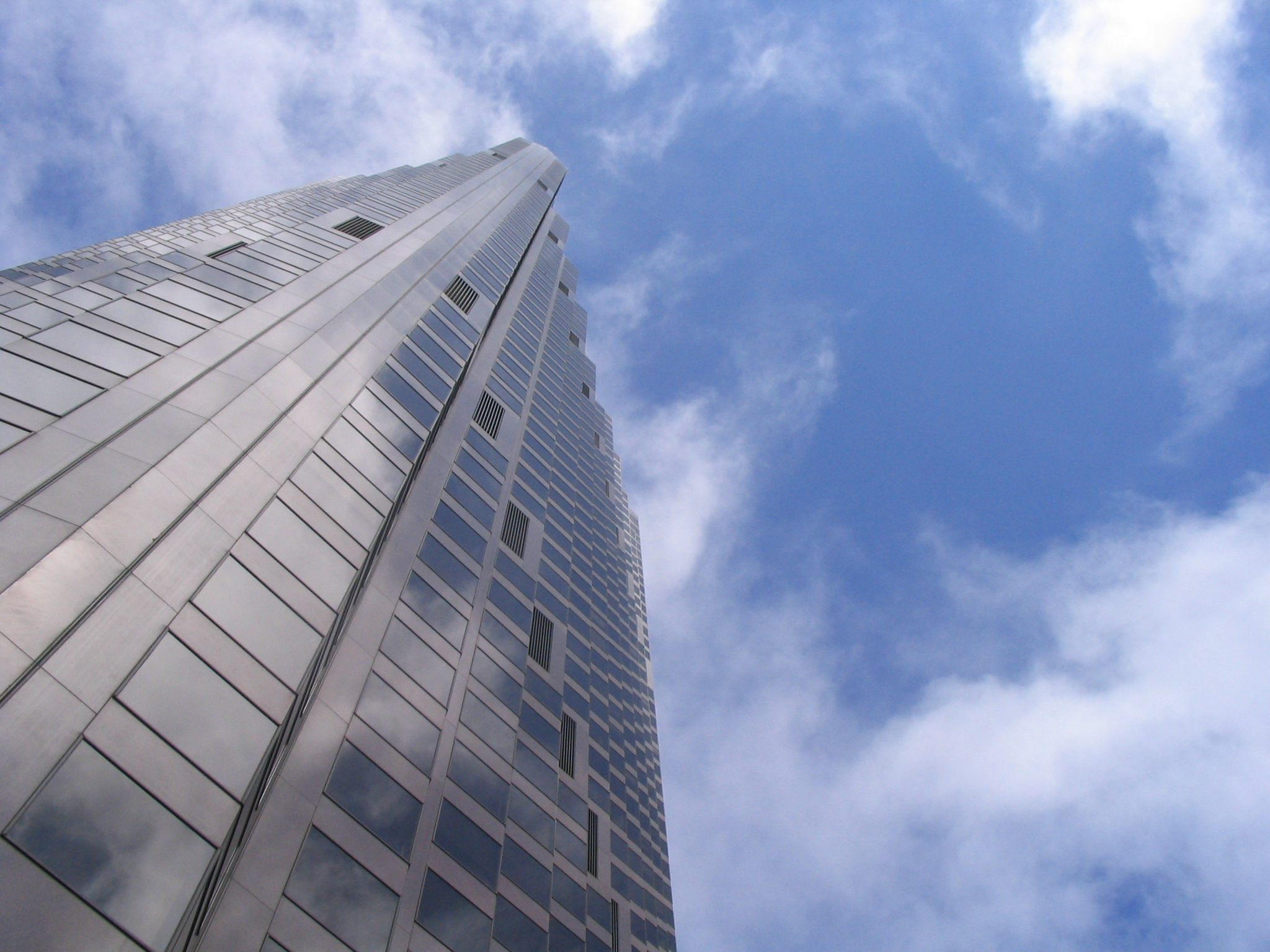
555 California Street from street level

Colloquially known as "Triple Five" and/or "Triple Nickel", 555 California Street was meant to display the wealth, power, and importance of Bank of America. Design was by Wurster, Bernardi and Emmons and Skidmore, Owings and Merrill, with architect Pietro Belluschi consulting; structural engineering was by the San Francisco firm H. J. Brunnier Associates. It is the 75th tallest building in the United States, one foot taller than One Worldwide Plaza in New York City and just 1 foot shorter than the 68th tallest building in the US, which is also owned by Bank of America, the Bank of America Center in Houston, Texas at 780 ft (238 m), and just 2 feet shorter than the 67th tallest building in the US, 30 Hudson Street in Jersey City, New Jersey at 781 ft (238 m). Some sites round the heights of all four buildings to 780 ft (238 m) making those four buildings tied as the 67th tallest buildings in the country. As of February 2021, 555 California Street is the 89th tallest building in the United States, and the 103rd tallest in North America.

The skyscraper has thousands of bay windows, meant to improve the rental value and to symbolize the bay windows common in San Francisco residential real estate. The irregular cutout areas near the top of the building were designed to suggest the Sierra Nevada. At the north side of the skyscraper is a broad plaza named in honor of Bank of America founder A.P. Giannini.

In the plaza the 200-ton black Swedish granite sculpture "Transcendence" by Masayuki Nagare is known as the "Banker's Heart". Nearly the entire block—the skyscraper, the banking hall, the plaza, the stairways, and the sidewalks—is clad in costly polished or rough carnelian granite. A restaurant, the "Carnelian Room," was on the 52nd floor. The elevator to this restaurant is one of the few publicly accessible high-speed elevators in San Francisco. The restaurant closed at midnight New Year's Eve 2009.

The southeast corner of California and Kearny is about 35 feet (11 m) above sea level, so the top of the building is over 800 feet (240 m). With the Transamerica Pyramid, 555 California Street shows the direction San Francisco's downtown was moving during the 1960s before campaigns against high-rise buildings in the 1970s and 1980s forced development to move south of Market Street. With its top spire, the Transamerica Pyramid is taller, but 555 California has the higher habitable space.

In April 2018, the United States Geological Survey included 555 California Street in a list of 39 high-rise buildings in San Francisco constructed during a period when welding techniques were employed that may jeopardize structural integrity during a strong earthquake.

A 70 percent interest was acquired by Vornado Realty Trust from foreign investors in March 2007 with a 30 percent limited partnership interest still owned by The Trump Organization In 2019, the building generated $86 million in net operating income ($60 million going to Vornado and $26 million to Trump Organization), and it had $543 million of debt attached to it in 2020. Trump's stake in 555 California Street is one of his largest holdings as of 2020. Forbes estimated in 2020 that Trump owes $162 million to an unknown creditor for this object alone; the loan comes due in 2021. At least one tenant in this building whose rent benefits Trump, the Qatar Investment Authority, is an empty office as of 2020. On May 19, 2021, Trump announced that a $1.2B loan had closed on the property at an interest rate of 2% annualized.

== Major tenants ==
- AllianceBernstein
- Bank of America
- Bank of India
- Qatar Investment Authority

== In popular culture ==
Since its opening 57 years ago in 1969, the building has been purportedly haunted with unexplained activity throughout, such as moving cold air spots, landline phones lifting the receivers by themselves, and files and paperwork flying off shelves.

In 1971, the building appeared at the beginning of the film Dirty Harry, where it is the roof from which Scorpio snipes a woman in the now-closed swimming pool atop the Holiday Inn Chinatown (now Hilton Financial District hotel) on Kearny Street. The film shows panoramic views of the city from the roof; the building can be seen under construction in the 1968 film Bullitt.

In 1974, it was again used for a box-office hit, this time in Irwin Allen's blockbuster The Towering Inferno, in which the outside plaza substituted for that of the film's Glass Tower, which catches fire on the night of its dedication. Many scenes were also filmed in the interior ground-floor lobby. The granite stairs coming up from California Street to the A.P. Giannini plaza were used for several key specific scenes: the opening dedication ceremony, the arrival of fire trucks, and the final scene on the steps with Paul Newman, Steve McQueen, and Faye Dunaway.

The rooftop setting used in Dirty Harry was also used a decade later in the Chuck Norris film An Eye for an Eye (1981). The building is featured as a landmark in the 2003 video game SimCity 4, under its previous name. In Godzilla (2014 film), 555 California Street can be seen during the climactic battle between Godzilla and the MUTOs, with the skyscraper taking damage when the female MUTO is pushed into it by Godzilla's atomic breath. It also appears in the 2015 film San Andreas, as the "Riddick" skyscraper.

On January 1st 2019 Lego released model #21043 as part of the Lego Architecture Skyline series. The 565 piece model features 555 California Ave in addition to other notable San Francisco landmarks such as the Transamerica Pyramid and the Golden Gate Bridge. The model was retired December 31st, 2021.

== See also ==
- List of tallest buildings in San Francisco
- List of tallest buildings in the United States

Records
Preceded by First National Bank Tower	Tallest building in the United States west of Mississippi River; 1969–1972	Succeeded by Transamerica Pyramid
