= John Graham & Company =

Defunct American architectural firm

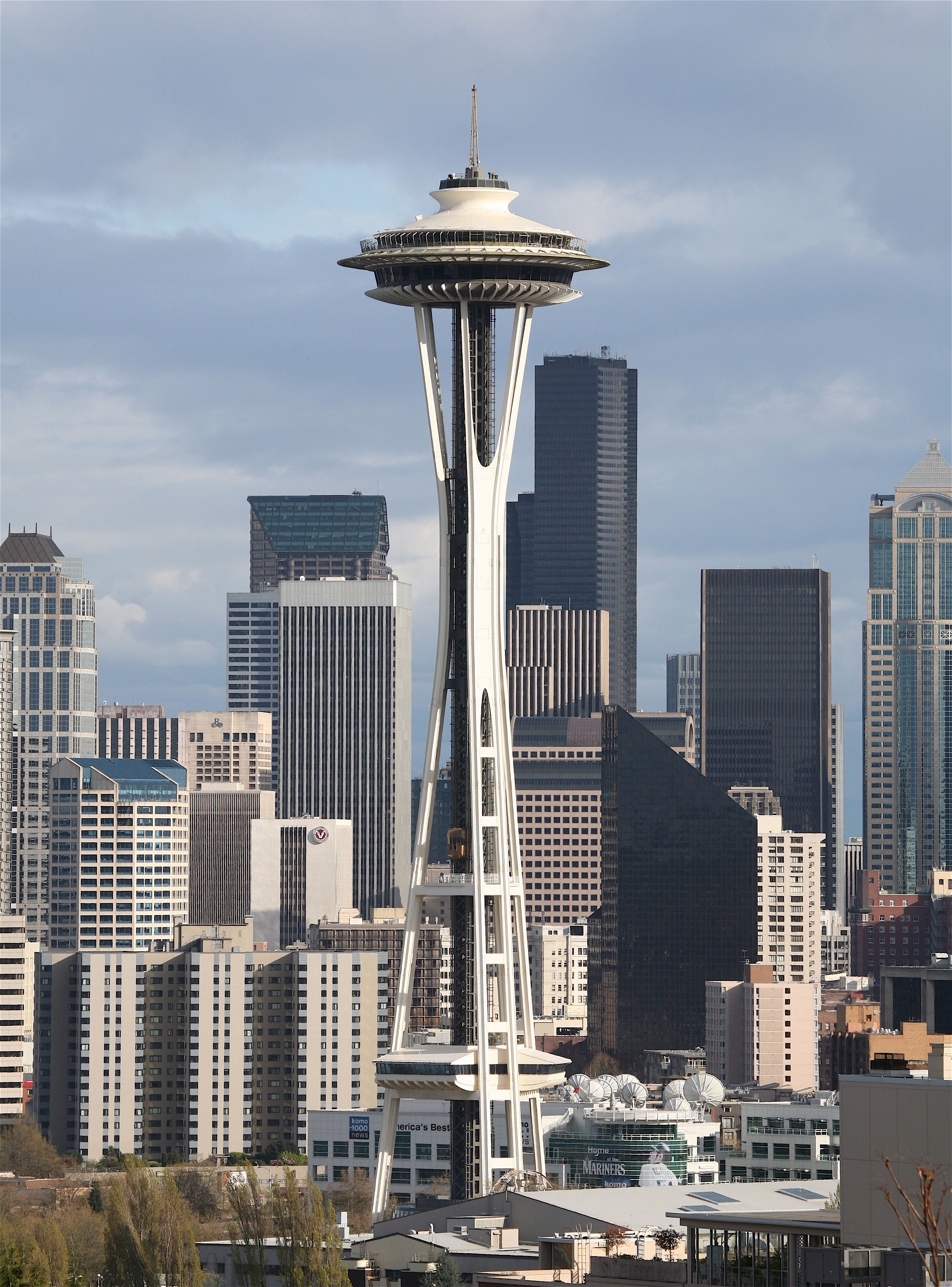
Space Needle, Seattle

John Graham & Company, or John Graham & Associates, was an architectural firm, founded in 1900 in Seattle, Washington, by English-born architect John Graham (1873–1955), and maintained by his son John Graham Jr. (1908–1991).

The firm was responsible for many Seattle landmarks and a number of significant structures nationwide, including the Space Needle, Chase Tower of Rochester, New York, and the Westin Seattle.

The firm was merged into the DLR Group on May 19, 1986, and the name saw full deletion in 1998.

== John Graham ==
John Graham was born in Liverpool, England, in 1873. He apprenticed as an architect in England as a young man. First visiting Seattle, Washington, in 1896, he immigrated to the United States in 1900, starting a one-man architectural practice in Seattle. He started off modestly, designing mainly industrial-related buildings and private residences. His first notable project was designing the reconstruction of the Trinity Parish Church at Eight Avenue and James Street in 1902 after it had been damaged by fire.

After a brief partnership with Alfred Bodley in 1904, Graham founded the firm of Graham & Myers with David J. Myers in 1906. He would work with Myers until 1910. As architect for the Ford Motor Company, he designed more than 30 of Ford's assembly plants between 1912 and 1940. Throughout the 1920s and 30s, he would design hundreds of commercial and public buildings in the Seattle area including the Frederick & Nelson store (now Nordstrom) in 1916. He also helped found the Seattle Yacht Club and designed all of their original facilities.

He retired from architecture in 1945 and died on March 20, 1955, while on tour in Hong Kong.

== John Graham Jr. ==
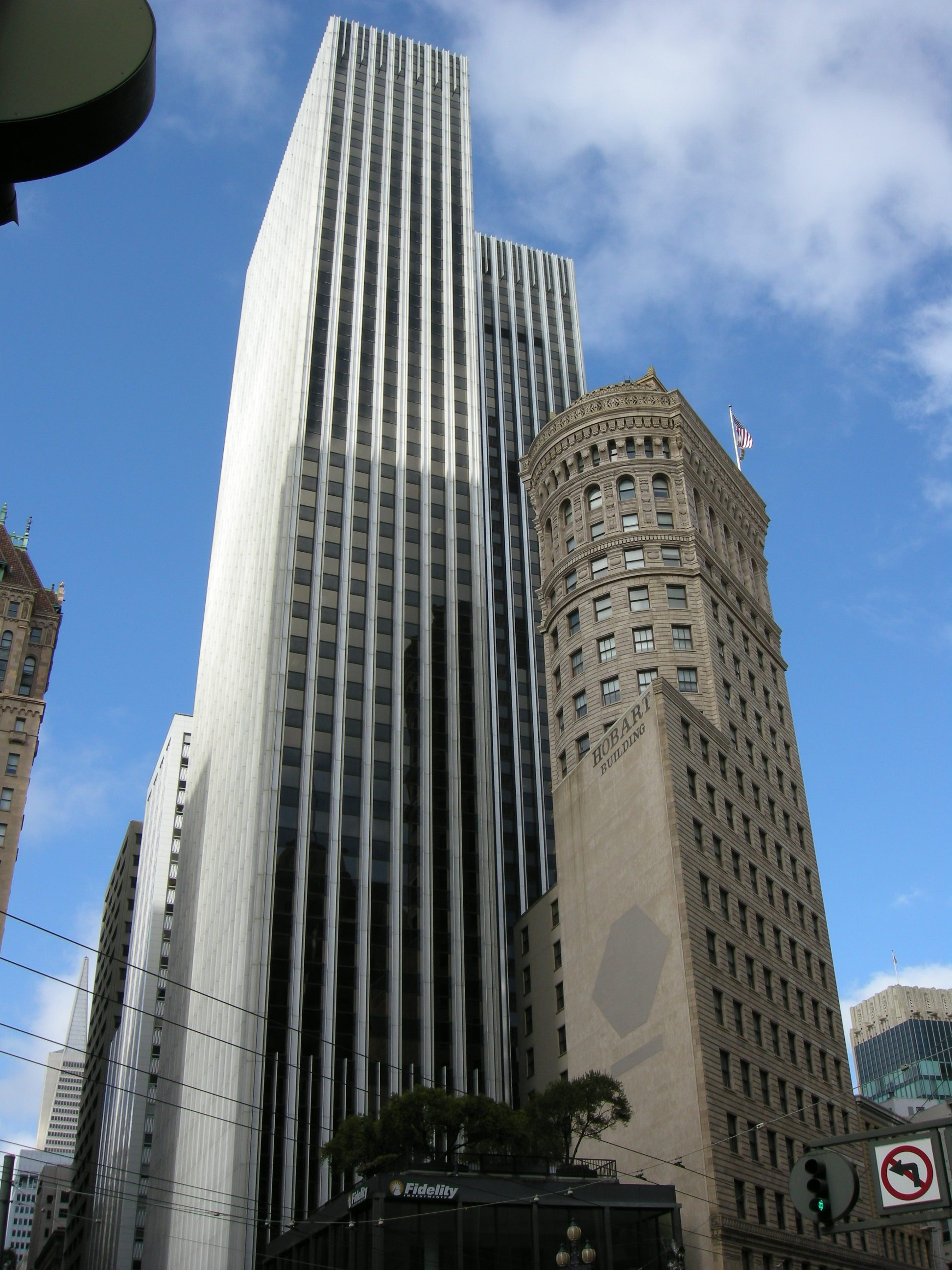
44 Montgomery (left), adjacent to the Hobart Building, San Francisco

John Graham Jr. (1908–91) was born and raised in Seattle, Washington. After graduating from Yale University, he established a short-lived satellite office of his father's firm in New York City in 1937, and took over the main office in 1946. Renaming the firm to John Graham & Company, the firm expanded a relatively modest regional practice to an office with national presence. It was ultimately responsible for over a thousand commissions.

Their primary focus was commercial projects. Many were straightforward mid-century modernist office towers, such as San Francisco's 1967 44 Montgomery tower. But Graham was also responsible for early development of the enclosed shopping mall genre, notably Seattle's Northgate Shopping Center, which opened April 21, 1950, which anticipates the better-known Northland Center in Detroit by four years. The firm would go on to design seventy malls nationwide.

The authorship of Graham's single most prominent work, the Space Needle, is disputed. Both Graham's office and the Seattle architect Victor Steinbrueck, a consultant on the project, claimed design credit; the design was also influenced by the Century 21 Exposition design standards and aerospace theme established by supervising architect Paul Thiry. Clearly the revolving restaurant, the "Eye of the Needle", was Graham's conception. He'd already devised "La Ronde" for the Ala Moana Shopping Center in Honolulu in 1961, and was awarded a patent for the idea in 1964.

Graham died in Seattle on January 29, 1991.

== Prewar work ==
The following structures are in Seattle unless otherwise noted:

- reconstruction of the Trinity Episcopal Parish Church, circa 1903
- Butterworth Building, 1903
- Pierre P. Ferry House, 1903–1906
- Joshua Green Building, 10 floors, 1910
- Bellingham National Bank Building, Bellingham, Washington, 1912–1913, with F. Stanley Piper
- Securities Building, 10 floors, 1918
- Frederick & Nelson, now the Nordstrom flagship store, 10 floors, 1918
- Dexter Horton Building, 14 floors, 1924
- Bank of California Building (Seattle), 3 floors, 1924
- Villa Academy, formerly Sacred Heart Orphanage, 1924
- Washington Building, 17 floors, 1925
- John Winthrop, 5 floors, 1925
- Montague & McHugh Building, Bellingham, Washington, 5 floors, 1927
- Hotel Georgia, 12 floors, 1927
- The Bon Marché flagship store, now Amazon.com, 7 floors, 1928
- UW Physics Building (now Mary Gates Hall), 1928
- The Roosevelt, 20 floors, 1929
- Joseph Vance Building, 14 floors, 1929
- Hartford Building, 1929
- U.S. Marine Hospital, now the Pacific Medical Center, with Bebb and Gould, 1930
- Exchange Building, 22 floors, 1930
- Tacoma Municipal Building (Medical Arts Building), 17 floors, 1931
- St. Edward Seminary, Kenmore, Washington, 80,000 square feet, 1931

== Postwar work ==
The Ilikai, Honolulu

- The Decatur, Seattle, residential building, 13 floors, 1950
- Northgate Mall, 1950
- Gulfgate Mall, Houston, 1956
- Northshore Mall, Peabody, Massachusetts, 1957
- AIA Building, 12 floors, 1958
- Ala Moana Office Building, Honolulu, 23 floors, including the first revolving restaurant in the United States, 1960
- College Grove Shopping Center, San Diego, regional outdoor shopping center with 3-story department store
- Space Needle, an element of the 1962 Century 21 Exposition, with Victor Steinbrueck (disputed), 1962
- Moorestown Mall, Moorestown, New Jersey, 1963
- The Ilikai Hotel, Waikiki, Honolulu, 1964
- Yorkdale Shopping Centre, Toronto, 1964
- 44 Montgomery, Financial District, San Francisco, 43 floors, 1967
- Holiday Park Plaza, 16 floors, 1967
- Montgomery Mall, Bethesda, Maryland, 1968
- Westin Seattle, south tower 1969 (built as the Washington Plaza Hotel), north tower 1982
- Ala Moana Hotel, the tallest building in Hawaii from 1970 through 1990, 38 floors, 1970
- Chase Tower, Rochester, New York, 27 floors, 1973
- 901 Fifth Avenue, originally Bank of California Building, 42 floors, 1973
- Henry M. Jackson Federal Building, (joint venture with Bassetti/Norton/Metler/Rekevics), 37 floors, 1974
- One Capital Center, 14 floors, 1975
- State Office Building, 11 floors, 1975
- ABC Building, 33 floors, 1976
- Qwest Plaza, 33 floors, 1976
- Southern Union Tower, 20 floors, 1980
- US Federal Building & Courthouse, 1981
- Lloyd Center Tower, Portland, Oregon, 20 floors, 1981
- Clackamas Town Center, suburban Portland, Oregon, 1981
- Sheraton Seattle Hotel, 34 floors, 1982
