= Robby Maria & The Silent Revolution (album) =

Studio album by Robby Maria & The Silent Revolution
- Released: 20 April 2012
- Recorded: November 2011 – January 2012
- Genre: Rock; pop; indie
- Length: 51:07
- Label: Timezone
- Producer: Robby Maria & Karl-Heinz Mittenzwei

Robby Maria & The Silent Revolution is the only studio album by former Berlin-based band Robby Maria & The Silent Revolution around singer-songwriter Robby Maria. It was released on 20 April 2012.

== Origin ==
The songs from the album were written by Robby Maria and drummer Anni Müller and recorded with Ben Hunt on electric guitar and Simon Birkholz on bass during the winter 2010/2011 in various studios throughout Berlin and Nicosia. The tracks, "9o1 Independence", "Cars & Highways", "Could've Been", and "Down by the Water", which Maria originally wrote with songwriter Stephan Metzner for the poetry album 9o1 Independence on the island of Cyprus were included as bonus tracks.

== Track listing ==
All music composed by Robby Maria, except tracks 11–14 by Stephan Metzner. All lyrics by Robby Maria.

1. The Spanish House – 1:50
2. Immigrants – 2:22
3. 22nd Century Girl – 4:00
4. Build Me a Woman – 3:44
5. Nostradamus' Years – 3:12
6. Break the Silence – 3:30
7. Ship to Shore (Organ Version) – 2:43
8. Like A Zombie – 3:57
9. Surprise – 3:17
10. Satellite City – 6:20
11. 9o1 Independence – 2:54
12. Cars & Highways – 5:18
13. Could've Been – 4:43
14. Down by the Water – 3:14

== Personnel ==
- Anni Müller – drums, percussions
- Ben Hunt – electric guitars, background vocals
- Simon Birkholz – bass guitar, organ
