= Metropolis (surname) =

Metropolis is a surname. Notable people with the surname include:

- Daniel Metropolis (born 1972), Australian rules footballer
- Nicholas Metropolis (1915–1999), Greek American physicist
- Peter Metropolis (born 1944), Australian rules footballer and administrator
