= Metropolis (northern Phrygia) =

Ancient town in northern Phrygia

Coordinates: 39°10′17″N 30°37′41″E

Metropolis (Ancient Greek: Μητρόπολις) was an ancient town in the north of Phrygia, and, as the name seems to indicate, a capital of the ancient kings of Phrygia, though Stephanus of Byzantium derives the name from the mother of the gods. It was situated to the north of Synnada (Athen. 13.574.), and must not be confounded with another town of the same name in the south of Phrygia. Its site is, in all probability, indicated by the ruins of Pismesh Kalasi, north of Doganlu, which show a very antique style of architecture, and mainly consist of tombs cut into the rocks; one of these tombs is that of king Midas. Although William Martin Leake is inclined to think that these ruins mark the site of Nicoleia; William Smith credit other travelers who identify them with Metropolis. From the extent of the ruins, it would seem that in the time of the Roman emperors Metropolis was an important town; but afterwards it declined, though it is still mentioned by Hierocles.

Modern scholars locate its site near Oynaş Köyü, Seyitgazi, Eskişehir Province, Asian Turkey.
