= Metropolis (Sarmatia) =

Unlocated ancient settlement in European Sarmatia recorded by Ptolemy

- Metropolis depicted on the Borysthenes river, north of Olbia, by Abraham Ortelius (1579 map, 1624 edition).
- Type: Unlocated settlement / descriptive toponym
- Periods: Classical antiquity
- Cultures: Unknown
- Location: Unlocated, European Sarmatia (hypothesized near modern Mykolaiv, Ukraine)
- Region: Northern Black Sea coast

History
- Built: Unknown
- Abandoned: Unknown

Metropolis (Ancient Greek: Μητρόπολις) is an unlocated ancient settlement in European Sarmatia, recorded by Claudius Ptolemy in the 2nd century AD in his work Geography (Book III, Chapter 5). According to Ptolemy's text, the settlement lay on the Borysthenes river, north of the Greek colony of Olbia. No archaeological site has been conclusively identified with the Ptolemaic Metropolis.

== Ptolemy's account ==
Metropolis is listed among the inland towns of European Sarmatia within the Borysthenes river basin. In Ptolemy's coordinate system, the settlement is assigned a position of 56°30′ E and 49°30′ N. The coordinate data provided in the Geography for the northern Black Sea region contains systematic mathematical distortions, which complicates modern attempts to map these figures onto the physical landscape.

== Etymology ==
No indigenous Scythian or Sarmatian name for the settlement is recorded in historical sources. The entry in Ptolemy's work uses the descriptive Ancient Greek term Metropolis ("mother city" or capital). Similar descriptive terms appear elsewhere in Ptolemy's Geography when listing settlements in non-Greek regions, reflecting the practice of recording Greek administrative or structural descriptions in place of lost local toponyms.

== Cartographic history ==
During the Renaissance, cartographers reconstructing maps from Ptolemy's data consistently placed Metropolis on the Borysthenes, following his textual description rather than a strict recalculation of his coordinates. Notable examples include:

- the Octava Europae Tabula from the 1482 Ulm edition;
- Gerardus Mercator's 1578 edition of the Geography (Tabulae Geographicae Cl. Ptolemaei), which frequently depicts the settlement at a strategic river confluence.

These renderings reflect Renaissance cartographers' tendency to prioritize textual fidelity over raw coordinate math, a distinction that later became important to scholarly debates about the site's theoretical location.

== Identification challenges ==
1578 Mercator edition of Ptolemy's Geography, depicting Metropolis (Metro pol) at a river confluence.

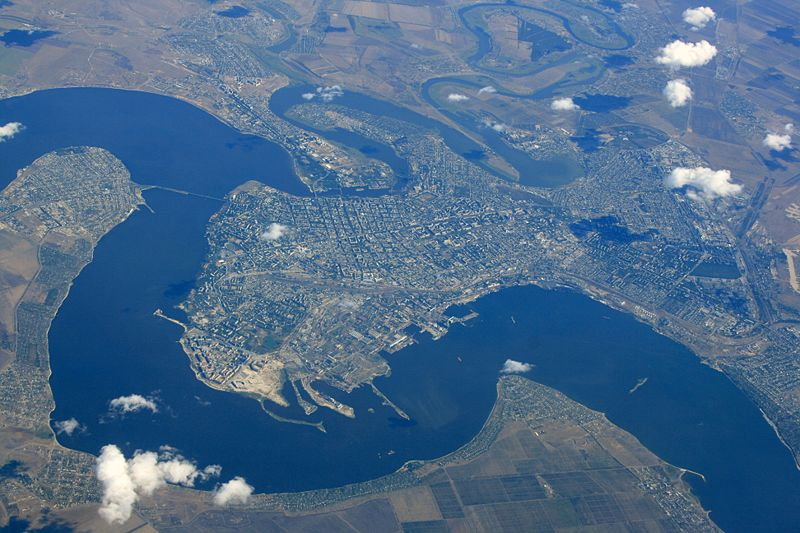
Topography at the confluence of the Southern Bug (Hypanis) and Inhul rivers in modern Mykolaiv.

Comparative visual illustrating the layout of Metropolis on Renaissance Ptolemaic maps alongside the modern river confluence at Mykolaiv, reflecting the hypothetical coordinate shift to the Hypanis basin.

Modern attempts to identify Metropolis are complicated by well-documented systemic distortions in Ptolemy's coordinates for the northern Black Sea region. While the text explicitly places the settlement on the Borysthenes, a strict mathematical calculation relative to Ptolemy's stated position for Olbia (57°00′ E, 49°00′ N) shifts Metropolis roughly 30 arcminutes west and 30 arcminutes north of the river. This mathematical offset would place its theoretical position in the basin of the Hypanis (Southern Bug) instead, creating a direct contradiction between Ptolemy's text and his own coordinates.

Additionally, comparative cartographic analysis highlights a correlation between Renaissance depictions of Metropolis and the topography of the modern Mykolaiv region. On maps such as the 1482 Ulm edition of Ptolemy's Geography, Metropolis is strategically placed at a prominent Y-shaped river confluence north of Olbia. When combining this visual cartographic tradition with the mathematical coordinate shift to the Hypanis basin, the geographical layout closely mirrors the confluence of the Southern Bug and Inhul rivers, where the city of Mykolaiv is currently situated.

Given the generic nature of the name, these profound coordinate inconsistencies, and the lack of published archaeological consensus, associating the Ptolemaic Metropolis with this exact modern location remains a theoretical geographical reconstruction and entirely speculative absent epigraphic confirmation.

== See also ==
- Geography (Ptolemy)
- European Sarmatia
- Olbia
