= Metropolis (Troad) =

Town on the Propontis in ancient Troad

Metropolis (Ancient Greek: Μητρόπολις) was a town on the Propontis in the ancient Troad. It is known only from epigraphic testimony documenting a tribute decree of Athens of the year 422/1 BCE, where Metropolis, within the district of the Hellespont, had to pay a phoros of a talent. From this evidence it can be deduced that Metropolis was part of Delian League.

Its exact location is unknown but the epigraphic evidence indicates that it should be close to the city of Priapus.
