= Artango =

Artango were a French art tango duo of the 1990s who recorded for EMI's Virgin Classics label. The duo comprised pianist Fabrice Ravel Chapuis and Jacques Trupin on bandonéon.

== Albums ==
- Métropole - with string quartet.
- Un Soir - with Orchestre nationale de Lille, conducted Jean-Claude Casadesus
