= Metropolis (southern Phrygia) =

Ancient town in southern Phrygia

Coordinates: 38°14′31″N 30°29′41″E

Metropolis (Ancient Greek: Μητρόπολις) was an ancient town in the southern part of Phrygia, belonging to the conventus of Apamea. That this town is different from the more northerly town of the same name in northern Phrygia, is quite evident, even without knowing that Stephanus of Byzantium mentions two towns named Metropolis in Phrygia, and that Hierocles. and the Notitiae speak of a town of this name in two different provinces of Phrygia. In Roman times, it was assigned to the province of Pisidia, where it became a bishopric. No longer a residential see, it remains, under the name Metropolis in Pisidia, a titular see of the Roman Catholic Church.

Modern scholars locate its site near Tatarlı, Afyonkarahisar Province, Asian Turkey.
