= Metropol Theater =

Metropol Theater or Metropol may refer to several theaters or cinemas:

- Metropol (Berlin)
- Metropol-Theater (Berlin-Mitte), formerly part of Komische Oper Berlin (1898–1945) and Admiralspalast (1955–1998)
- Metropol-Theater (Munich)

== See also ==
- Metropolis Theatre (disambiguation)
