= Metropolis (barbershop quartet) =

Metropolis relaxing after a show

Metropolis was a barbershop quartet affiliated with the Barbershop Harmony Society. The group won five consecutive medals with the Barbershop Harmony Society at their annual International Convention. Metropolis has performed over 500 stage shows in the United States and in Finland, Russia, England, New Zealand, The Netherlands, Japan and Ireland from 1994 to 2013. They performed in over 190 cities around the world and over 40 states/provinces in the USA & Canada.

Metropolis appeared on "What's Your Hobby", as well as the pilot episode of the "Fourth Floor Show" on E! Entertainment Television with Vance DeGeneres, followed by the filming of a national Dr Pepper commercial. They have appeared on Diagnosis: Murder in which Dick Van Dyke sang a song with the quartet in the episode entitled "Santa Claude". Metropolis has made radio appearances and performed in an independent film entitled "Pacino is Missing".

They have been section leaders for the International Barbershop Chorus Champion Masters of Harmony and were part of the performances in Salt Lake City in 1996 and Anaheim in 1999 which gained the Masters their third and fourth consecutive International Chorus Championships. The quartet was also named the Masters of Harmony 1996 Quartet of the Year.

In addition to becoming 1996–97 Far Western District Champions, on May 9, 1998, Metropolis earned the Harmony Sweepstakes' Grand National A Cappella Championship – the first barbershop quartet to do so in the history of the event – and in 1999, the Contemporary A Cappella Recording Awards (or CARAs) nominated Metropolis' CD "Aural Hygiene" for "Best Barbershop Recording" and "Best Barbershop Song".

In 2002 in Portland, Oregon, Metropolis earned a bronze medal in the Barbershop Harmony Society's International Competition and repeated this achievement in Montreal, Quebec in 2003, Louisville, Kentucky in 2004, Salt Lake City in 2005 and again in Indianapolis, Indiana in 2006.

The quartet performed an average of 23 shows per year for over 12 years, traveling around the United States as well as traveling to Europe, Asia, Russia and the Pacific Rim to teach and perform. Their final performance was on October 19, 2013, on the Harborlites Chorus annual show.

== Members ==
The original members of the quartet, who earned their first 3 medals together at the International Barbershop Convention are:

- James Sabina – tenor (medalist) 1996–2015
- Bob Hartley – lead (medalist) 1994–present
- Mike McGee – baritone (medalist) 1994–2004
- Brian Philbin – bass (medalist) 1994–present

In September 2004, Mike McGee, who had moved to Florida, requested replacement of his part in the quartet. The remaining members of Metropolis conducted auditions for a replacement baritone, eventually choosing Kelly Shepard, former Bass of 2002 Far Western District Championship quartet "Sam's Club". Mike continued to fill in with the group over the years as they continued to perform around the world. At that time, the lineup became:

- James Sabina – tenor (medalist) 1996–2015
- Bob Hartley – lead (medalist) 1994–2015
- Kelly Shepard – baritone (medalist) 2004–2015
- Brian Philbin – bass (medalist) 1994–2015

This version of the group went on to earn two more bronze medals at the International Barbershop Convention.

In June 2015, tenor James Sabina died unexpectedly at age 39, thus ending the quartet's ability to perform. Members of the Metropolis family set up an educational fund, on their memorial page for James, for his two daughters.

Other previous members include:

- Ken Potter – tenor 1994–95

== Awards ==
- 2002–06 International Bronze Medalist Quartet (Barbershop Harmony Society)
- 1996–97 Far Western District Champions (Barbershop Harmony Society)
- 1998 Grand National A Cappella Champions (Harmony Sweepstakes / CASA)
- 1996 "The Masters of Harmony" Quartet of the Year
- 1998 CARA (Contemporary A Cappella Recording Awards) nominee ("Aural Hygiene" for "Best Barbershop Recording" and "Best Barbershop Song")

== Television appearances ==
- "What's Your Hobby" – DIY Network, originally aired on HGTV (Home and Garden Television)
- "Fourth Floor Show" – E! Entertainment Television – pilot episode, hosted by Vance DeGeneris
- National "Dr Pepper" Commercial (Singing "Dr Pepper, You're a Part of Me")
- "Diagnosis Murder" – "Santa Claude" (Singing "Stay Awake", as well as "Winter Wonderland", with Dick Van Dyke on bass)

== Film ==
- Pacino is Missing – Feature film – Metropolis as "The Slim Guys"

== Radio ==
- Meineke Muffler – "Meineke, Meineke, Meineke Quartet" Promo
- WDVR – FM – Applause Show Promo – Princeton, NJ
- KQFB – FM – Call Letters Jingle – Santa Barbara, CA
- KQFB – FM – Kurt and Jane Morning Show Jingle – Santa Barbara, CA

== Work with Masters of Harmony ==
- Brian Philbin – Bass Section Leader 1996–99
- Mike McGee – Baritone Section Leader 1996–98, Associate Director 1996–1999
- Bob Hartley – Lead Section Leader 1996–99
- James Sabina -Tenor Section Leader 1996–98
- Kelly Shepard – Lead Section Leader 2000, Bass Section Leader 2001–02
- Ken Potter – Lead Section Leader 2001–09, Assistant Director 2004–09
