= Metropolis Project =

The Metropolis Project is an international network of researchers, policy-makers, international organizations and civil society organizations for the development of comparative research and policy-relevant knowledge on migration, diversity, and immigrant integration in cities in Canada and around the world.

The Metropolis Project's principal decision-making body is an International Steering Committee of representatives from over 40 countries. The Project is managed by a Secretariat with offices in Ottawa, Amsterdam and in Asia with functions distributed across organizations in Seoul, Manila and Beijing. The Ottawa Secretariat is responsible for establishing the Project's strategic directions. Howard Duncan is the Project's Executive Head.

== Metropolis Professional Development ==
The Metropolis Project launched in April 2014 a new training program for senior policy-makers, senior managers of settlement agencies, officials of international organizations and the private sector. The programme is intended to provide participants with information, analysis and tools on the management of migration and integration. A pilot training will be offered in June 2014. Metropolis Professional Development has been developed in collaboration with worldwide renowned experts such as Graeme Hugo (University of Adelaide), Jan Niessen (Migration Policy Group), Imelda Nicolas (Commission on Filipinos Overseas) and Peter Schatzer (IOM) among many others. The Metropolis Project is managed by a Secretariat, located in Ottawa and Amsterdam. It is also guided by an International Steering Committee composed of representatives from over 40 countries. Howard Duncan is the Project's Executive Head. The project has recently been renewed for Phase III and the secretariat has been hard at work in implementing many of the initiatives as laid out in the new Memorandum of Understanding (https://web.archive.org/web/20110929132401/http://canada.metropolis.net/pdfs/Annexes%20A-L%20Eng.pdf).

== Publications ==
The Metropolis Project partners with Springer in the publication of an academic journal, the Journal of International Migration and Integration (Revue de l'intégration et de la migration internationale). It is published quarterly, in both English and French; its first issue was in Winter, 2000. The managing editor for the 2013-2014 issue is Lori Wilkinson of the University of Manitoba.

== Annual Conference ==
The project has hosted an international conference concerning research and policy on human migration annually since 1996. The 2015 meeting will be held in Mexico City, Mexico in September 2015 (Metropolis 2015 site) with the slogan "Migrants: Key Players in the 21st Century".

Previous conference locations have been:

- 2014 - Milan, Italy
- 2013 - Tampere, Finland
- 2012 - Auckland, New Zealand
- 2011 - Ponte Delgada, Azores, Portugal
- 2009 – Copenhagen, Denmark
- 2008 – Bonn, Germany
- 2007 – Melbourne, Australia
- 2006 – Lisbon, Portugal
- 2005 – Toronto, Ontario, Canada
- 2004 – Geneva, Switzerland
- 2003 – Vienna, Austria
- 2002 – Oslo, Norway
- 2001 – Rotterdam, Netherlands
- 2000 – Vancouver, British Columbia, Canada
- 1999 – Washington D.C., United States
- 1998 – Zikhron Ya'akov, Israel
- 1997 – Copenhagen, Denmark
- 1996 – Milan, Italy
