= Metropolitan Magazine =

Metropolitan Magazine can refer to:

- Metropolitan Magazine (New York City), later known as Macfadden's Fiction Lover's Magazine, was a monthly periodical in the early 20th century with articles on politics and literature
- The Metropolitan Magazine, a London monthly published 1831–1850

== See also ==
- Metro Magazine, an American rail transport trade magazine
- Metro (magazine), a New Zealand lifestyle magazine
