= Metropolis (Euboea) =

Metropolis (Ancient Greek: Μητρόπολις) was a town in ancient Euboea, Greece, mentioned by Stephanus of Byzantium. Its location is not otherwise known.
