= Hotel Metropole (Santa Cruz, California) =

- Metropole Hotel
- U.S. National Register of Historic Places
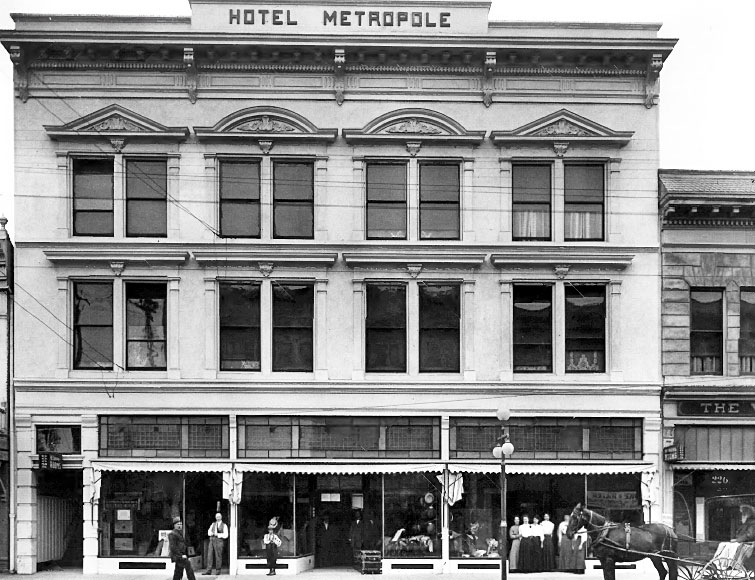

- Location within California
- Location: 1111 Pacific Avenue, Santa Cruz, California
- Coordinates: 36°58′19″N 122°01′29″W
- Built: 1908
- Architect: Charles Kay
- Architectural style: Italianate
- NRHP reference No.: 79000553
- Added to NRHP: 1979

The Hotel Metropole, built in 1908, was added to the National Register of Historical Places in 1979. It was demolished after being severely damaged in the 1989 Loma Prieta earthquake.

It was built as a hotel to offer "forty-eight 'furnished rooms for transient and permanent guests' at fifty cents per day", and also offered space for "a millinery, the offices of C. W. Waldron, a partner of McPherson's, and the C.O.D. Grocery." It was later renamed as the Hotel Al Rose in 1935 and as the Hotel Drake in 1946, and was operated as a hotel until 1961. In 1976, the building housed Plaza Books / Paper Vision.

It was deemed notable in 1978 as "a unique Santa Cruz example of turn-of-the-century commercial architecture in the late Italianate style in which pressed-metal ornamentation replaced the more costly and fancy Victorian plaster work it often copied. The four pediments atop the third-story windows, and the acanthus design cornices are particularly handsome. The building is an important part of the physical fabric of the Pacific Garden Mall and contributes to the historical continuity and sense of urbanity along the street. In addition to its inherent architectural value, the building also contributes significant scale to this portion of the street, which is much broader than the tight portion of Pacific Avenue at its northern end."
