= Metropolis (Robby Maria album) =

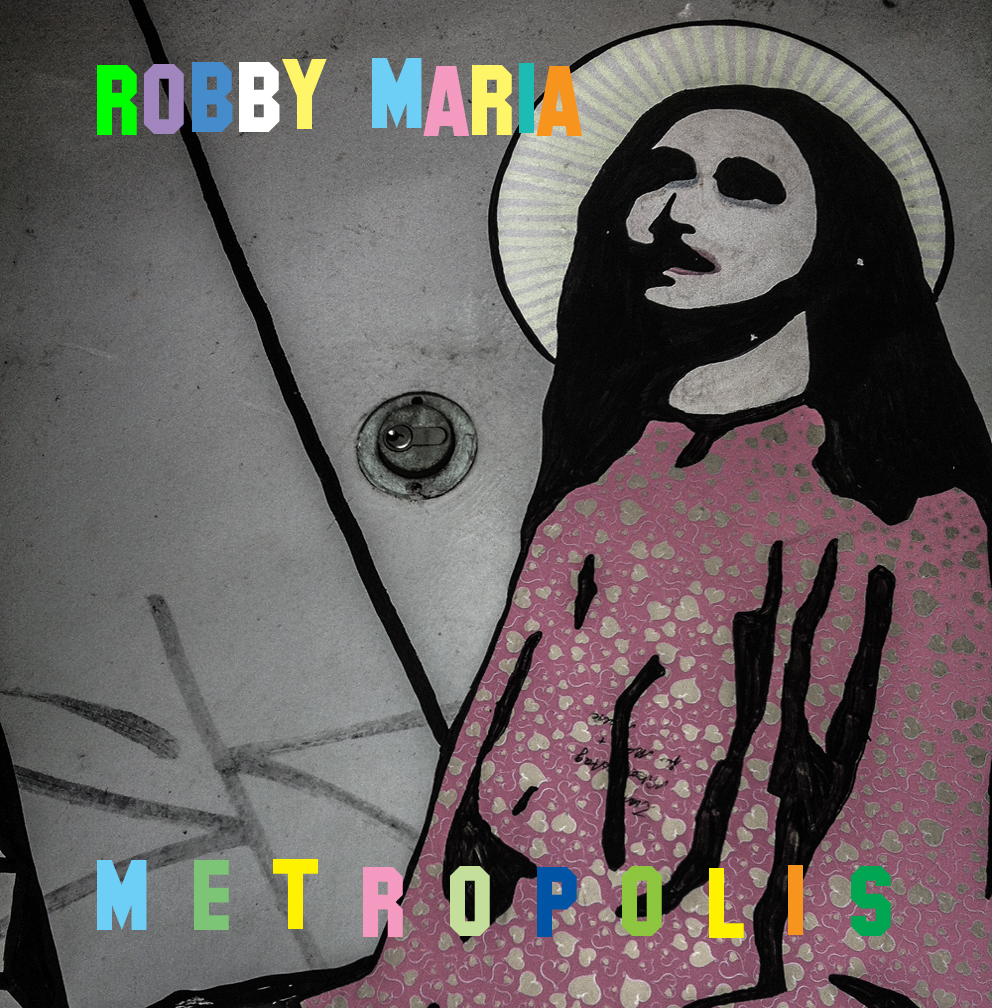

Studio album by Robby Maria
- Released: 8 March 2013
- Recorded: August 2012
- Studio: Limelight Studios, Berlin
- Genre: singer-songwriter, indie
- Length: 43:51
- Label: Timezone
- Producer: Robby Maria

Metropolis is the debut studio album by Robby Maria and was released on March 8, 2013.

== Track listing ==
All songs written by Robby Maria.

1. "Days in the City" – 3:24
2. "In the Light of the Summer" – 1:44
3. "Run & Hide" – 2:59
4. "Secret Alphabets" – 2:09
5. "Butterfly" – 2:13
6. "Metropolis" – 6:14
7. "You're a Memory" – 3:03
8. "Move Along" – 2:44
9. "Troublemaker" – 1:44
10. "European Queen" – 3:39
11. "Troubadour" – 3:24
12. "Love Song" – 2:27
13. 'Woman in You" – 4:17
14. "Har-ma.ged'on" – 3:53

== Personnel ==
- Anni Müller – drums, percussions

== Critical reception ==
Ferdinand Martinelli from the online-Musikmagazine Newcomerszene wrote: "...with minimal instrumentation Robby shows us a unique world full of beautiful melodies and catchy rhythms played by Berlin drummer Anni Müller. The album contains European folkrock music at its best."Albumcheck.de voted with 8 out of 10 points and Martin Döring from Musikrezensionen wrote: "... the tracks are very thoughtful and great to listen to which is highly owed to Robby's excellent and interesting voice."
