= Metro Theatre (Vancouver) =

Non-profit community theatre

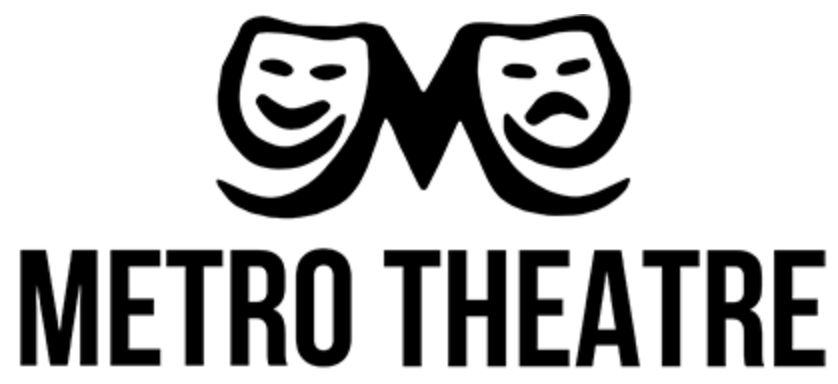
- Address: 1370 Marine Drive SW; Vancouver, BC
- Capacity: 300

Construction
- Opened: 1962

Website
- https://metrotheatre.com/

Metro Theatre is a non-profit community theatre based in the Marpole neighbourhood of Vancouver, BC.

== History ==
Housed in the historic Marpole Movie Theatre, the Metro Theatre began as an idea for a new home for local theatre in Vancouver. The Metropolitan Theatre Society was created in 1962 with founding members including Don Poole, Ruth Cunnigham, Lawrence Drummond, Eve Mutter, Eleanor Heath, Jack Richards.

The society moved forward raising funds, and in 1962 purchased the Marpole Theatre which was built in 1932 and operated until 1955. Its inaugural season was a collaboration between eleven of Vancouver's local theatre companies and launched in 1964.

In 1977, provincial funding changes redirected cultural funding to "professional theatre" companies putting the company's future in question, but ultimately was save by community efforts and private donations.

== Present day ==
The Metro Theatre regularly produces up to eight shows a year including a traditional British Pantomime each holiday season.

Over its 62 years, the company has produced more 500 plays with over 1 million hours of volunteer contributions.

== Venue ==
The Metro Theatre hosts a 28'x22' stage with a fully functioning fly system for curtains and scenic drops, sound and lighting systems. The auditorium includes a small balcony and contains 300 seats.

The upstairs area of the theatre is home to a licensed bar and 65-seat lounge with additional green room space.
