= Metropolis (Doris) =

Town in ancient Doris, Greece

Metropolis (Ancient Greek: Μητρόπολις) was a town in ancient Doris, Greece, mentioned by Stephanus of Byzantium. Its location is not otherwise known.
