= Metropolitan Bank =

Metropolitan Bank may refer to:

- Habib Metropolitan Bank, Pakistan
- Metropolitan Bank and Trust Company, Philippines
- Metropolitan Bank (Chicago), a bank in Chicago
- Metropolitan Bank of Zimbabwe, a commercial bank in Zimbabwe
- Metropolitan Bank (of England and Wales), a bank in England and Wales from 1893 to 1914
