= The Metropolitan (newspaper) =

Student newspaper of Metropolitan State University of Denver

- Type: Student newspaper
- Format: Tabloid
- School: Metropolitan State University of Denver
- Founded: 1979
- Circulation: 700
- Website: mymetmedia.com

The Metropolitan, or The Met as it is commonly called, is the school newspaper of Metropolitan State University of Denver. It has a weekly press run of 700 copies, which are distributed every Wednesday to more than 60 locations across the Auraria Campus and select locations in downtown Denver. The paper is a tabloid style publication with sections for news, sports, opinions, features and music. It focuses on issues of interest and concern to students at Metro and the other colleges located on the Auraria Campus.

The editorial direction and content of The Metropolitan are entirely student-run. The staff of The Metropolitan comprises MSU Denver students, most of whom work on a strictly volunteer basis. An editorial staff of about 10 students, including section editors, copy editors, photo editors and an editor-in-chief direct a larger staff of about 10-15 reporters, photographers, columnists and artists. The Metropolitan is supported through advertising revenue, although it does receive funding through student fees.

The Metropolitan is produced in the Office of Student Media, which also produces a literary and arts magazine, a news broadcast, a radio station and websites. The publications and broadcasts produced in the Office of Student media have won hundreds of awards from organizations such as the Society of Professional Journalists, Rocky Mountain Collegiate Press Association, and the Associated Collegiate Press. The Office of Student Media is run by a director and assistant director.

== History ==
In 1979, staff from previous student publications, The Paper, Cherry Creek Pioneer and The Auraria Times joined together and started The Metropolitan. Emerson Schwartzkopf, and Steve Werges are credited for launching The Metropolitan, they were assisted by Frank X Mullen, Sal Ruibal, and S. Peter Duray-Bito, Metropolitan State University of Denver’s current student newspaper.

The original newspaper offices were located in the Plaza Building. After the renovations on the Tivoli Student Union were completed in 1994, The Metropolitan moved to its current office at the Tivoli for a larger working and production space.

A major point in history for The Metropolitan occurred in 1992 when Editor Shawn Christopher Cox requested the names of the candidates running for the Dean of Letters, Arts and Sciences position. A six-week battle ensued between The Metropolitan staff who wanted to release those names to the public and members of the search committee, including Jodi Wetzel, who would not give up the information. Finally, in December 1992, Cox obtained the names of the three candidates and printed them in the Dec. 4 issue of The Metropolitan. This remains an important time in The Metropolitan’s history since the requested information was and still is public record, but there continues to be debate over whether names of Metro candidates should be released on the basis for the candidate’s privacy.

== Awards ==
In 2006, The Metropolitan won the award for Best All-Around Non-Daily Student Newspaper from the Society of Professional Journalists. The staff that year also received two winning photography awards from SPJ.

In 2012, student photographer Rachel Fuenzalida won first place in the General News Photography category of the national Mark of Excellence awards.

== Office of Student Media ==
The Met Report — Student television station and Internet Broadcasting

The Met Report is an Emmy award-winning newscast at Metropolitan State College of Denver. In 2000, the Met Report was founded by Metro students Tom Livingston, Krystal Tweeddale, and Alex Brancard. The Met Report’s mission is to cover breaking news throughout the Auraria Campus that interest Metro State students. Every Friday at 12:30 p.m. the Met Report’s newscast produces a 30-minute news segment, which can be viewed on the Internet, on campus channel 20, or on Comcast cable channel 54 in Denver County.

KMet Radio — Student Radio Broadcasting

Met Radio is a student-directed, Internet radio station at Metropolitan State College of Denver. Jazz, rap, hip-hop, alternative, rock music and news could be listened to daily on www.kmetradio.org. Met Radio was created about 3 or 4 years ago by a group of Metro students who desired to spread interest in music and radio throughout the Auraria Campus. Met Radio started as a club and has disbanded. However, Met Radio is still transforming itself with the assistance the Office of Student Media. In the spring of 2006, Met Radio and the Met Report teamed up to broadcast Metro State basketball games live on the Internet.

Met Online — Online Student Journalism

Met Online is the web version of The Metropolitan, the weekly student-run newspaper of Metropolitan State College of Denver. The Met Online offers in-depth and breaking news stories, photo essays and exclusive online content.

Metrosphere — Student Literary and Art Magazine

The "Metrosphere" is a collection visual art and literature created and edited by Metro students. Each fall the Office of Student Media selects an editor to direct a campus search for unique literary and visual art pieces. Flyers are put up, ads are placed in publications, and students are asks to submit their best works. Deadline for submissions is December. The editor and staff of the "Metrosphere" put together a magazine consisting of the best submissions. Each spring the "Metrosphere" magazine is distributed to students across campus at big events.

In 2011, the Metrosphere won a Pacemaker Award in the literary (four-year) category.
