= The Metropolitan (Rochester, New York) =

Skyscraper in Rochester, New York

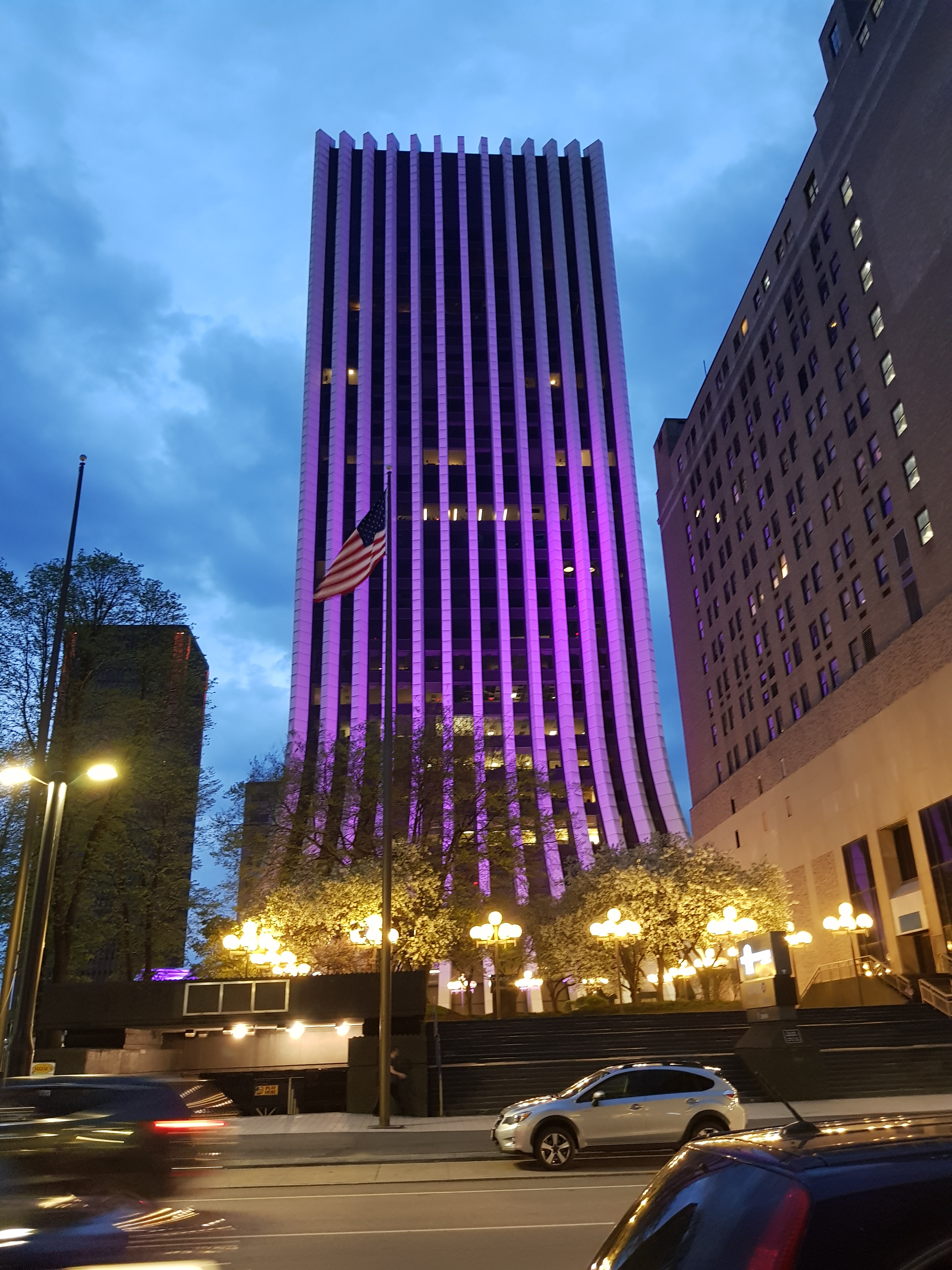
- The Metropolitan in downtown Rochester at dusk

General information
- Status: Completed
- Type: Mixed-Use
- Location: 1 S Clinton Ave, Rochester, NY 14604
- Coordinates: 43.156550°N 77.606863°W
- Completed: 1973
- Renovated: 1987 & 2015
- Owner: Gallina Development Corporation

Height
- Roof: 392 feet (119 m)

Technical details
- Floor count: 27
- Floor area: 356,000 sq ft (33,073 m^{2})
- Lifts/elevators: made by Haughton

Design and construction
- Architect: John Graham & Company

Website
- themetropolitanroc.com

The Metropolitan, formerly known as Chase Tower (before 2015), and Lincoln First Bank (before 1996), is a skyscraper located in Rochester, New York, United States. It is the third tallest skyscraper in Rochester, standing at 392 feet (119 m). It has 27 floors and was constructed in 1973. The architect responsible for designing the building was John Graham & Company. The building is unique for its outstanding white vertical fins and that it curves outward on the bottom. This building is also known for its fast elevators. Many people refer to them as "rockets". They were installed in the 1970s and travel at about 1000 feet per minute.

The Metropolitan was renovated in 1987 and again in 2015. It has 474,325 square feet (44,066.2 m^{2}) of gross area, with 424,000 square feet (39,400 m^{2}) of leasable office space.

== Recent renovations ==
The upper floors of the building were converted to apartments in 2016.

A new entrance way was completed in 2017.

== Damage to fins ==
The white fins were originally made with marble panel coverings. By the 1980s, however, these began to warp and loosen. They were replaced with painted aluminum panels.

== Gallery ==
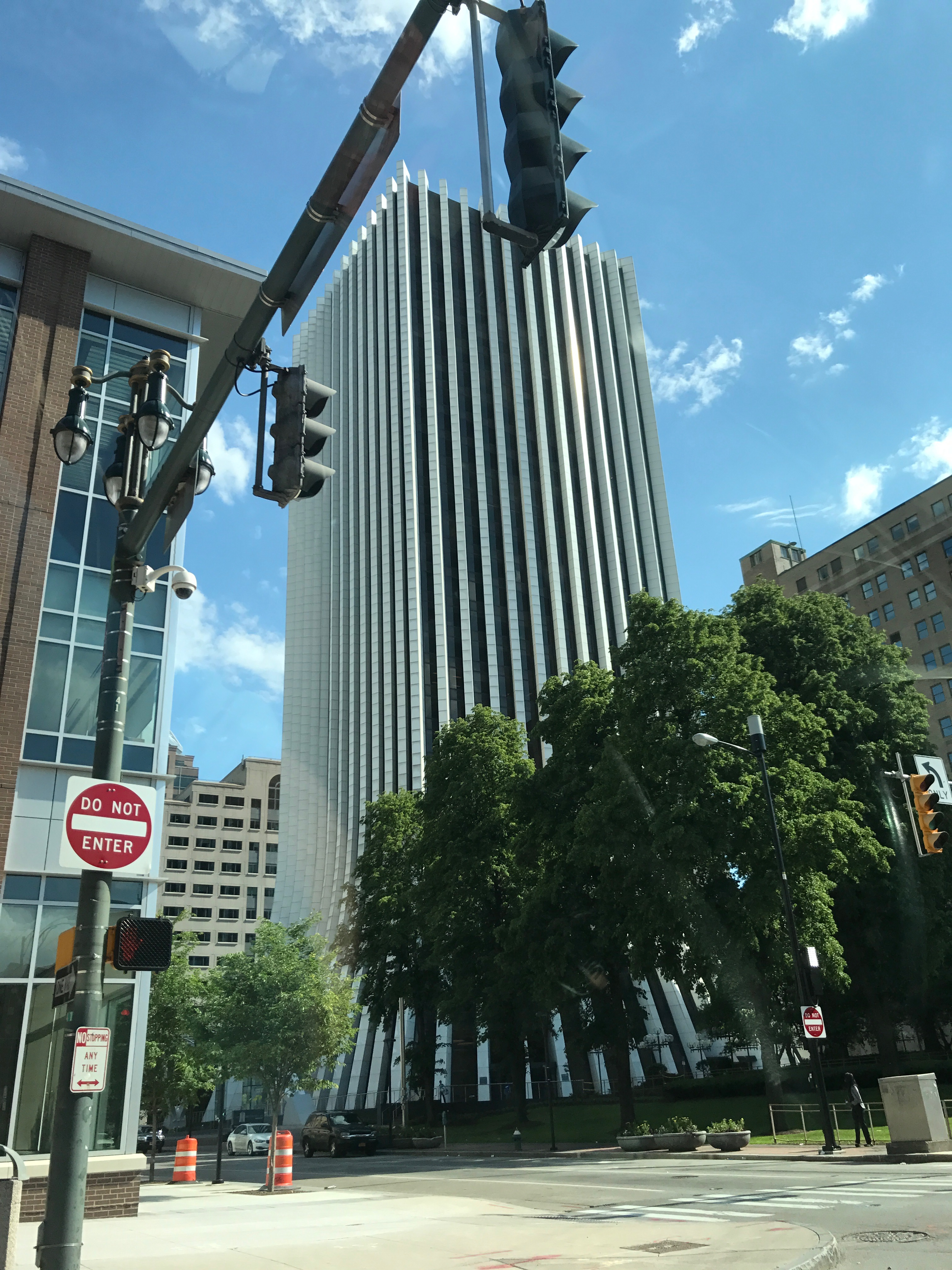
Metropolitan Tower, formerly Chase Tower. Rochester NY.

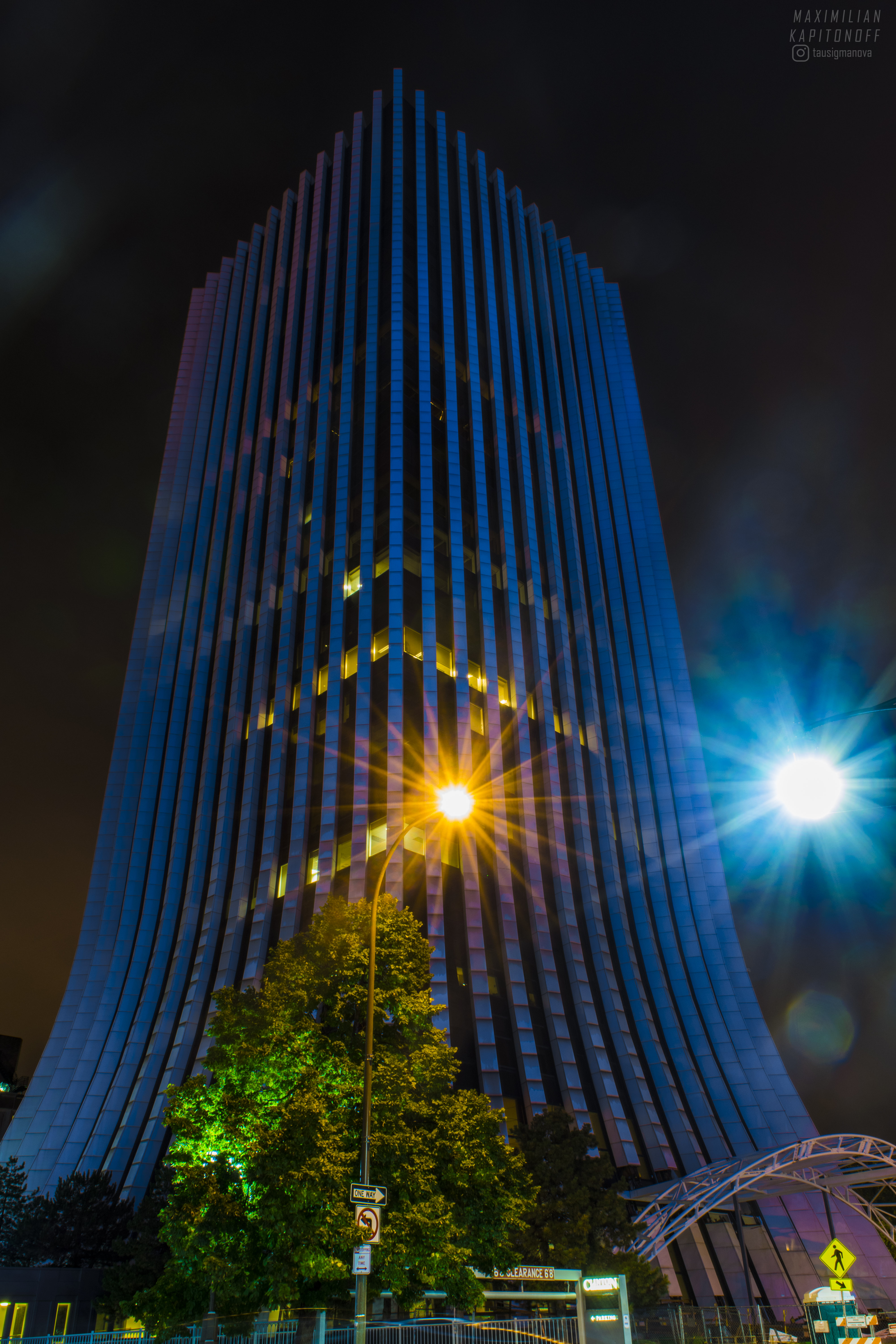
The tower at night

== See also ==
- List of tallest buildings in Rochester, New York
- List of tallest buildings in Upstate New York
