= Robby Maria & The Silent Revolution =

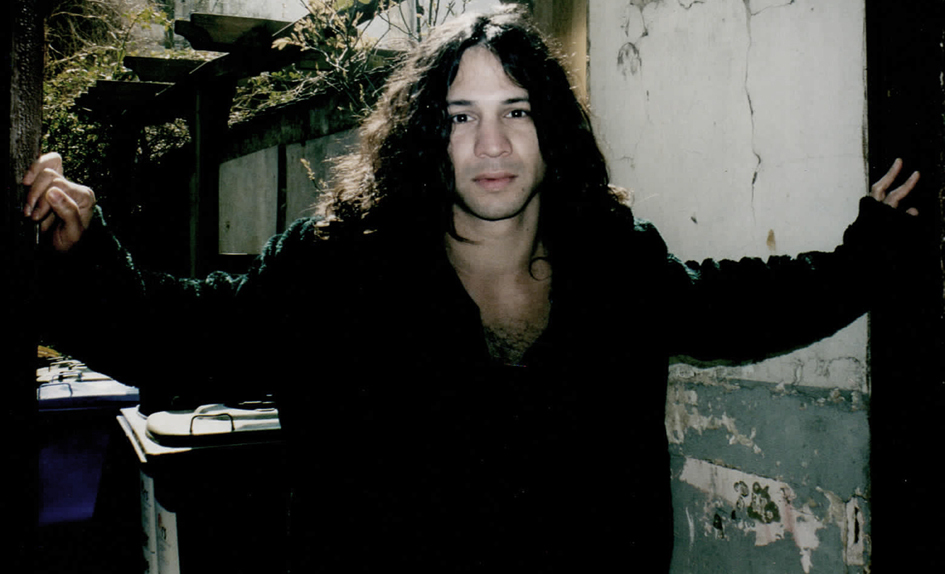
- Robby Maria - Apocalyptic Folk Music

Background information
- Origin: Berlin, Europe
- Genres: Rock, apocalyptic folk
- Years active: 2008–12
- Labels: Timezone
- Past members: Robby Maria; Anni Müller; Simon Birkholz; Ben Hunt

Robby Maria & The Silent Revolution were a Berlin based rock band formed in 2008 by singer-songwriter Robby Maria and drummer Anni Müller. The band consisted of Robby Maria on lead vocals and acoustic guitar, Anni Müller on drums and Simon Birkholz on bass. Ben Hunt on electric guitar was an on and off member of the band appearing on the band's only official album Robby Maria & The Silent Revolution.

== History ==
The band was founded by Robby Maria and drummer Anni Müller in 2008 after the split of their former group Killmotorhill. Bass player Simon Birkholz joined the band after an open audition only a couple of months later. The trio played their first show in the Berlin club Aufsturz on January 11, 2009 and achieved cult status in the Berlin alternative music scene being known for their provoking and passionate performances. They played more than 80 shows before breaking up after the release of their first album in 2012.

== Musical style ==
The band developed a unique music identity based on the fact, that they were a rock band lacking an electric guitar. Singer Robby Maria recited poems during the songs and generally stood out because his wild and unpredictable behaviour on stage. Critics detected a resemblance to early performances of The Doors which was obviously intended so by the band. As the band's musical style didn't fit any categorization, Maria created the term of "Apocalyptic Folk Music" to make their style accessible to a larger audience.

== Discography ==
- Robby Maria & The Silent Revolution (2012)

== Personnel ==
- Anni Müller – drums
- Simon Birkholz – bass guitar
