= Metropolitan Theatre =

Metropolitan Theatre (or Metropolitan Theater) may refer to:

== United States ==
- Metropolitan Opera House (Philadelphia), Pennsylvania
- Metropolitan Theatre (Morgantown, West Virginia)
- Metropolitan Theatres (Los Angeles), California
- Agora Theatre and Ballroom, Cleveland, Ohio, formerly Metropolitan Theater
- Bijou Theater (Hermosa Beach), California, formerly Metropolitan Theater
- Paramount Theatre (Los Angeles), California, formerly Metropolitan Theater or Grauman's Metropolitan Theater
- Wang Theatre, Boston, Massachusetts, formerly Metropolitan Theater

== Other countries ==
- Manila Metropolitan Theater, Philippines
- Medellín Metropolitan Theatre, Colombia
- Metropolitan Theatre, London, England, United Kingdom
- Metropolitan Theatre (Winnipeg), Manitoba, Canada

== See also ==
- Metro Theatre (disambiguation)
- Teatro Metropólitan, Mexico City
