= Honduran art =

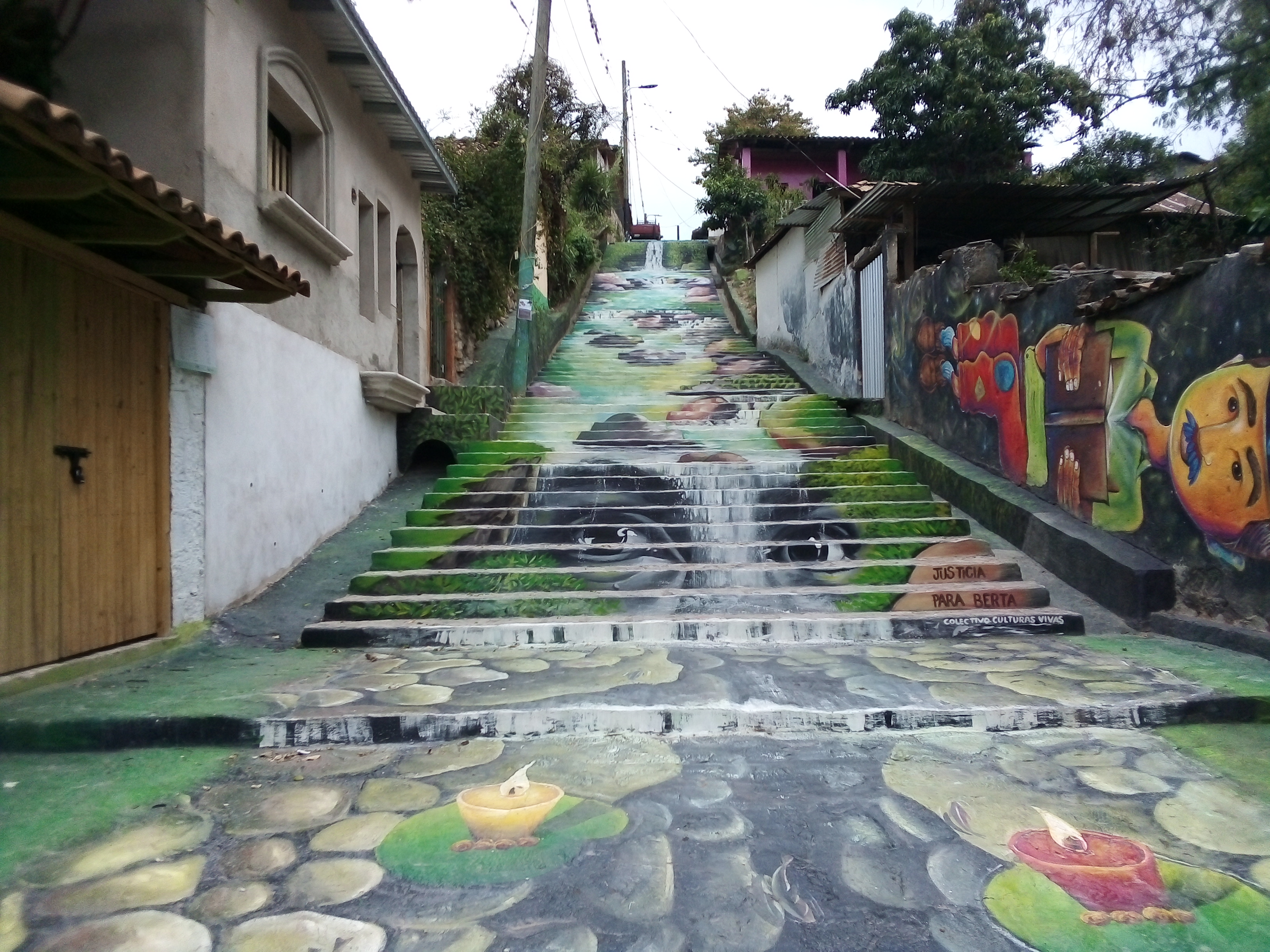
Murals in Cantarranas.

Honduran art is any artistic piece produced or that resembles the cultural patterns of the people of the Republic of Honduras, which has existed with the first presence of human beings within the modern Honduran territory.

Honduran art today consists of various artistic movements over the centuries that mixes both Euro-Western and indigenous elements with an especial influence from Afro-Caribbean groups such as the Garífuna. It consists of may techniques, such as realism, surrealism, cubism, abstraction, and more.

== Pre-Columbian art ==
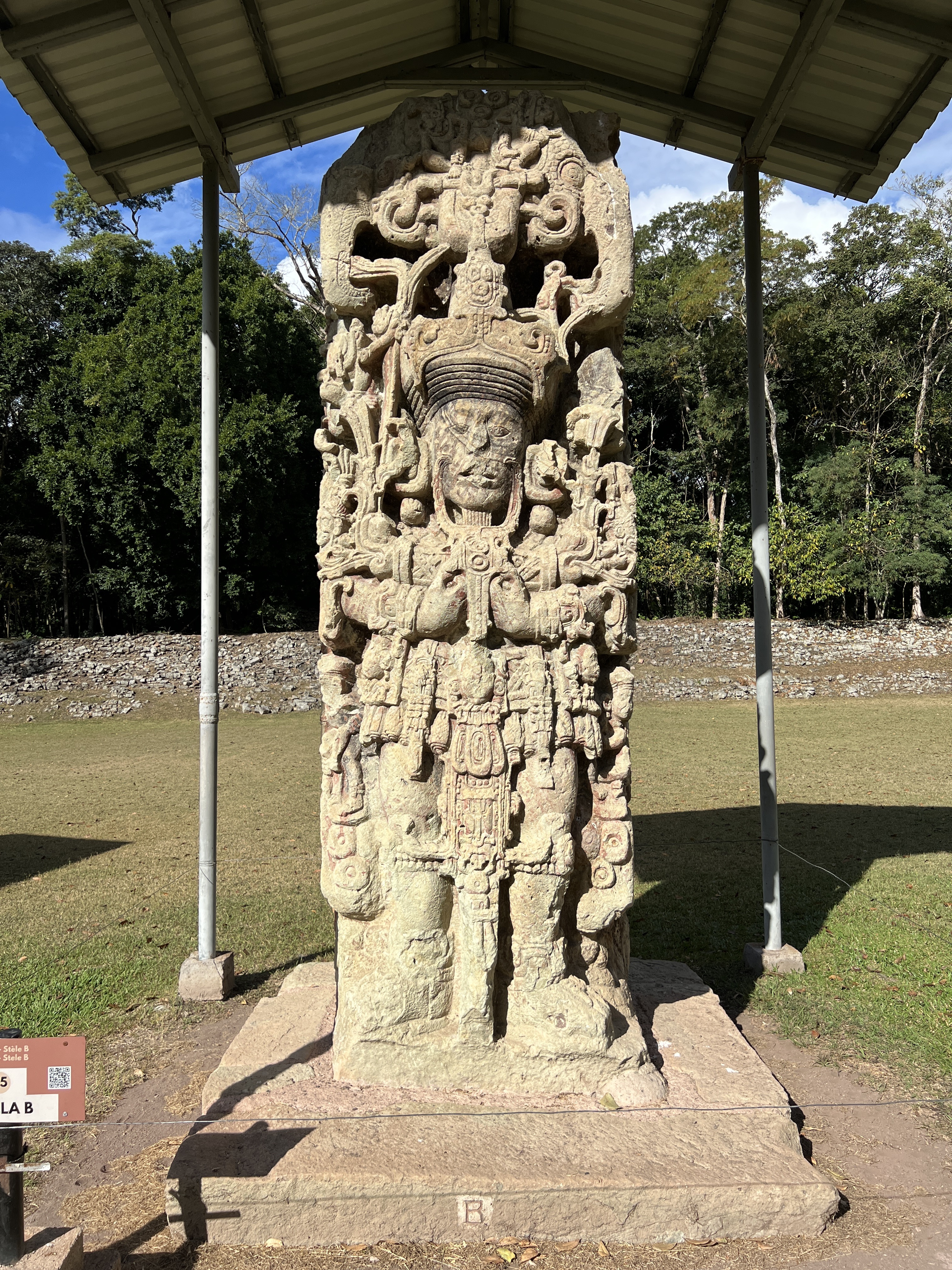
Estela B of Copán

The oldest artistic pieces in Honduras are dated to the first migrations of human groups, consisting of hunters and gatherers who arrived at the isthmus at the end of the last ice age. Some examples of these pieces on modern Honduran soil are located in the region of La Esperanza in the department of Intibucá, La Cueva del Gigante in La Paz, and the Footprints of Juan.

Over the centuries, sedentary cultures settled and formed the first population centers of Honduras. These centers were dedicated to agriculture and eventually also became cultural centers, giving shape to more complex artistic expressions. Formation of the first forms of pottery, carving, and painting occurred here. Many of the techniques had both religious and ornamental purposes.

Cultural influences eventually arrived from other places. Notably, Olmec influence has been observed in art located on vessels dating from the Honduran pre-classical period. This influence would also be crucial for the religious development of the Pre-Columbian Honduran people, something that would also be reflected in their art.

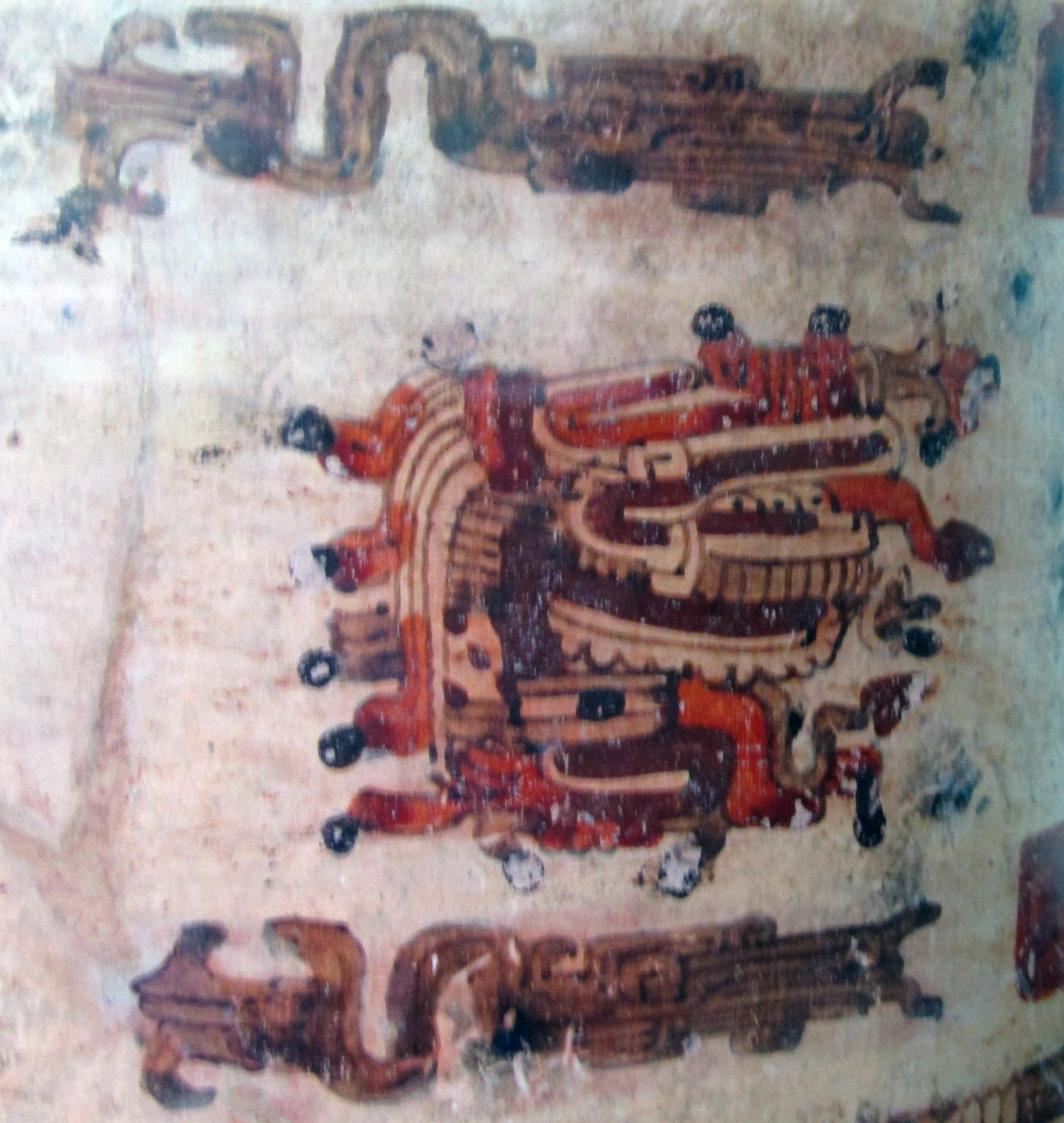
Vessel from Los Naranjos archeological park

Later on, Honduran art drew from two major indigenous cultural influences, Mesoamerican and Circum-Caribbean. When urban centers became more organized and began to gain a very important role in trade routes the Pre-Columbian peoples of Honduras developed a more sophisticated and much diverse artistic techniques of pottery, sculpture, painting, muralism, etc.

The most emblematic examples of this type of pre-Hispanic Honduran art are found in the ruins of Mayan cities such as Copan and El Puente, due to their high degree of remains of stelae, sculptures, carvings, and decorative ornaments such as jade for use in jewelry. In these Mayan cities, the painting techniques were perfected, which were characterized by using pigments with bright colors. Some Mayan buildings in Honduras still have samples and fragments of the color that painted them in the past, and it is known that there may have been Codex which existed in cities like Copán, but as of now, none have been found or preserved.

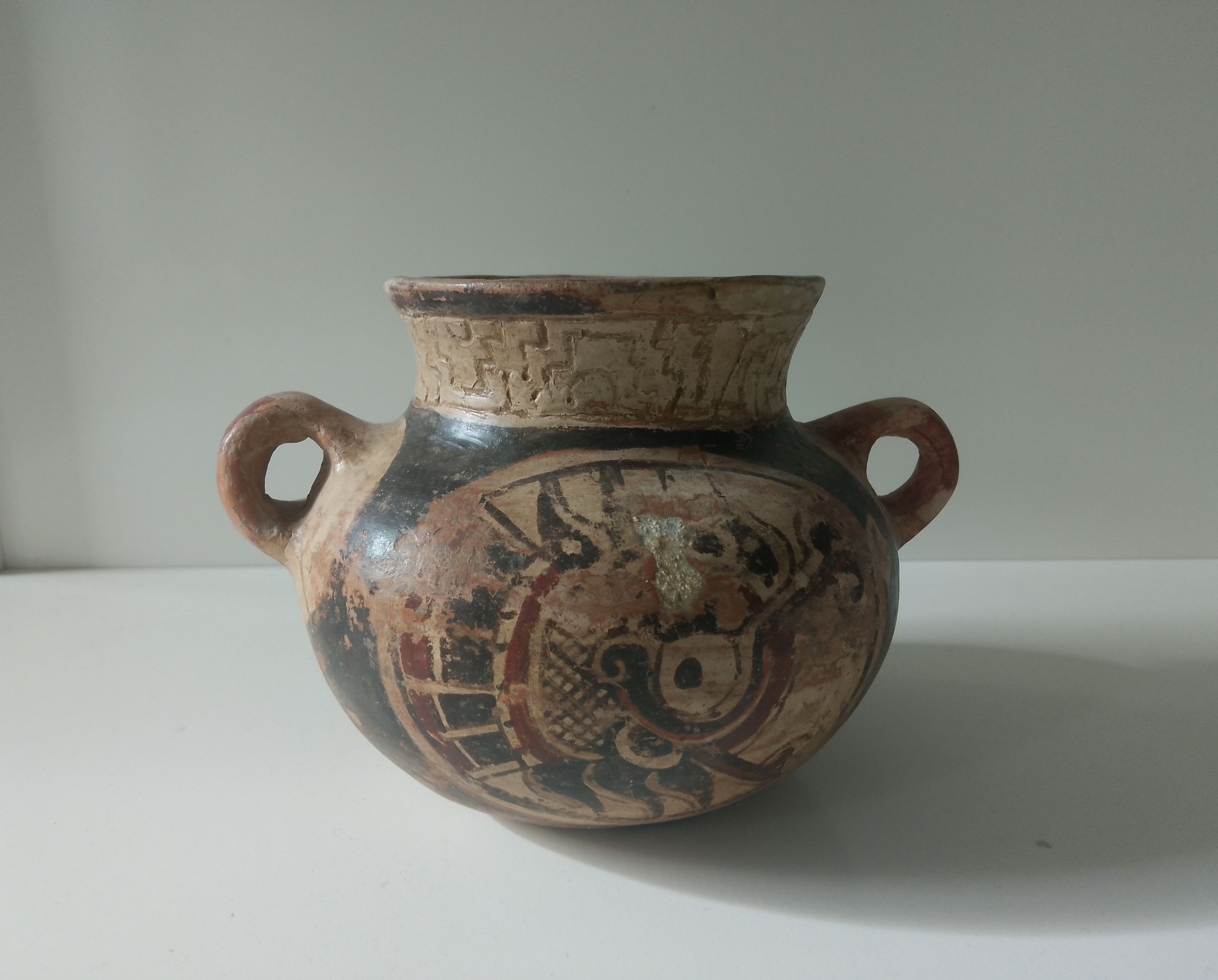
Lenca Pot from Comayagua department.

Another Mesoamerican people in Honduras that developed a sophisticated type of art were the Lencas. Various museums have diverse pieces of polychrome pottery from this people made during the pre-classical and classical periods. The other indigenous peoples such as the Chorotegas, Pech, Tolupan, and Tawakha developed their own pottery and polychrome styles, adapting to their own styles and cultural reality in Honduran territory before the Spanish conquest.

Architecture stood out greatly due to pre-Hispanic people making use of stone-based construction techniques. In addition to the Mayan cities found in Honduras, there are archaeological remains of other cultures such as the Lencas and the Pech, who also used to build pyramidal structures and plazas. Though these cultures had different architectural techniques: Mayan pyramids were full of stone carvings and were taller and more pointed than Lenca pyramids, which were flatter and wider. The peoples of circum-Caribbean tradition, like the Pech, tended to use smaller platforms but built their works closer to one another.

=== Gallery ===
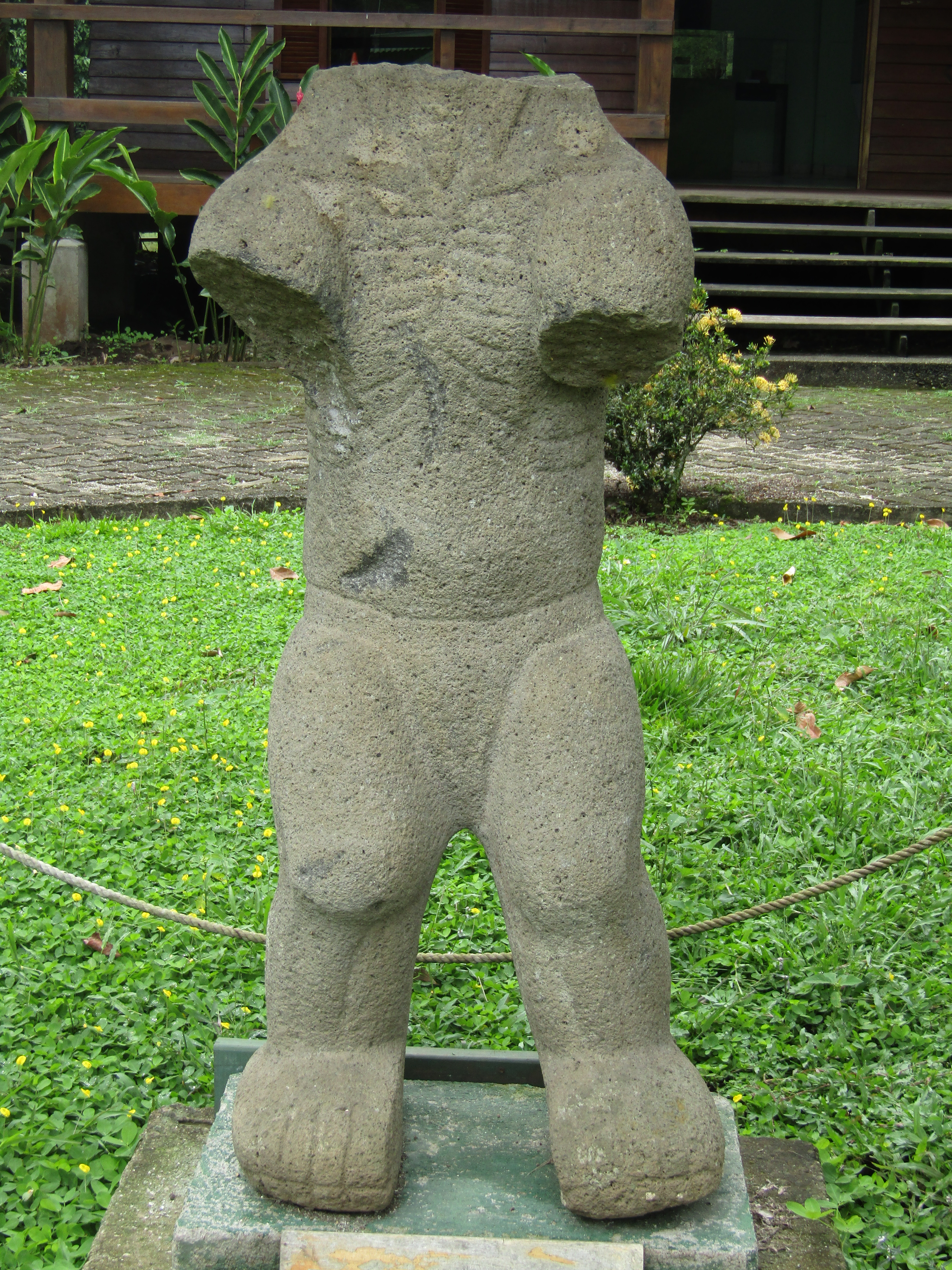
Anthropomorphic sculpture in Los Naranjos, 1000 b.C

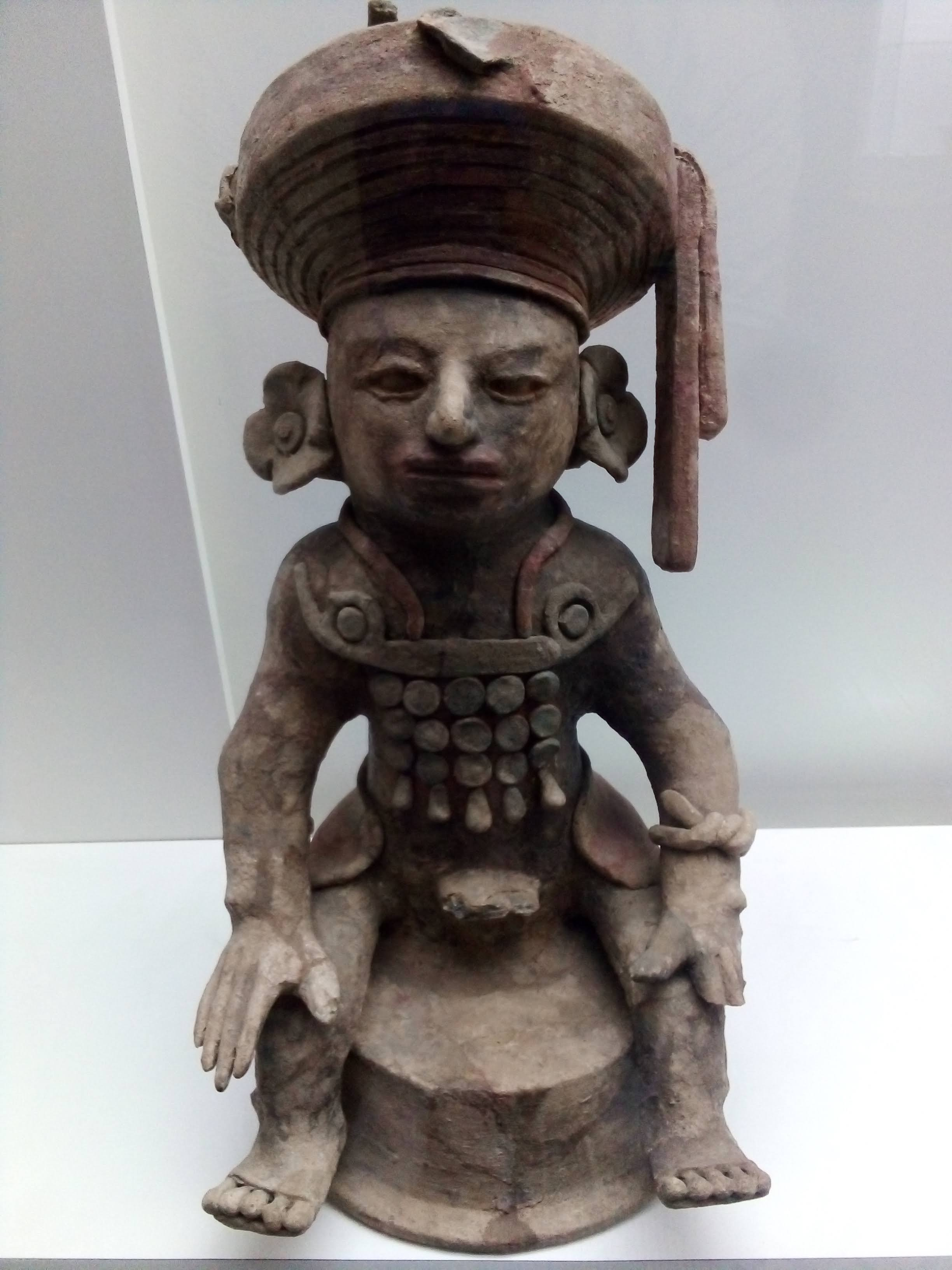
Mayan Incenciary cover, 700 a.C

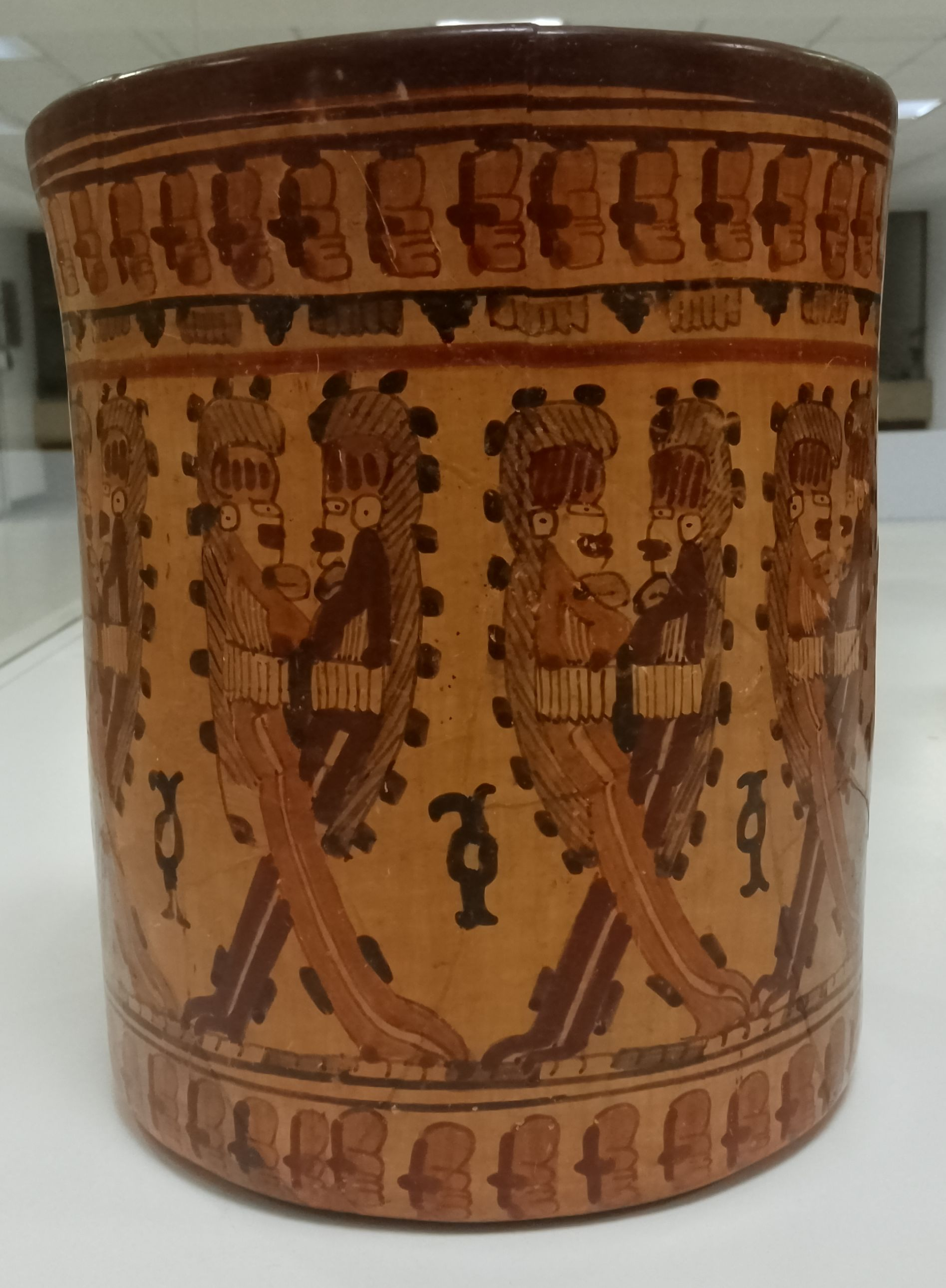
Lenca vessel from the Ulua region. 900-800 a.C

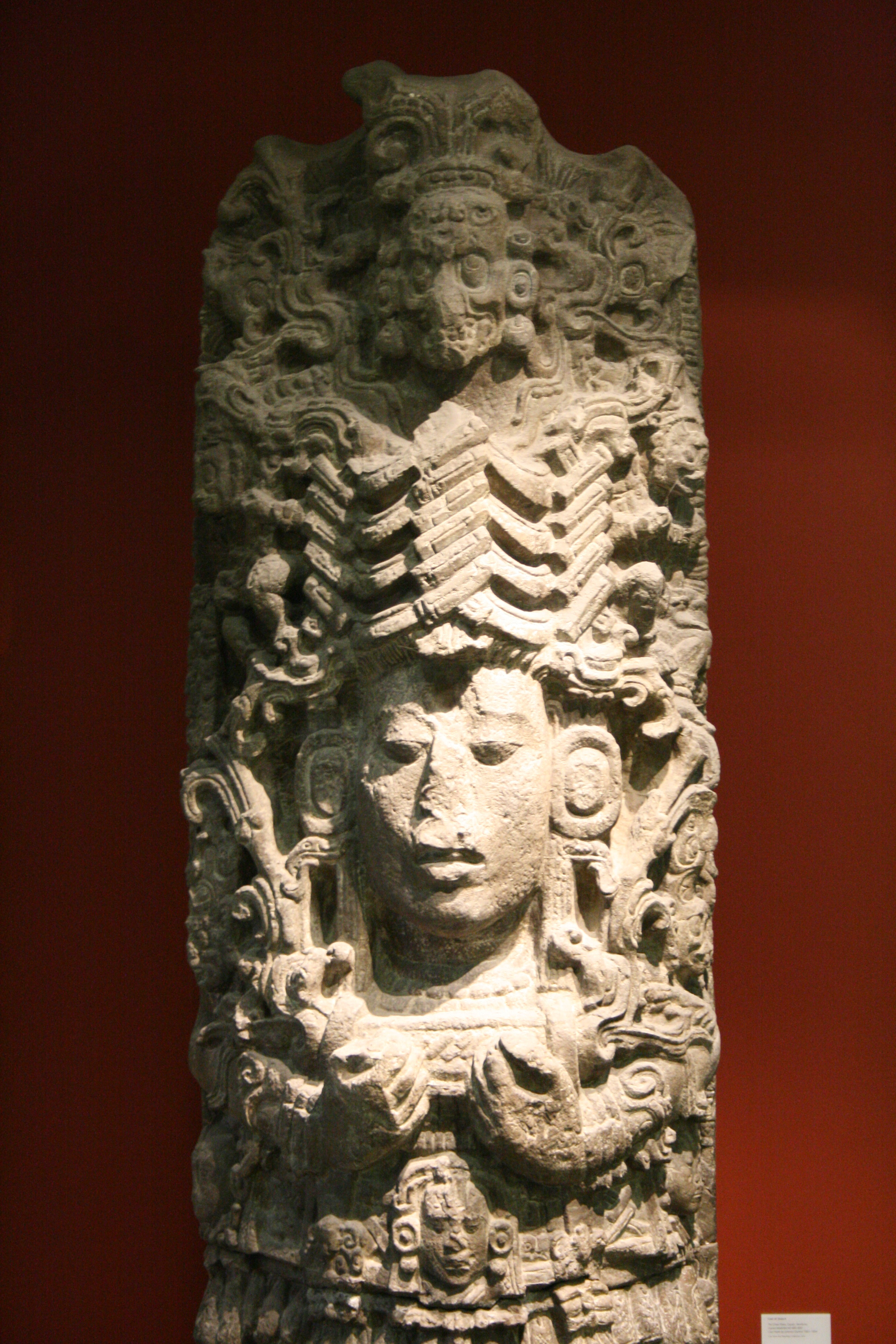
Estela A, 732 a.C

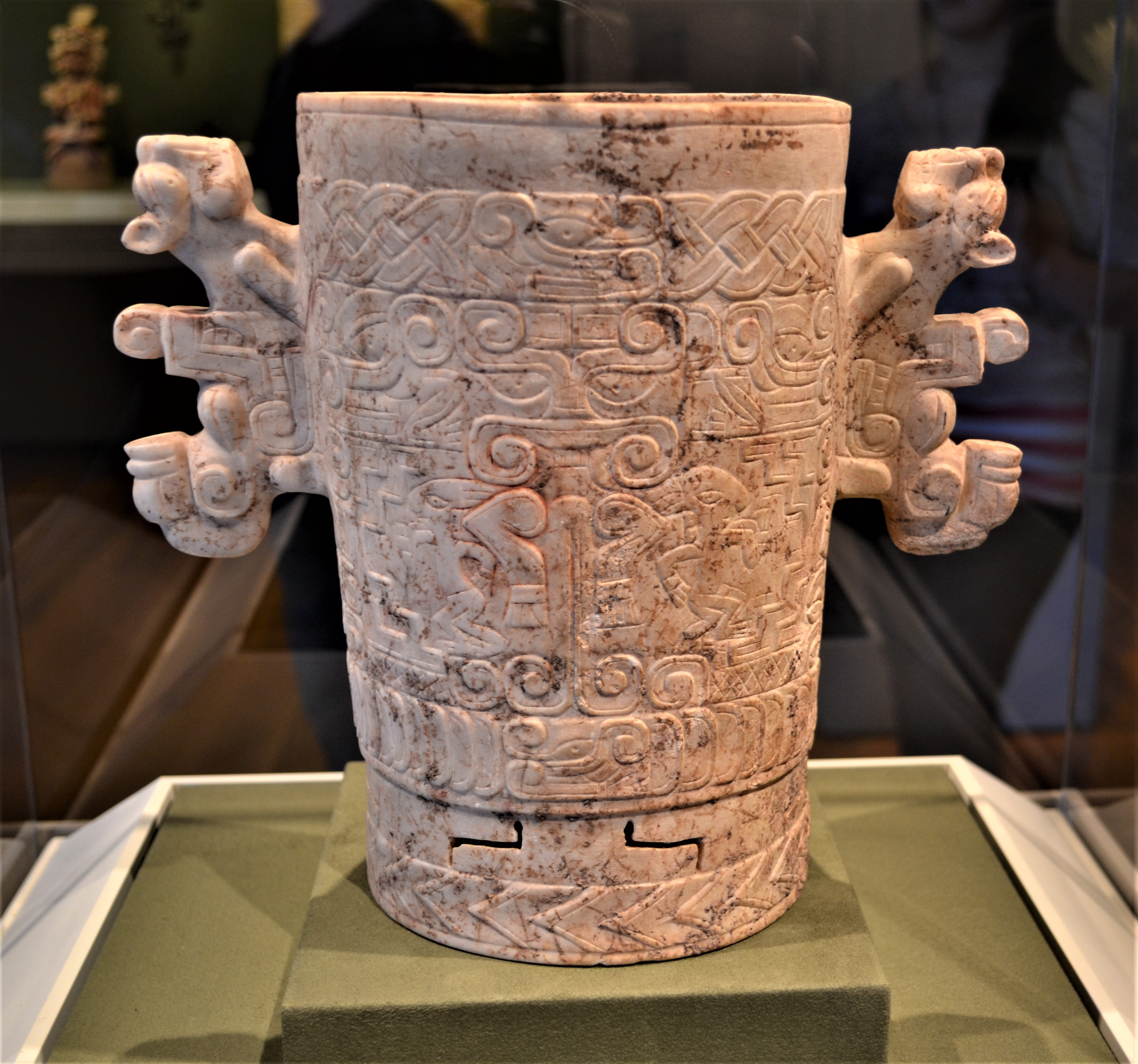
Mable Mayan Vessel, 700–1000, ac

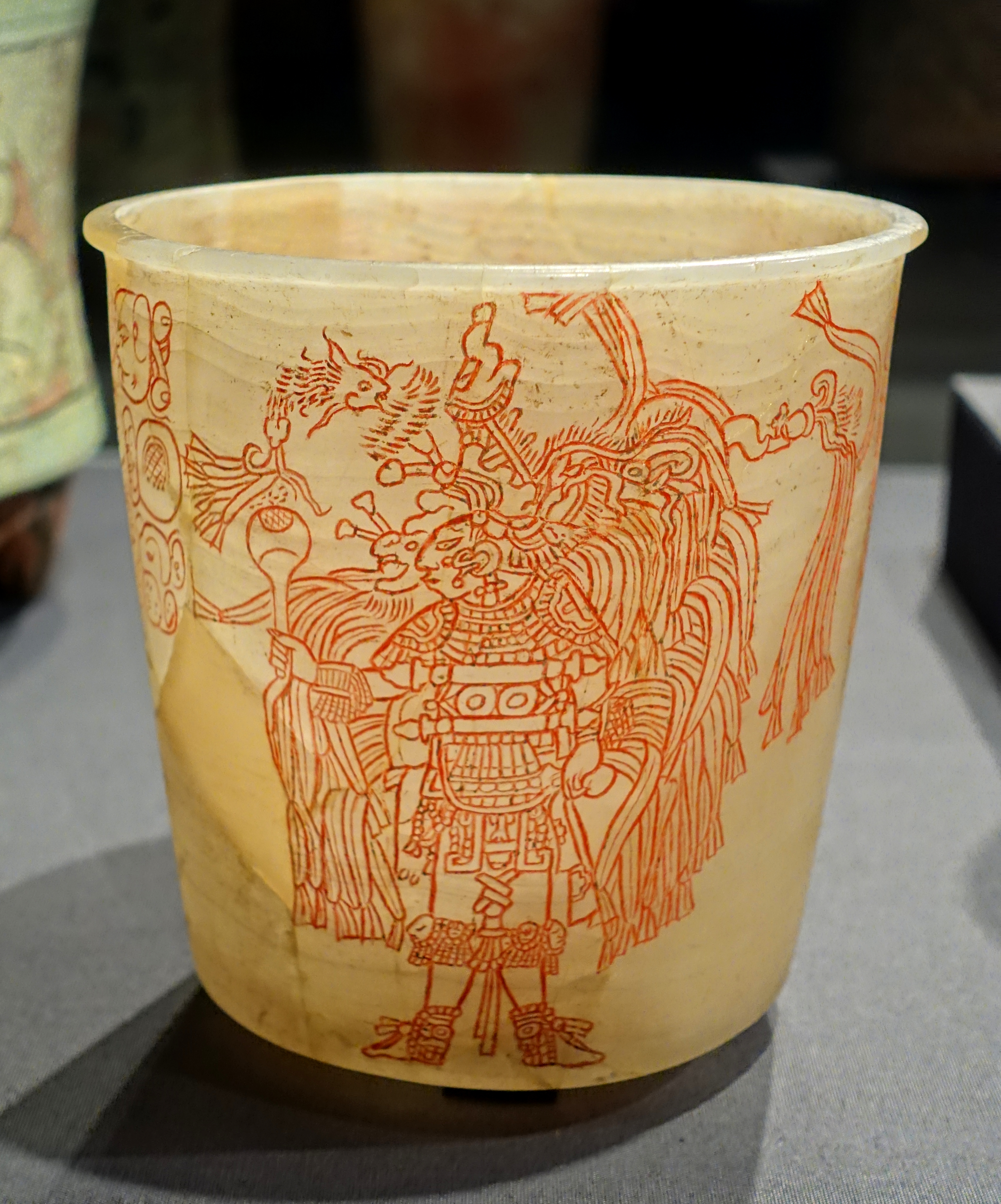
ceremonial cup, 763-820 a.C

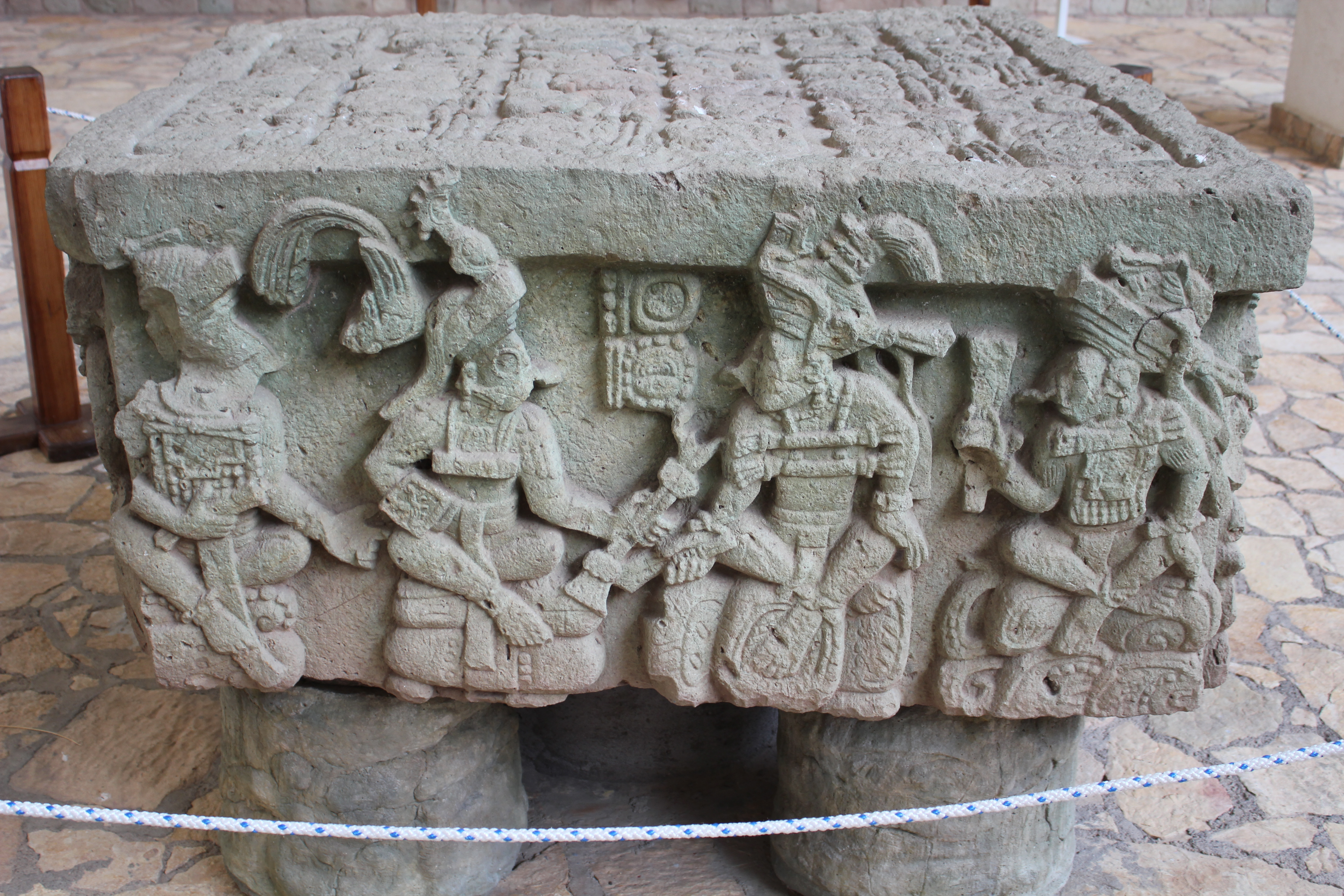
Altar Q, 776 a.C

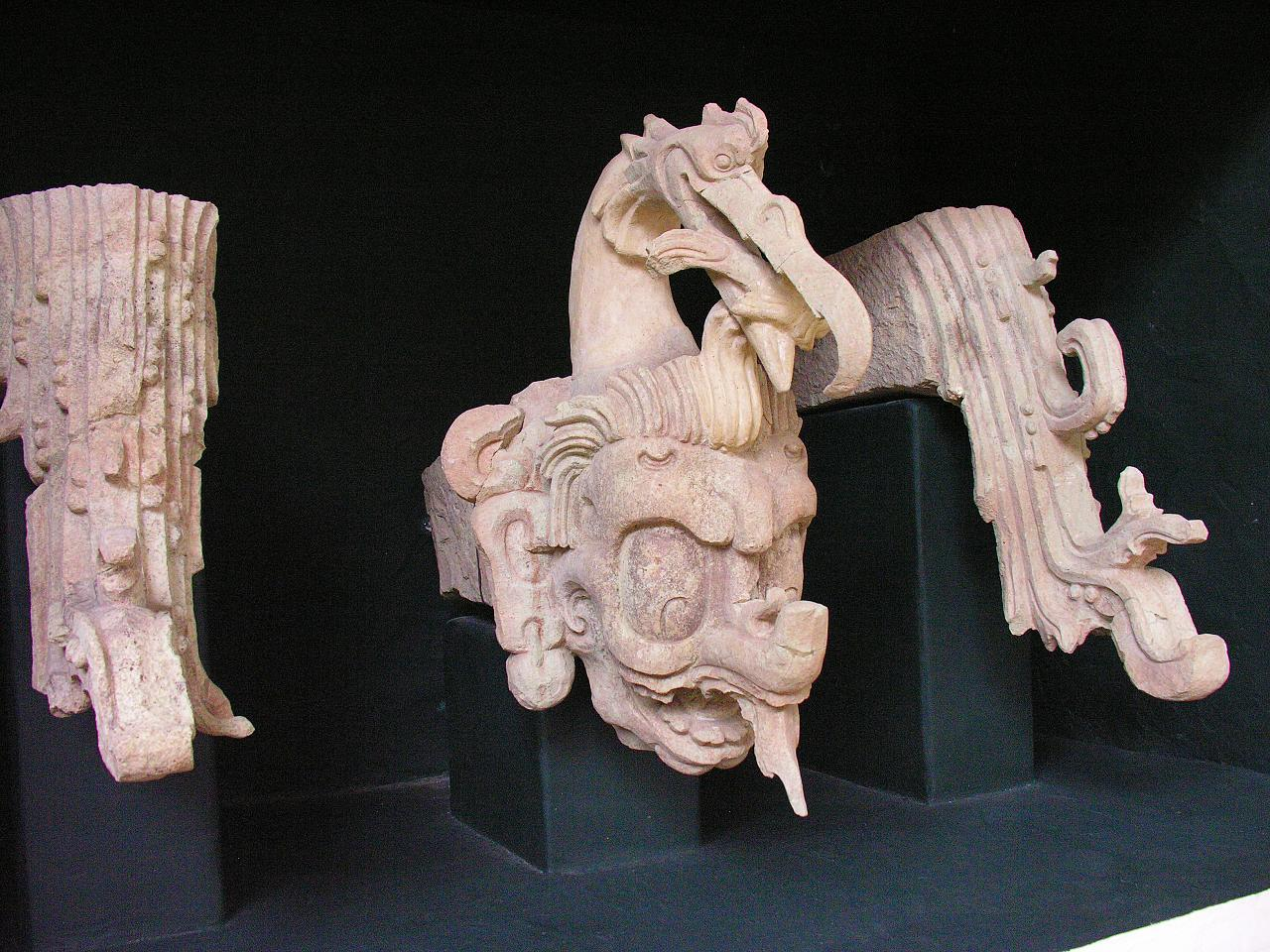
Mayan sculpture of Mayan rain god Chaac, 600-700 a.C

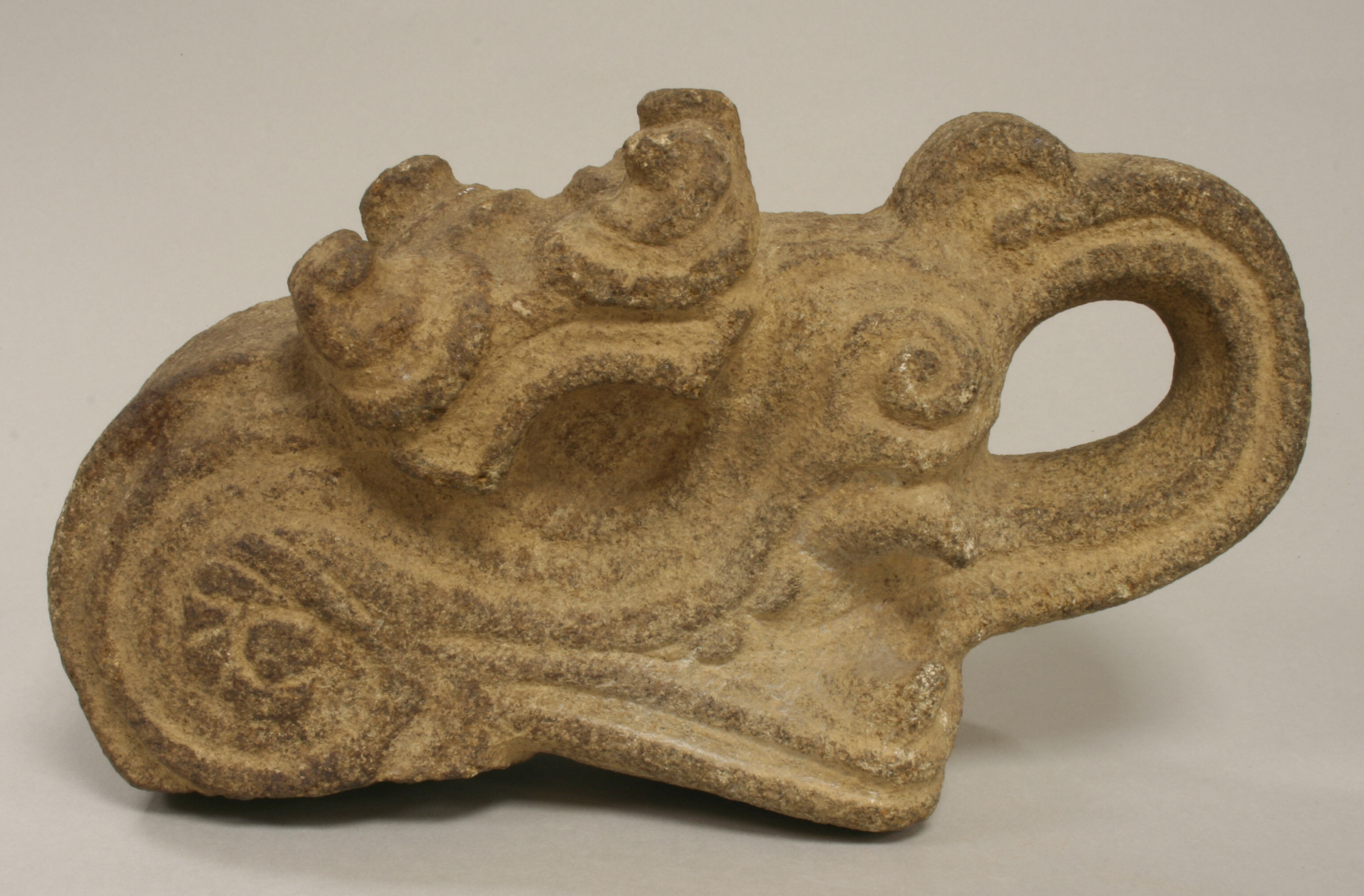
Dragon head from a Metate, 400-1000 a.C

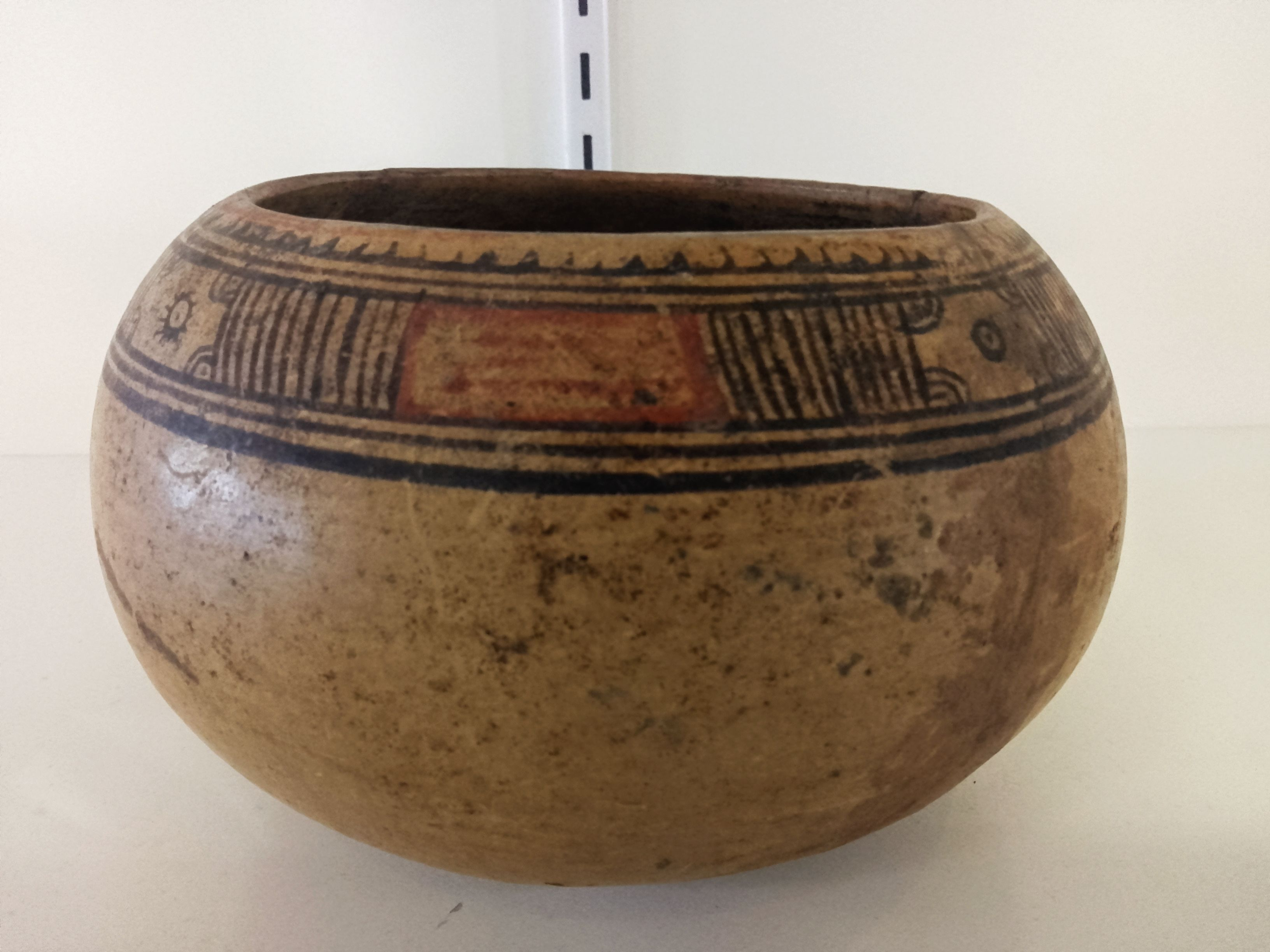
Chorotega Vessel, 1200 a.C

== Colonial art (1539–1821) ==
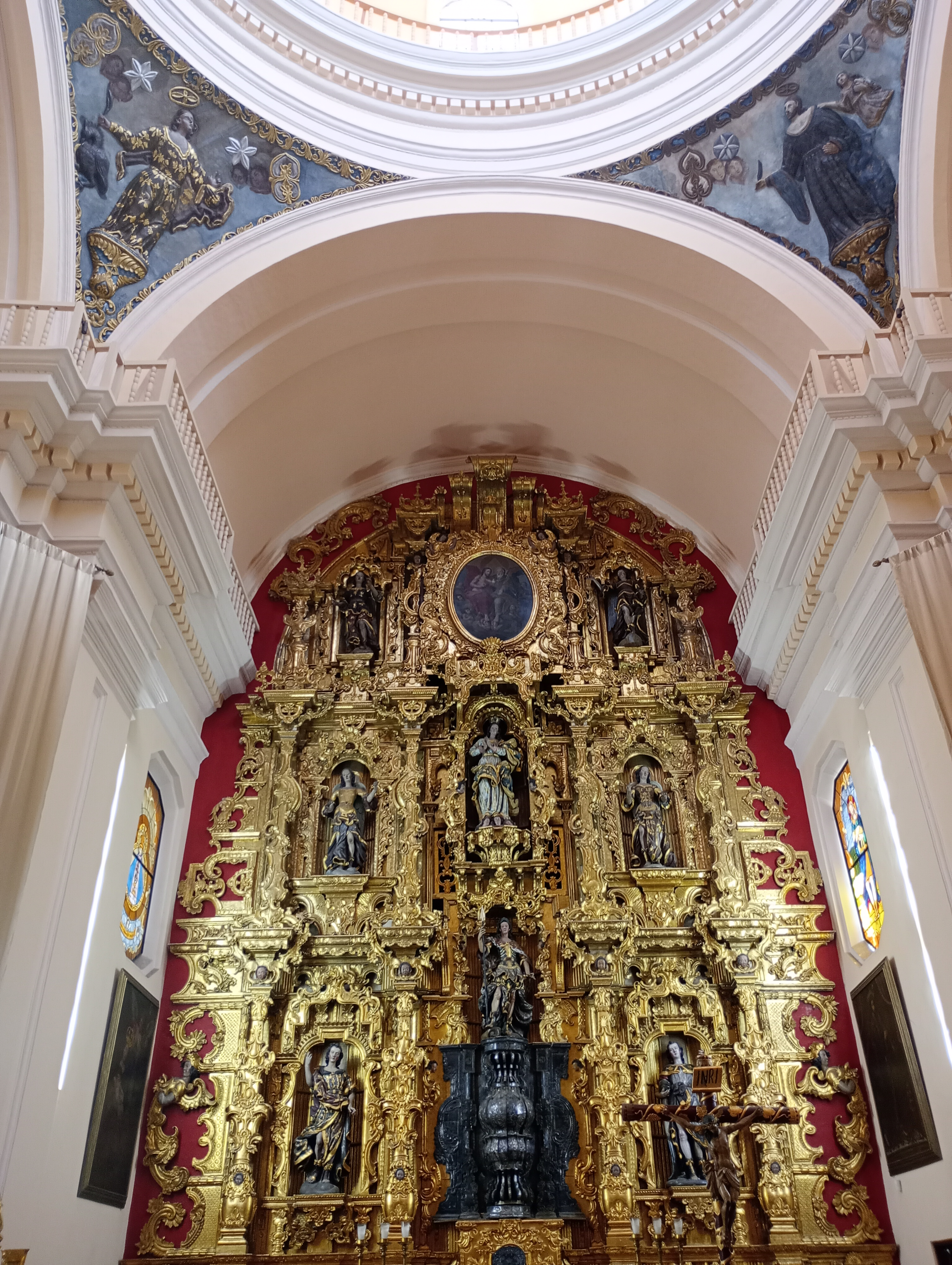
Main altarpiece of St.Michael archangel Metropolitan Cathedral.

Spanish colonial art in Honduras began to develop once the process of conquests and colonization of the territory began to consolidate, although by the middle of the 16th century with the founding of cities by the conquerors, churches, which held Roman Catholic artistic pieces, began to be built. Colonial art was mainly religious, but had indigenous elements as a result of the syncretism between the local culture and the European elements of the Spanish settlers.

Due to the syncretism, Honduras' mid-16th century art scene mainly consisted of art within the New Spanish Baroque style, which was present throughout the viceroyalty of New Spain. This offshoot of the Spanish baroque style, a product of the Counter-Reformation, New Spanish Baroque also drew on American elements. This style can be found in most of the country's paintings and altarpieces of the time.

The baroque style in colonial America also had a significant role in the conversion of indigenous peoples to Christianity. The Catholic Church, together with the colonial authorities, used baroque art and architecture's mixture of Christian and indigenous art as a tool to attract and evangelize the indigenous populations.

At the height of Spanish rule, the Hispanic cities of the Americas began to flourish as cultural centers. Honduras was no exception to this, with constructions of various churches, monasteries, and other structures important regions, such as Comayagua and Tegucigalpa, giving a more picturesque quality to the cities and allowing them to especially grow artistically and architecturally. Training Honduran artists often were taught by Spanish teachers and often took aspects from their style.

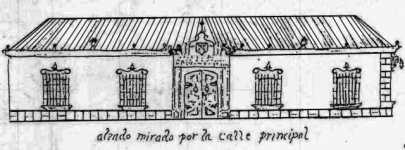
Original plan of the Caxa Real, an example of Spanish colonial architecture.

During the late 18th century and early 19th century, the last decades of the Spanish empire, the influences of other artistic styles such as Rococo, a product of French influence coming from the Bourbon dynasty that began to reign the Spanish empire from the 18th century, and neoclassical, an alternative style that sought to vindicate the style of the Greco-Roman cultures in Europe.

=== Gallery ===
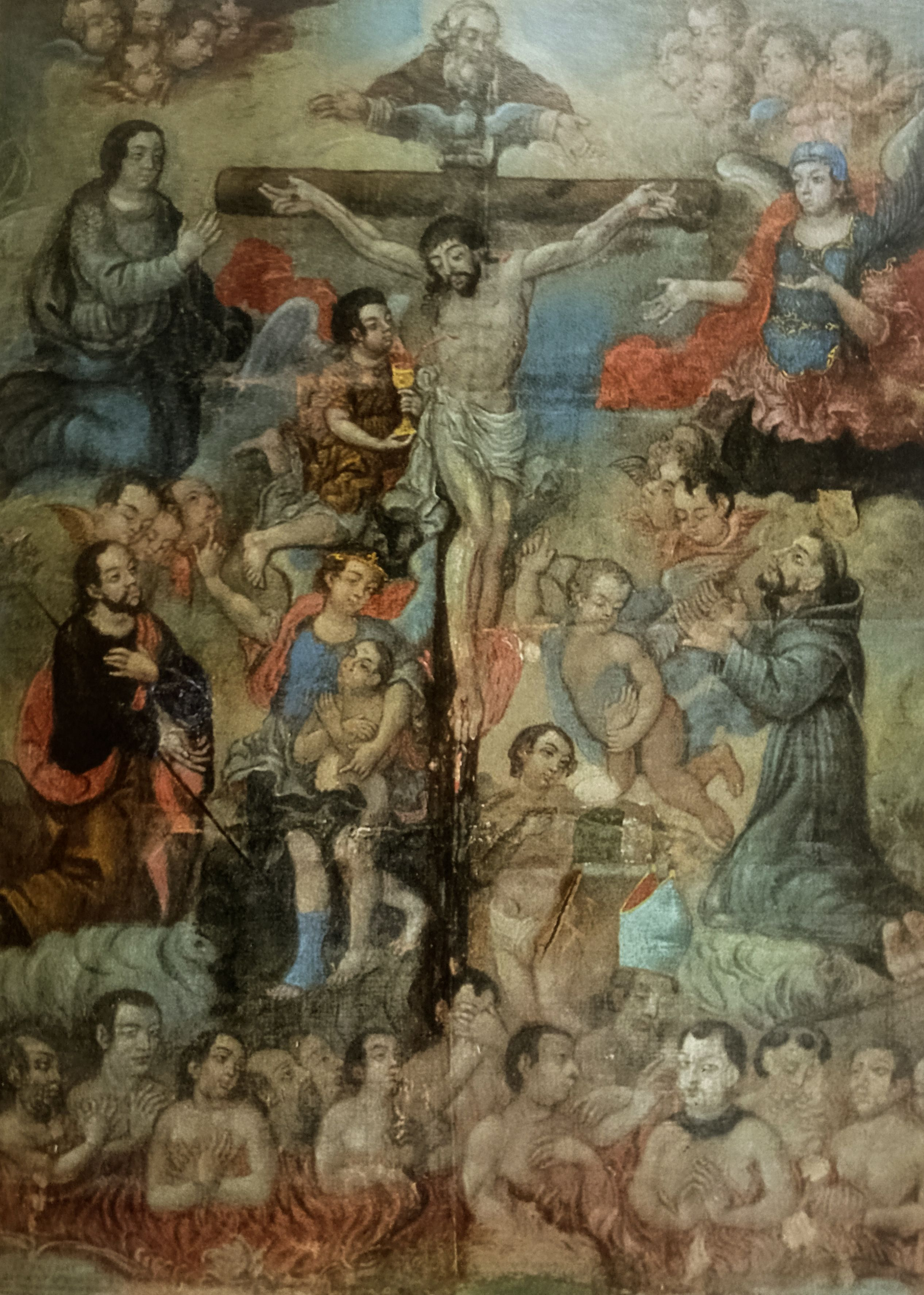
Baroque painting of the Crucifixion of Christ

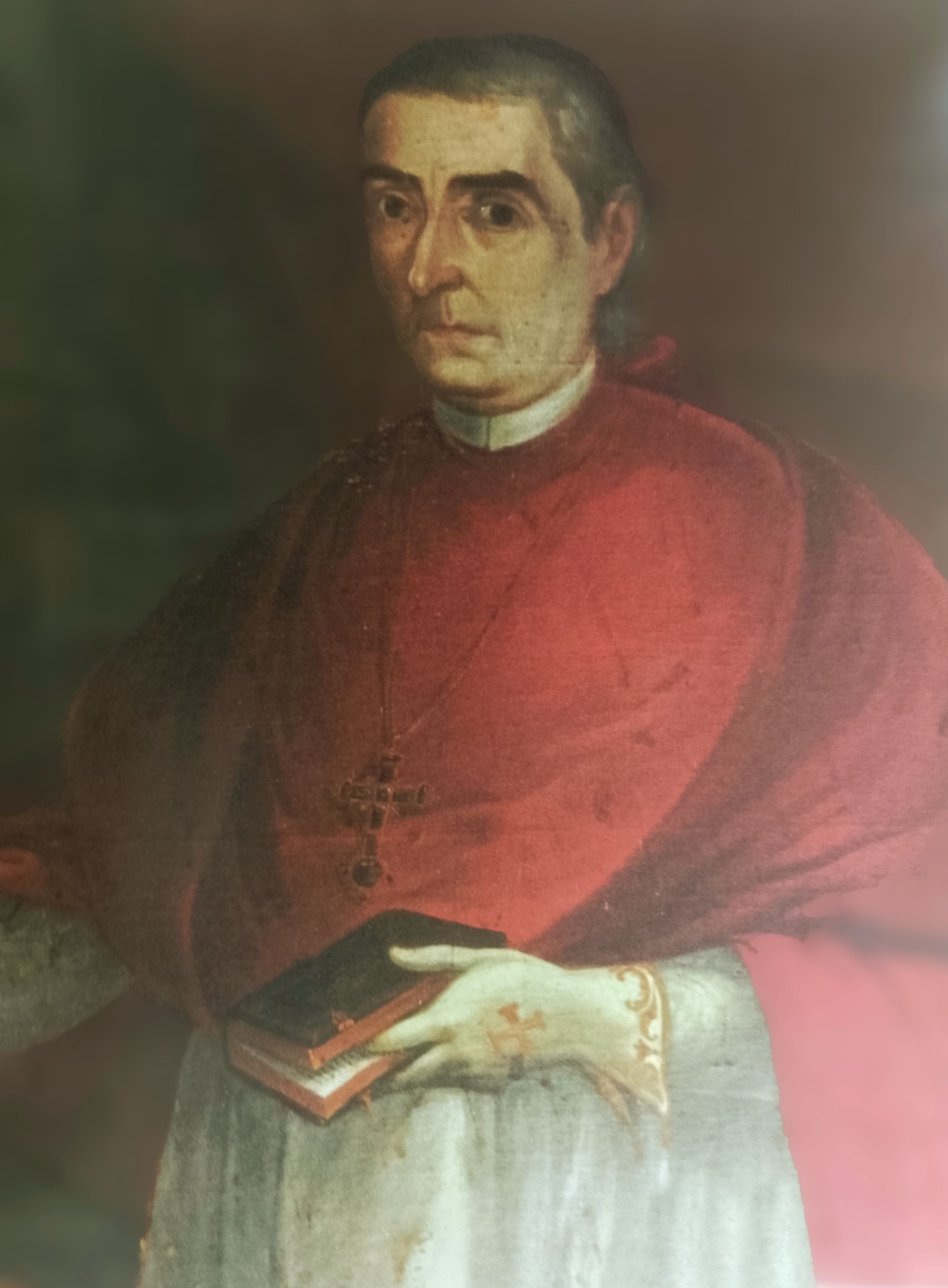
Portrait of José de Palencia.

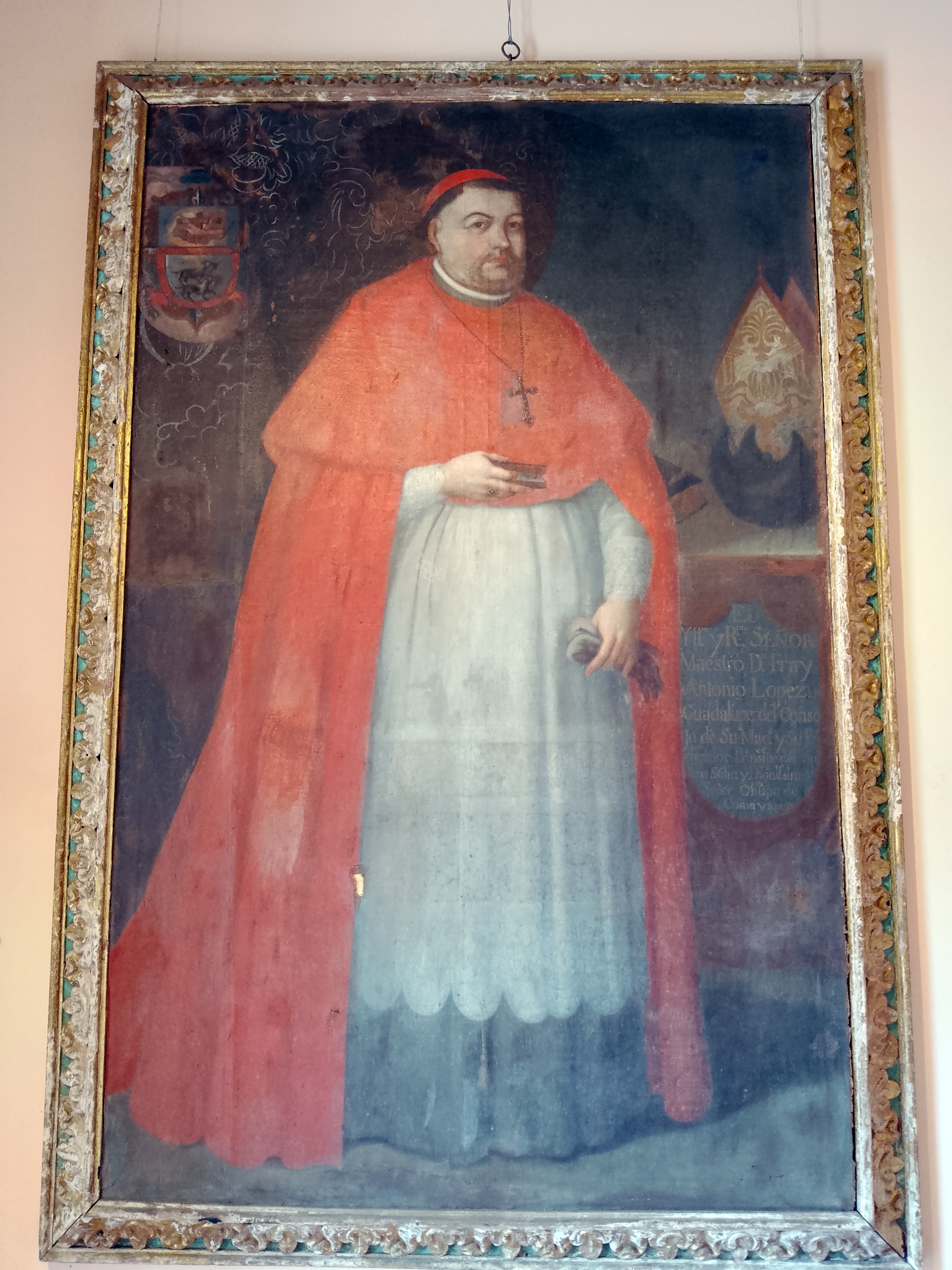
Portrait of Fray Guadalupe López Portillo.

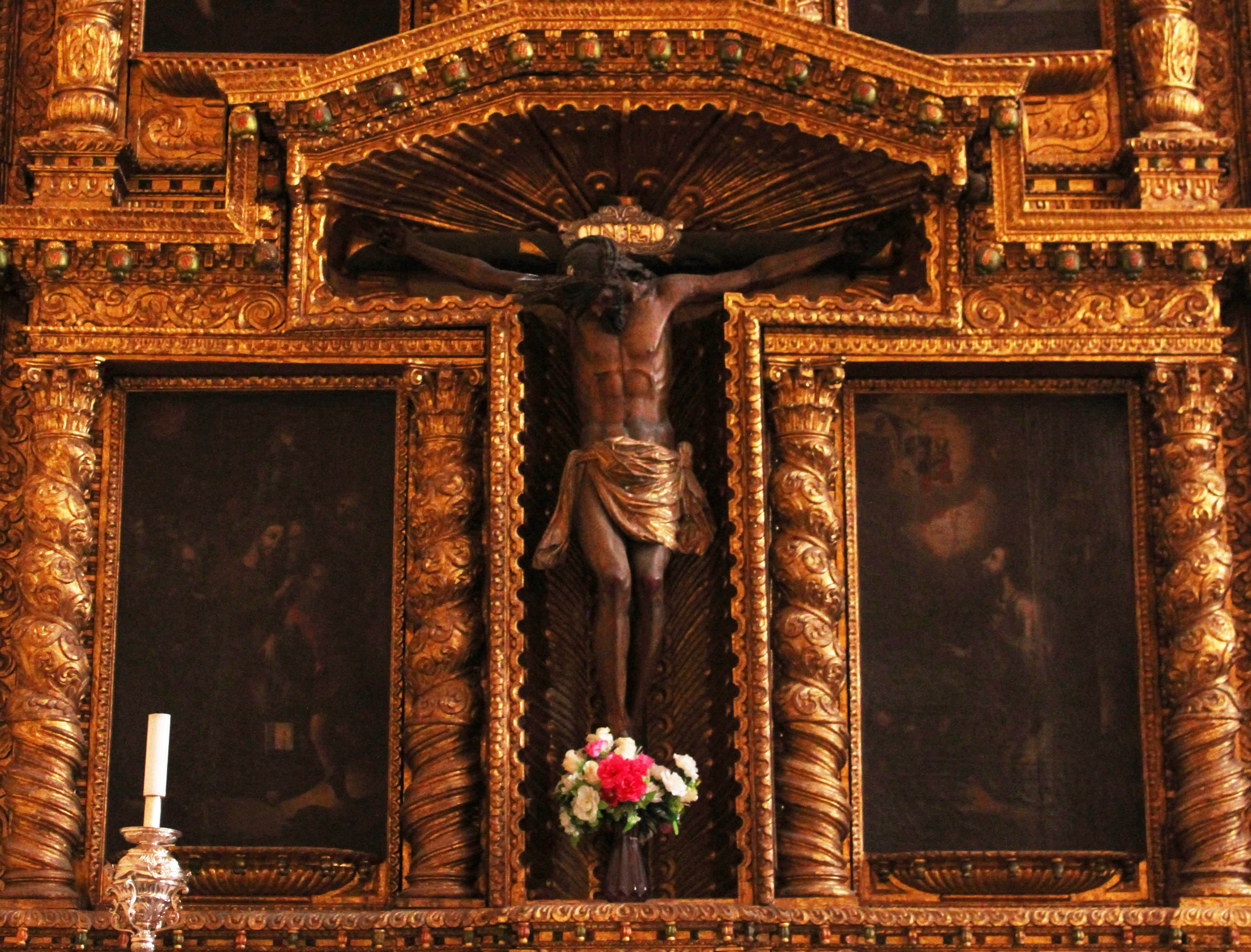
Altarpiece of the Cathedral of Immaculate Conception

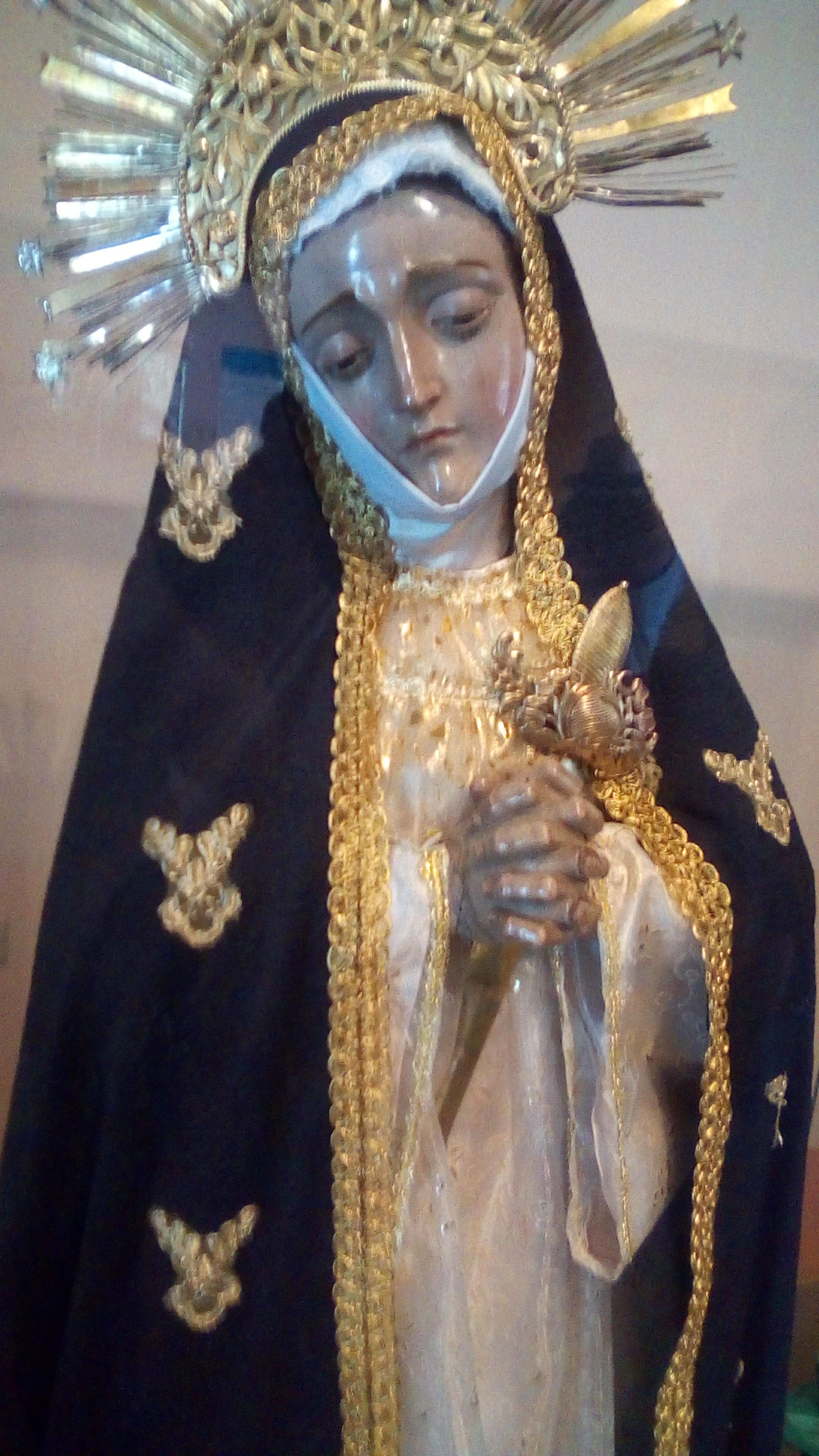
Statue of the Virgin of Mercy

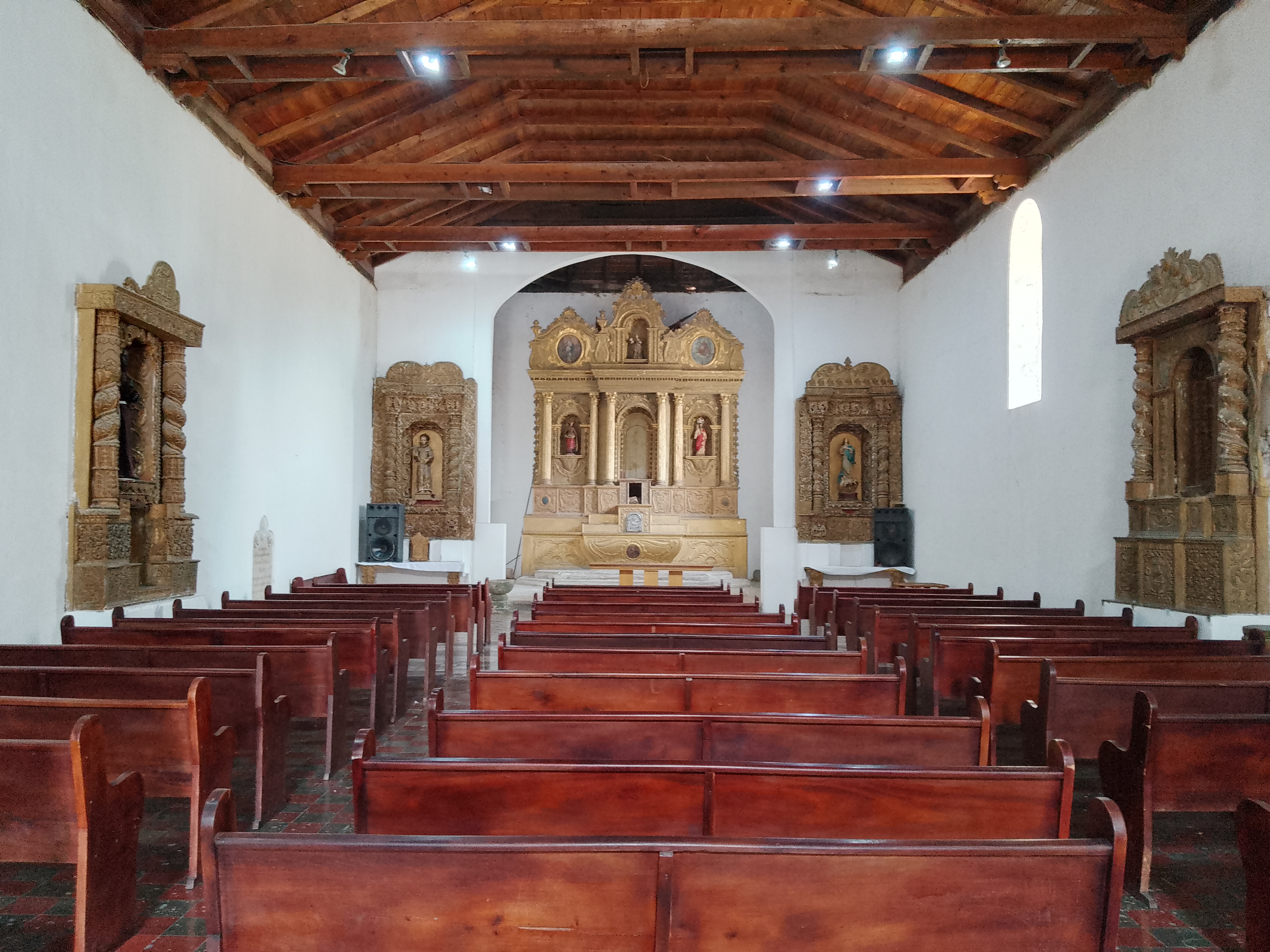
Inside San Francisco Church

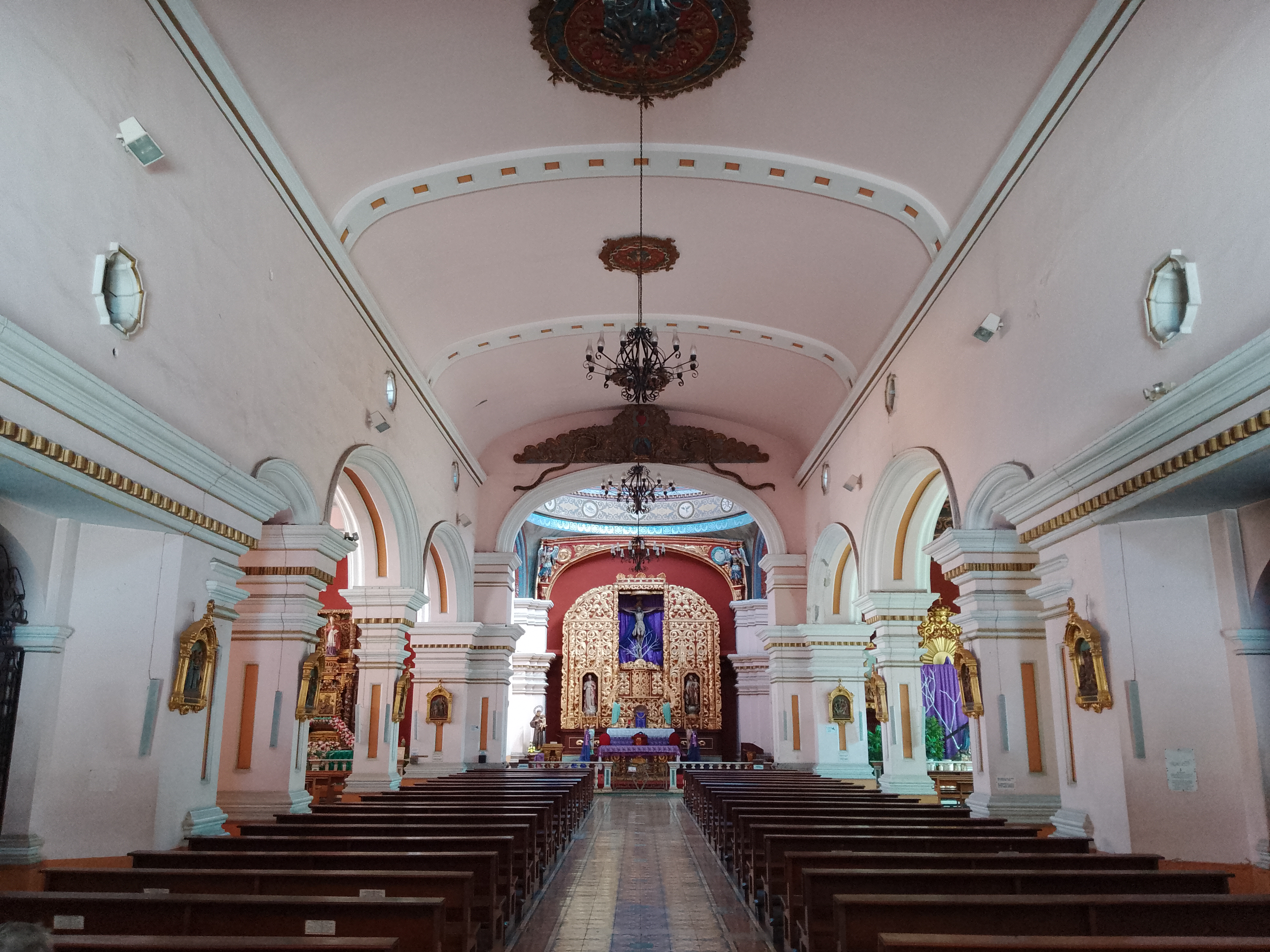
Interior of Los Dolores Church

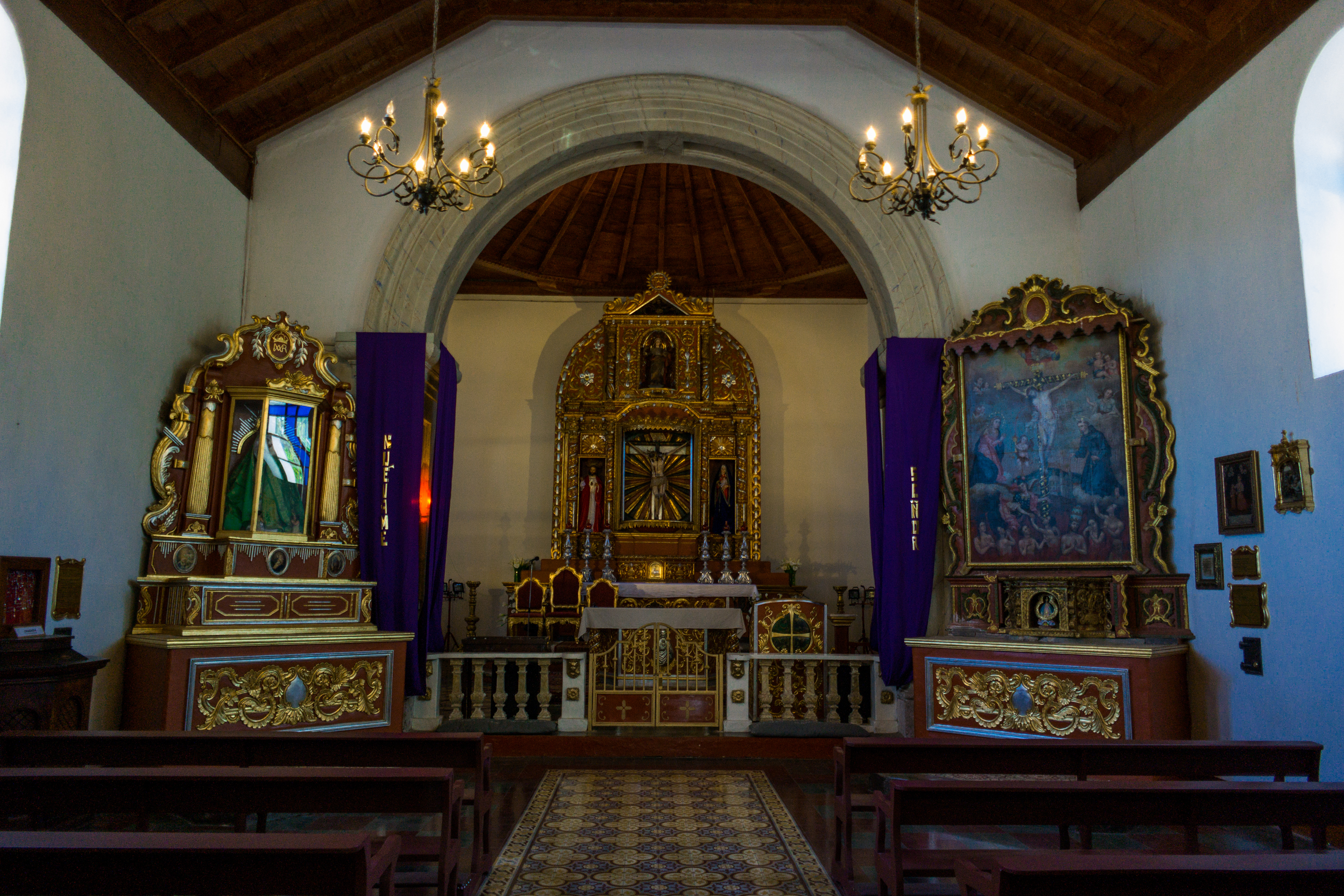
Interior of Santa Lucia Church.

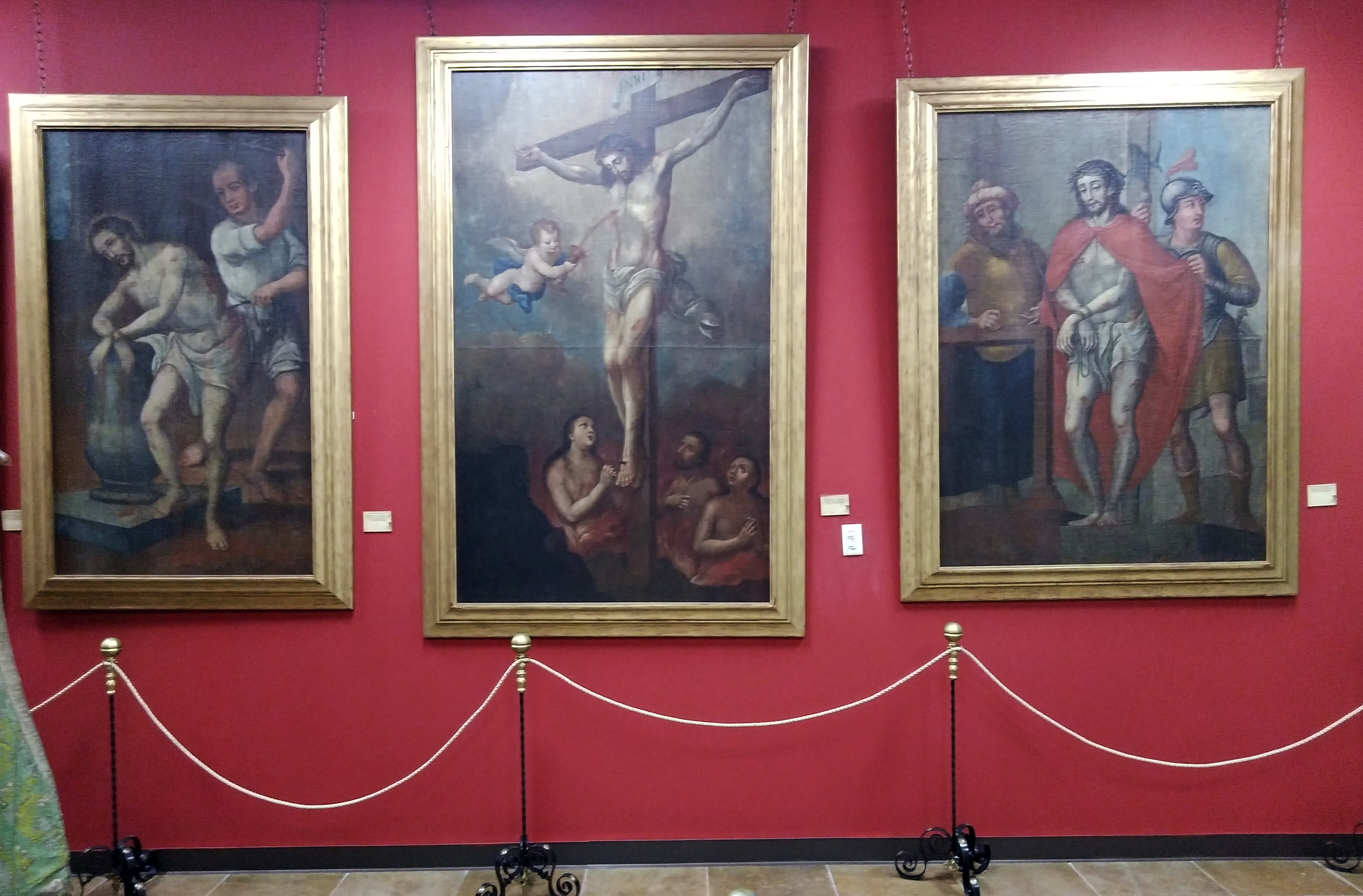
Colonial paintings from the Museum of The Cathedral of Tegucigalpa.

== Republican art (1823-today) ==
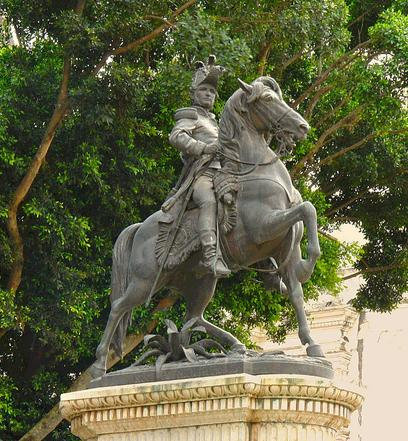
Statue of Francisco Morazán in Tegucigalpa.

After independence, Honduras went through many changes, from briefly being a province of the First Mexican Empire to being part of the Central American Federation, eventually becoming independent from it in 1838. From then on, there was a period of attempted consolidation as a republican state, and in terms of social system and culture, it was not very different from what it had been in colonial times. However, with the arrival of the Liberal Reform, Honduras' openness to the world resulted in an artistic and literary flourishing.

Artistic techniques from western Europe and North America began gaining influence within the country, and an increasing number of remodeling projects of public areas resulted in new statues and monuments, which honored national heroes such as General Francisco Morazán, being created. This art, more focused on nationalism, served to create a Honduran cultural identity which differentiated itself from other countries.

Western Romanticism influences began to reach Honduras through national elites in the beginning of the 20th century. This resulted in a Honduran campaign to reimagine history and create national symbols, birthing art which depicted famous images of Honduran history, such as the Battle of La Trinidad during the First Central American Civil War.

During the late 18th century, a process of construction of new buildings based on a neoclassical style heavily influenced by countries like France began to be seen; these buildings would be erected in Tegucigalpa, Comayagua, Santa Rosa, and to a lesser extent on the north coast.

=== 20th Century ===
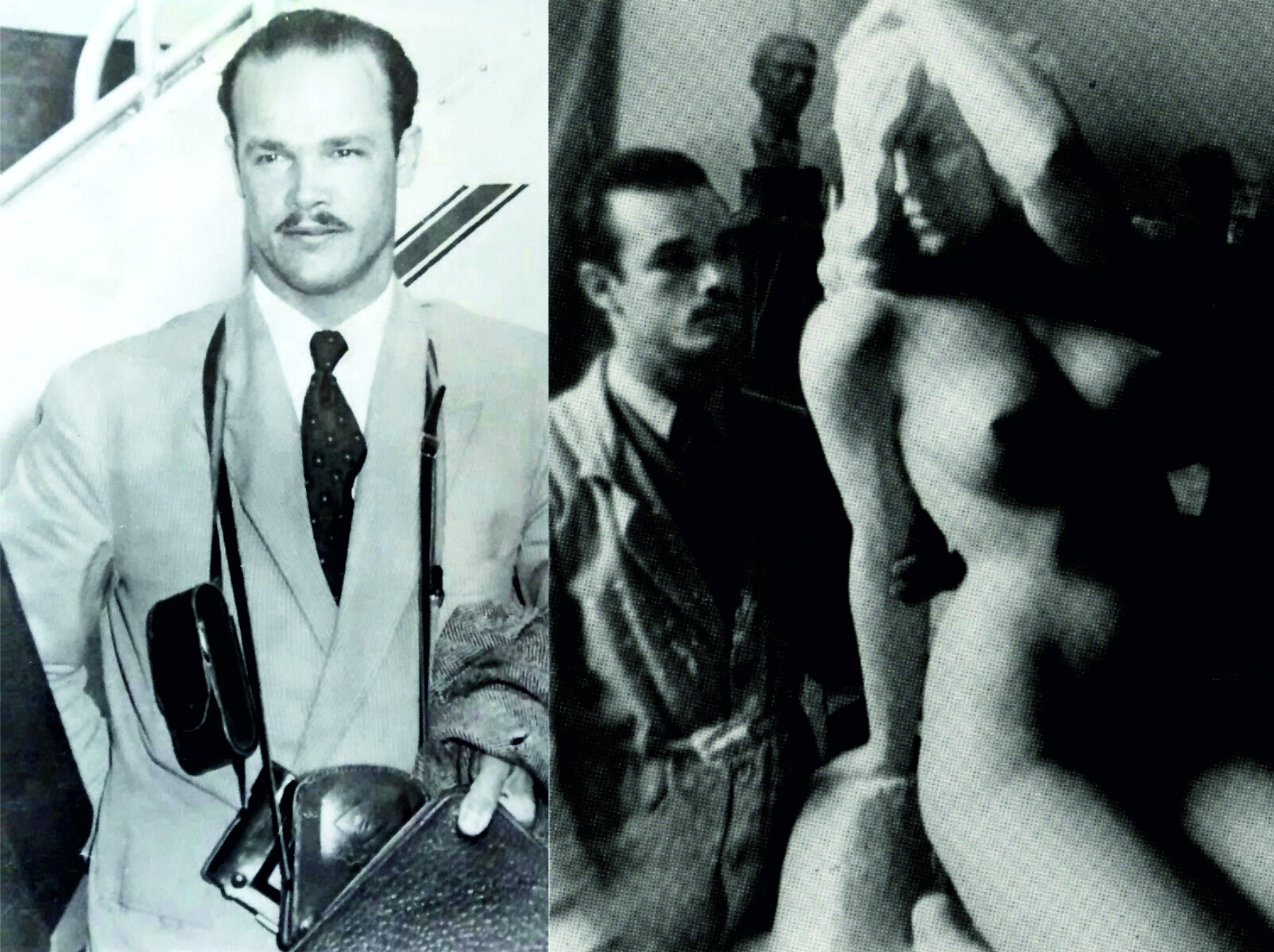
Mario Zamora Alcántara, one of the most famous Honduran sculptors of the 20th century, he worked in Honduras, Mexico, and the United States.

During the dictatorship of General Tiburcio Carias Andino, an attempt was made to create a Honduran identity based on the rescue of elements from the Mayan culture but emphasizing the mestizo character of the country, as a people both descended from the ancient Mayan civilization and the Spanish colonists. This movement promoted by the dictatorships was called the "Mayanization of Honduras."

With the arrival of the coups d'état and the military juntas, artistic movements of protesting began. The most famous are the cartoons that criticized the government of the country during the Cold War, in addition to paintings that rescued the indigenous past of Honduras as well as the working and peasant classes of the country. During this time, the most famous sculptor of Honduras, Mario Zamora Alcántara, would arrive, eventually creating some of the largest monumental works in the country such as the Cristo del Picacho.

Many painters would be recognized in this period for representing the country in a pictorial way. By the beginning of the 21st century, Honduras would see an artistic boom in murals, many of them focused on highlighting the social character of the political unrest occurring at the time.

=== Gallery ===
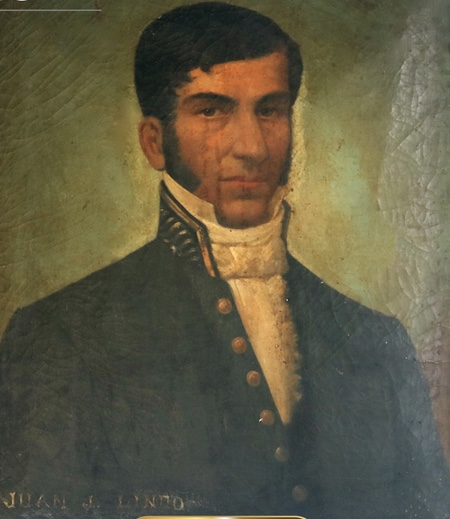
Painting of President, Juan Lindo.

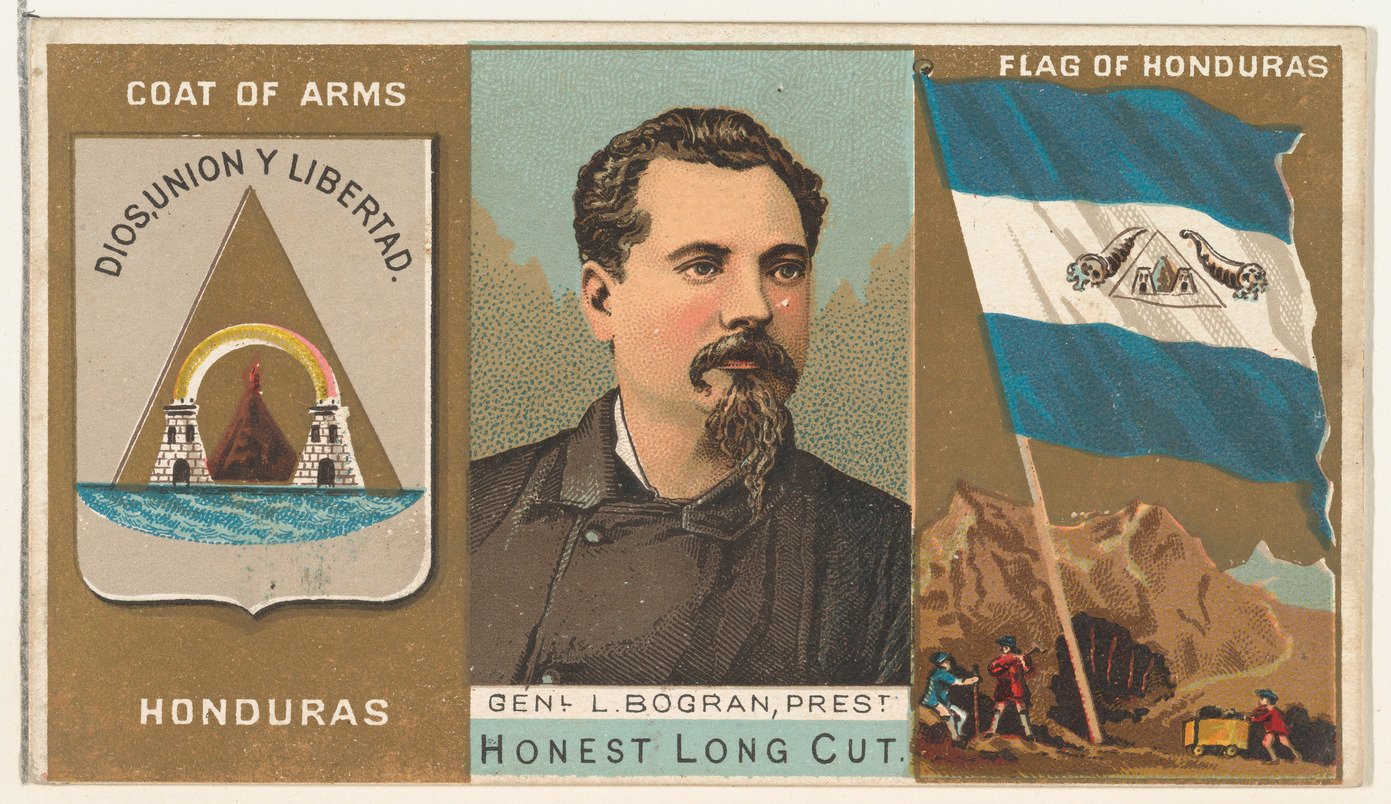
Stamp of President Bogran

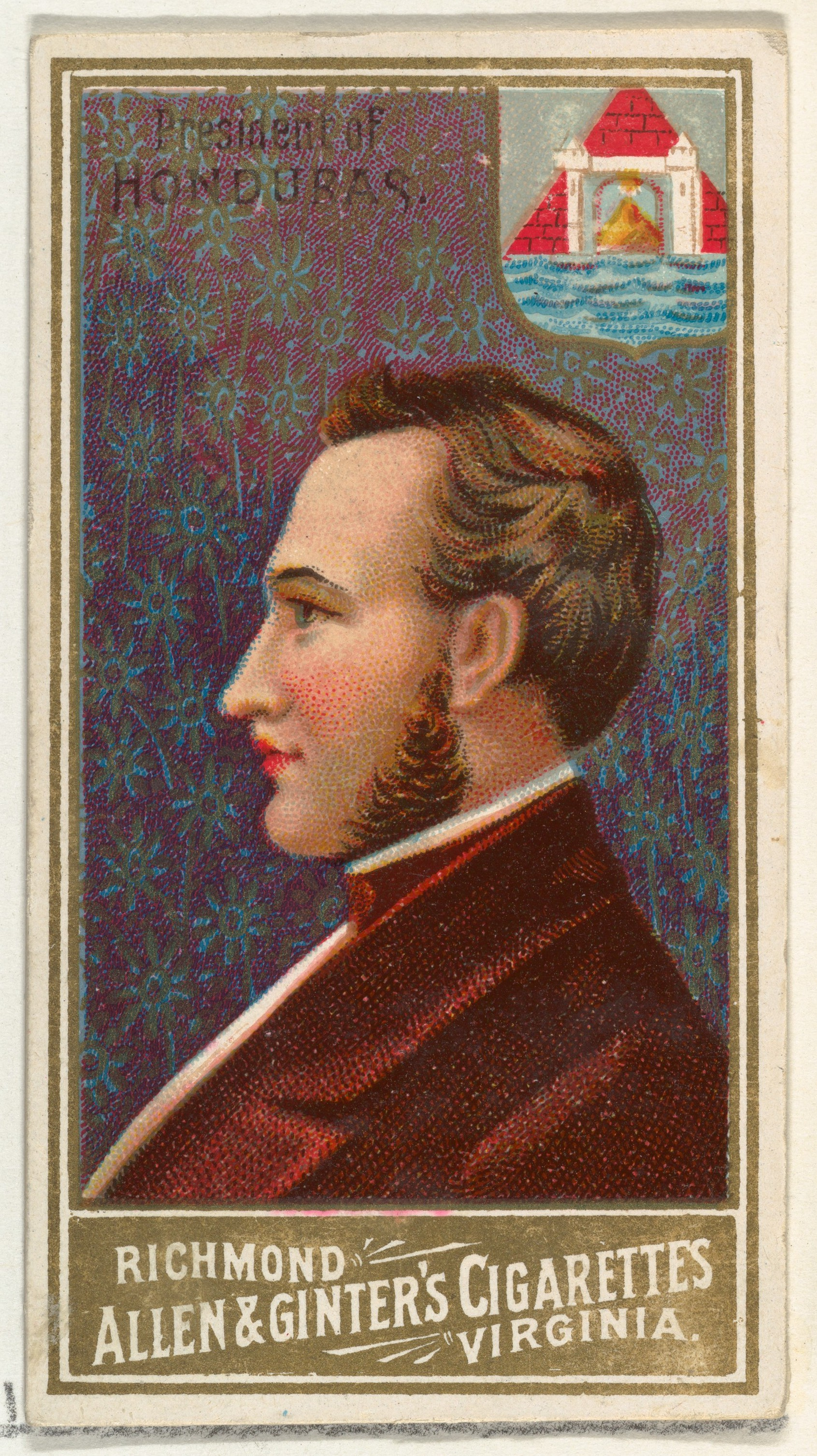
Stamp of General Morazán

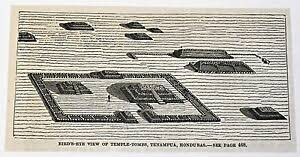
Lithograph of Tenampua Ruins,1881

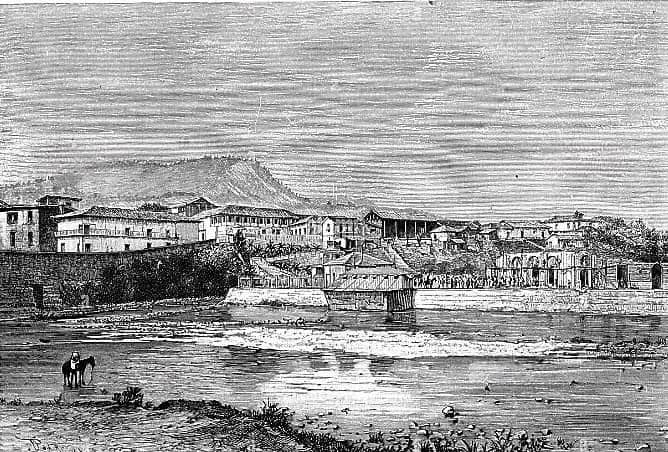
Lithograph of Tegucigalpa,1891

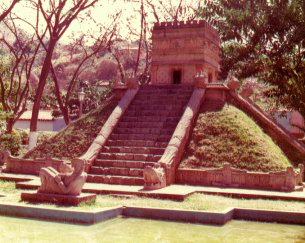
Pyramid at Parque la concordia, Tegucigalpa

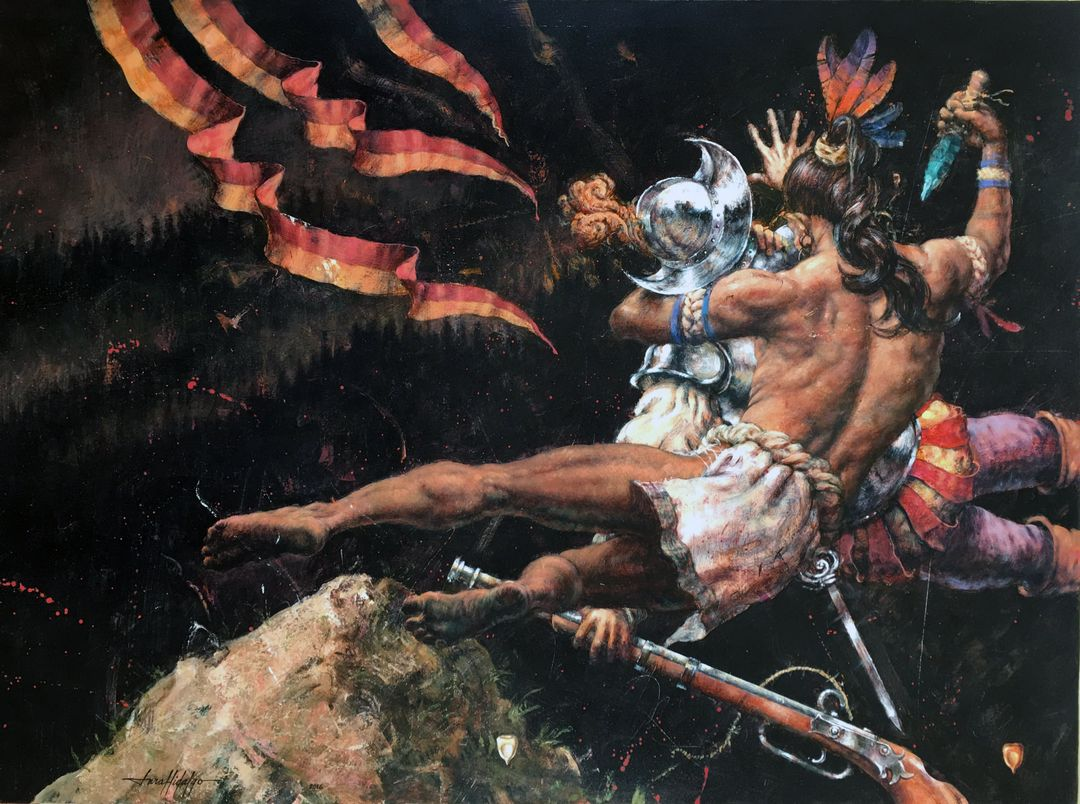
Painting of The chief Lempira, by Hidalgo Lara

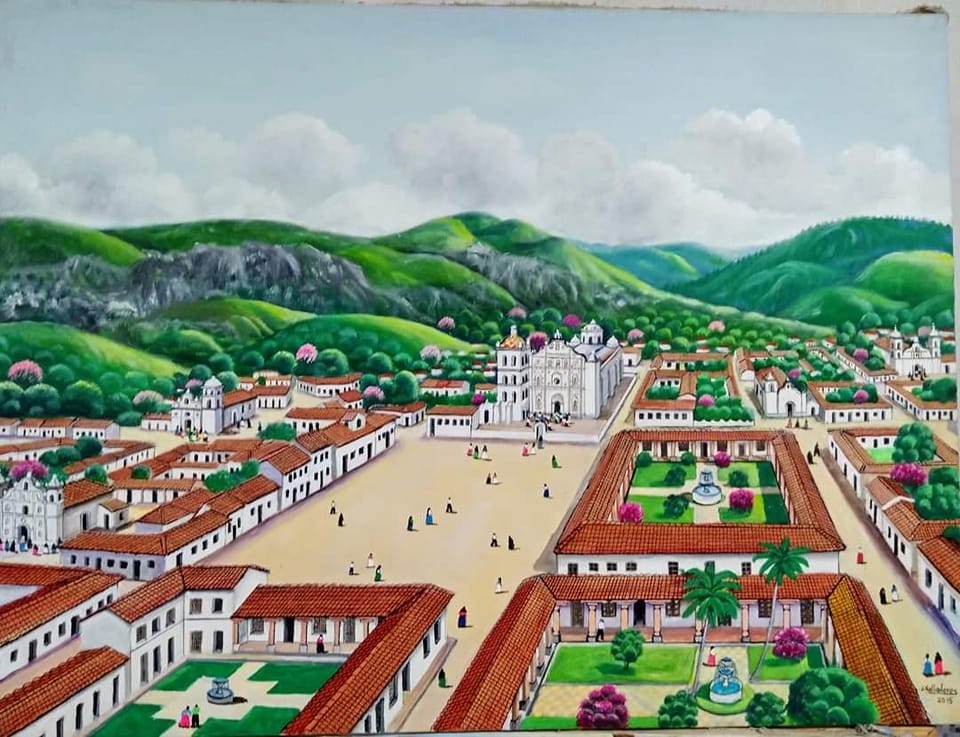
Painting of Comayagua, by Jesús Valladares Tejeda

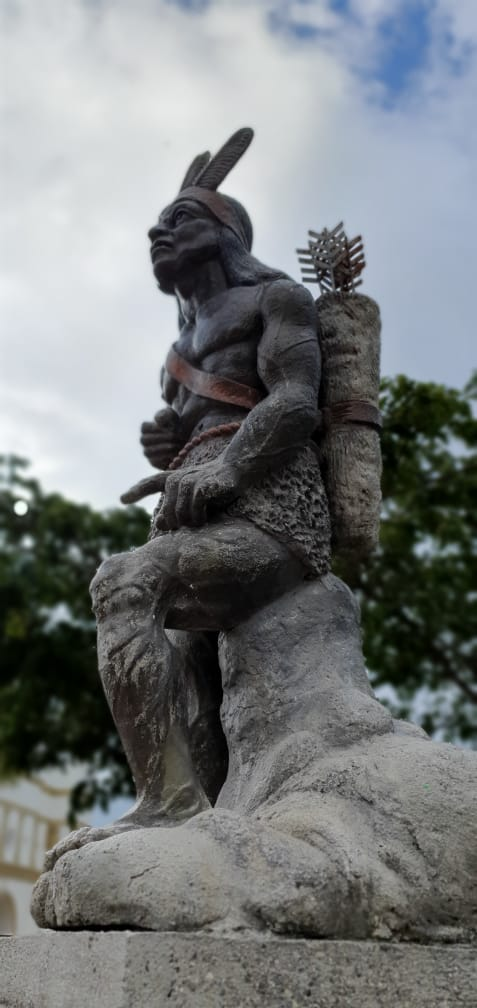
Lempira Monument

== Music ==
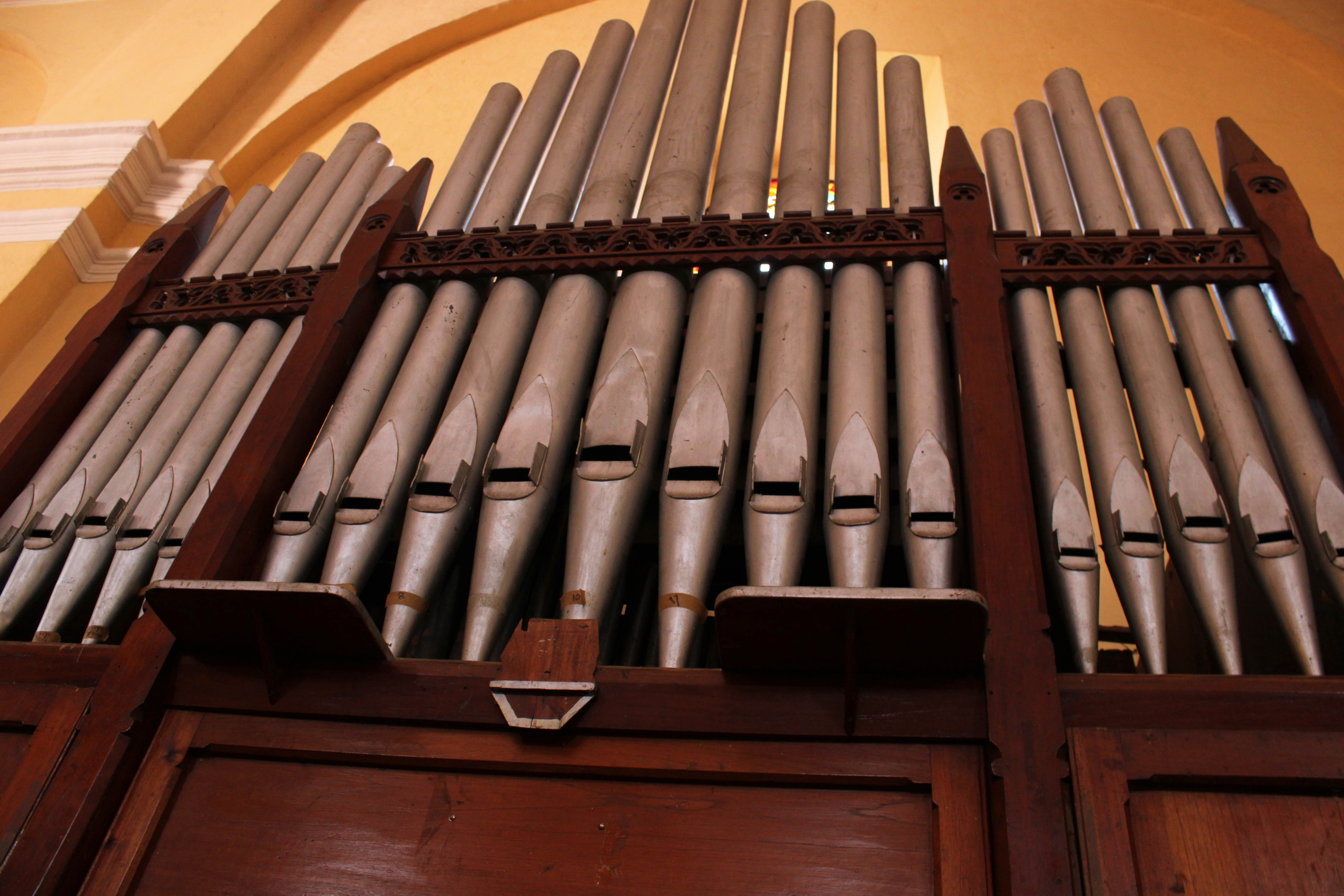
Old Pipe Organ of The Cathedral of Comayagua.

In pre-Hispanic times, the ancient Mayans had their own musical instruments such as aerophones and Yaxchilán-style clay frogs. During the Spanish colonial era, new musical influences, particularly sacred music but also colloquial music, occurred due to the introduction of European instruments, the most widespread being the Spanish guitar and violins. Music during the colonial period was dominated by baroque and religious music which syncretized with local culture, resulting in an evolution into a very regional style.

After the independence of Central America, the cultivation of music continued in Honduras and indigenous traditional music and instruments began to be rescued. In 1936, the Francisco R. Díaz Zelaya National Conservatory of Music was founded. Following the arrival of American cultural influence to the country, due to the banana plantations of UFCO and Standard Fruit Company, new musical genres such as Jazz and Blues began spreading. As the decades passed, English music gradually began to gain more relevance in the country, with Honduran new rock bands born between the 1960s and 1980s.

In 1984, the incorporation of the national music conservatory into the national educational system was approved. Students are trained in various string instruments such as violin, viola, cello, double bass, guitar, piano, wind instruments such as flute, oboe, clarinet, bassoon, horn, saxophone, trumpet, trombone, tuba, and also in instruments percussion with theoretical-practical classes. Among the various national groups and orchestras are the National Symphony Orchestra, the Youth Symphony Orchestra, the Band of the Supreme Powers, and the national marimba "Alma de Honduras."

At an international level, the musical group Banda Blanca began to gain traction with their songs "Sopa de Caracol", "Fiesta", "Saben Quien Arrived", among many others. Although the group produces merengue rhythms, calypso, and other Afro-Antillean rhythms, the band's specialty is the Punta rhythm, which became popular in the 1990s. Honduras has a deep-rooted Rock culture which stems back to American influence during the 1960s with the birth of groups like "Los Robbins". In later years, groups such as Diablos Negros, Delirium, Le Fou, La Pared, Café Guancasco, and Horus joined the movement.

== Cinema ==
The first "true" Honduran cinema began with the filmmaker Sami Kafati, who studied cinematography in Rome in the 1960s. His first cinematographic work was the experimental film Mi Amigo Ángel, produced in 1962 and is the first official film of the cinematography of Honduras. Sami Kafati also directed another national production, No hay Tierra Sin Dueño (1984–1996), a feature-length fiction film.

Currently, the playwrights Hispano Durón Gómez, Mario Jaén, among others, stand out.

Some of the most recent films produced in Honduras are:

- Anita, la cazadora de insectos, produced by Hispano Durón,
- Amor y frijoles by Guacamaya Films in 2009,
- Souls of Midnight (2001) by Juan Carlos Fanconi,
- The Strange Body, by José A. Olay,
- El Reyecito, by Fosi Bendeck,
- Alto riesgo, by René Pauck,
- Angel's Voice, by Francisco Andino,
- Lado, by Esaú Adonai,
- The Last Kidnapping, by José A. Olay, starring Marianela Ibarra, Nelyi Larice, Glen Lopez, Mario Sarmientos
- We Don't Give a damn by Regina Águila.
- A Few with Courage (The Birds of Bethlehem) by Mario Berrios, produced by Ismael Bevilacqua, directed by Douglas Martin (2010)
- Quien paga la cuenta by Guacamaya Films (2013) with the performances of Jorge Flores, Nelyi Larice, Ozcar Izacas, Sandra Ochoa, Maritza Perdomo, Anuar Vindel
- El Xendra by Juan Carlo Fanconi (2012)
- Un lugar en el caribe by Juan Carlo Fanconi (2017)
- La condesa, by Mario Ramos (2021)

Honduran cinema has had a boom in the last decade, the growth of filmmakers and the support given by institutions and private companies to contests has motivated young students of careers related to communications to create their own short films, documentary shorts, and documentaries. The Ícaro Festival is the most important international film festival in Honduras, as well as the whole of Central America and the Caribbean.

After eleven months of discussion and its approval in the National Congress, the Honduran Cinematography Law came into force on 6 December 2019, after being published in the Official Gazette La Gaceta.

== Photography ==
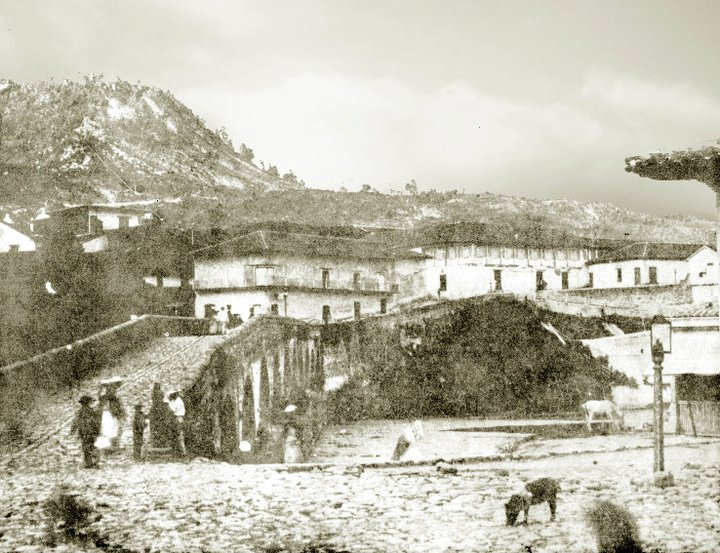
Daguerreotype taken by the Austrian explorer Karl von Scherzer in 1853, this is the oldest photograph still preserved in Honduras.

Photography in Honduras began in the mid-19th century with the arrival of daguerreotypes brought by European explorers and diplomats. There are photographs of Honduras that date back to the 1850s. The first Honduran hero to be photographed was the priest Jose Trinidad Reyes, who had a daguerreotype made posthumously.

The arrival of foreigners to the country after the Liberal Reform led to documentation of the changes in the country over the decades. Many of these foreigners were North Americans who managed to take cameras with them and were able capture photos of the country. These photos inspired Hondurans, resulting in photography slowly gaining popularity and being considered another art form of the country.

One of the first professional photographers in Honduras was Arnold Theodore Williams, who born in Jamaica but migrated to Honduras. Being in Honduras as a resident, he documented the life of the Honduran coast in the 1920s, capturing the lifestyle of the local people as well as historical events such as civil wars. Another one of the most famous photographers of Honduras was Juan Pablo Martell, who documented Honduras and its daily life in the 1960s and 1970s.

=== Gallery ===
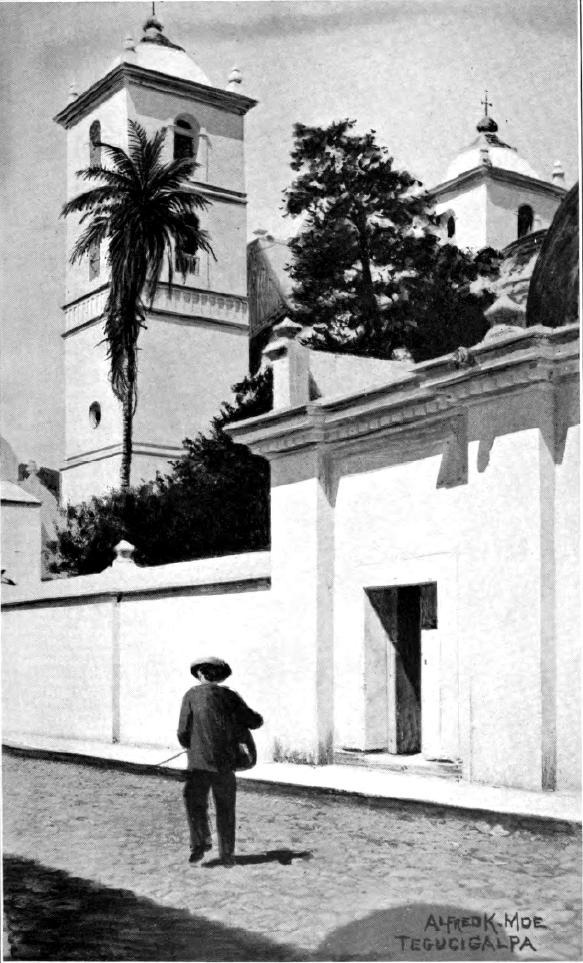
A man walking in Tegucigalpa, 1904, Alfred Keane Moe

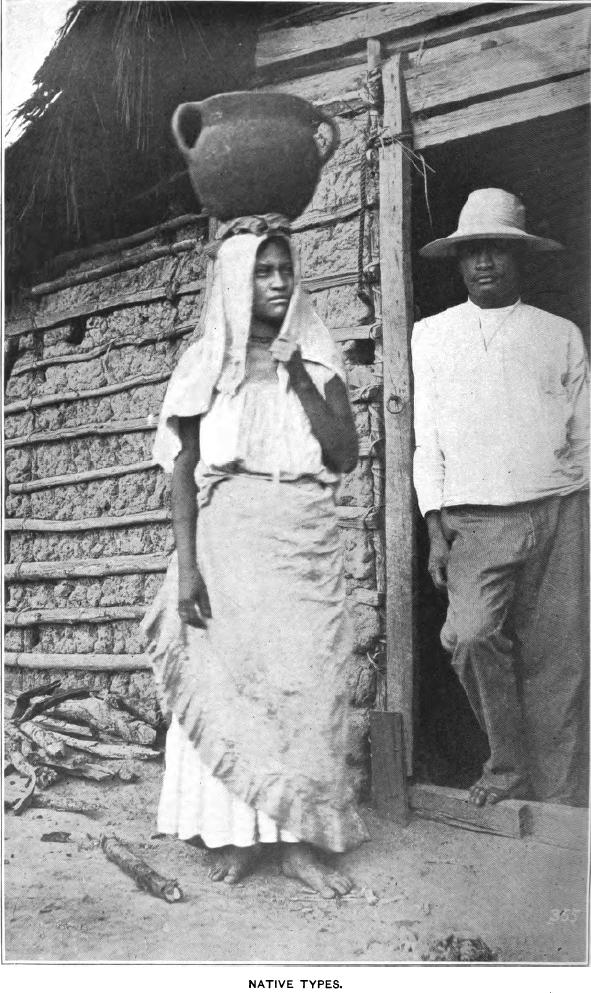
An Indigenous couple, 1904, Alfred Keane Moe

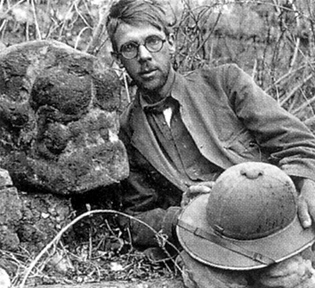
Sylvanus Morley in Copán, 1912, Photographer unknown

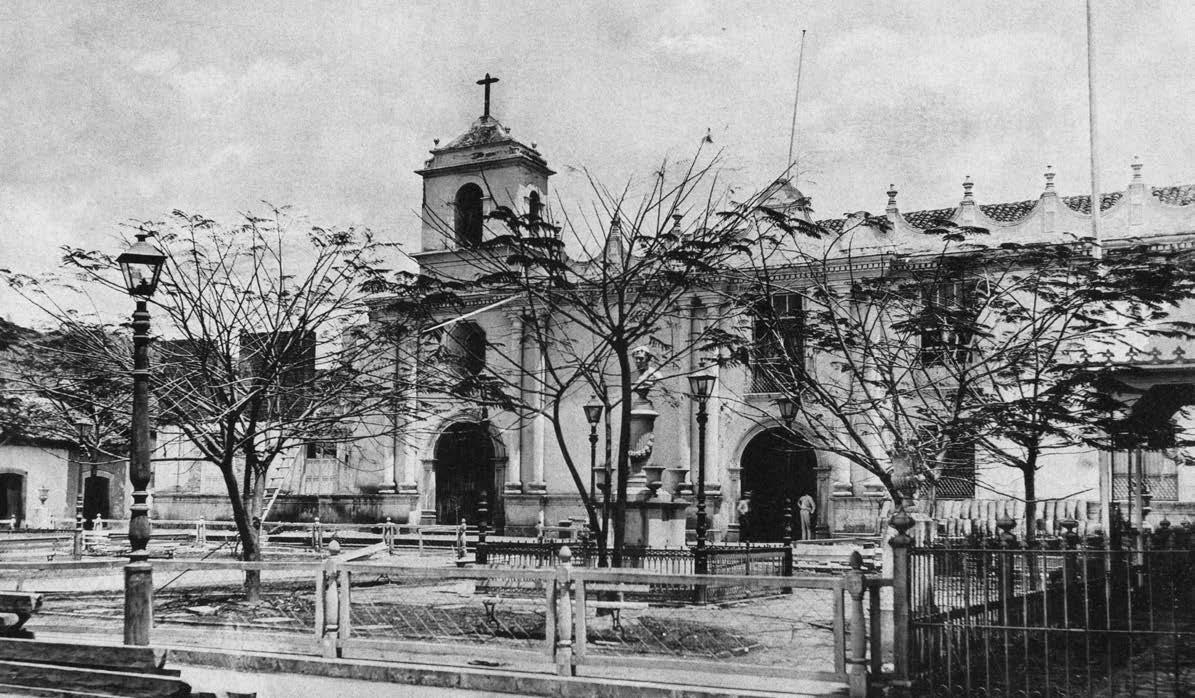
Old UNAH building, 1920s, photographer unknown

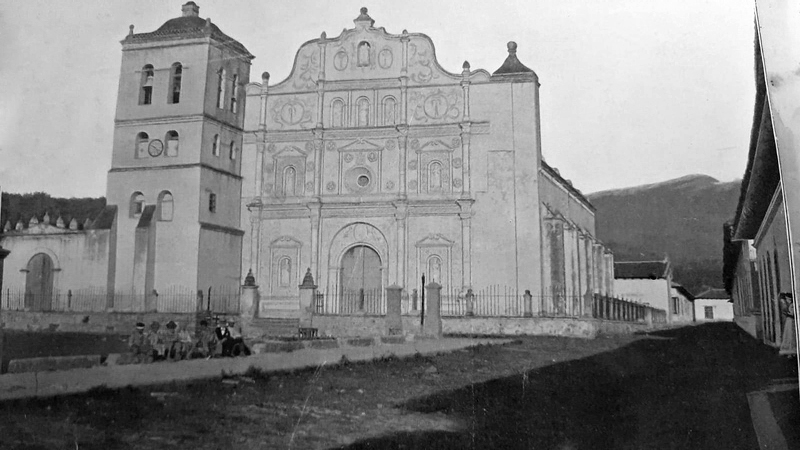
León Alvarado Park, 1910, photographer unknown

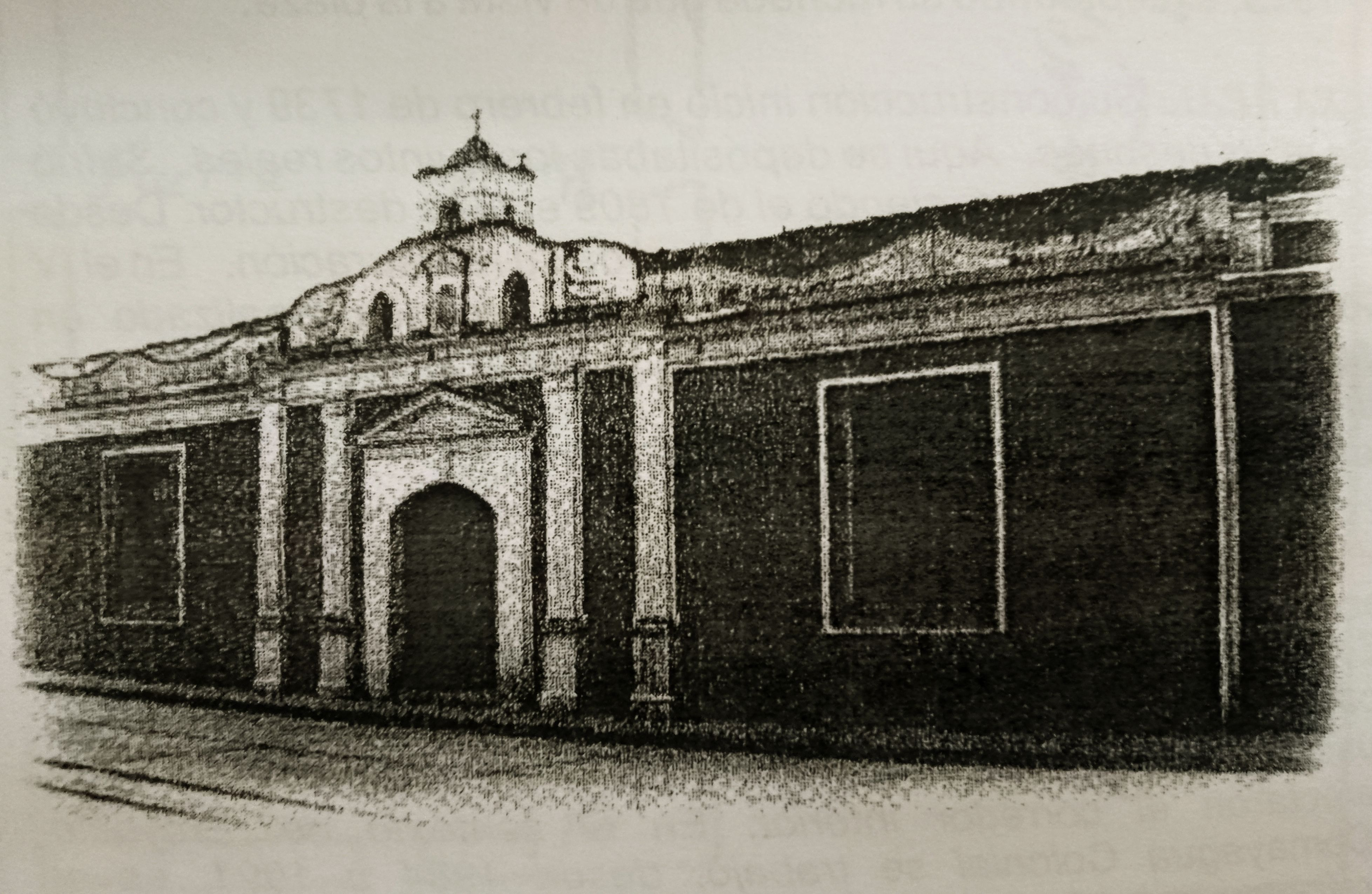
The San Agustin colleague, early 1910s, photographer unknown

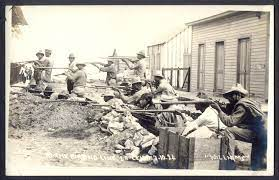
Soldiers during the battle of la Ceiba in second Honduran civil war, 1924, by Arnold Theodore Williams.

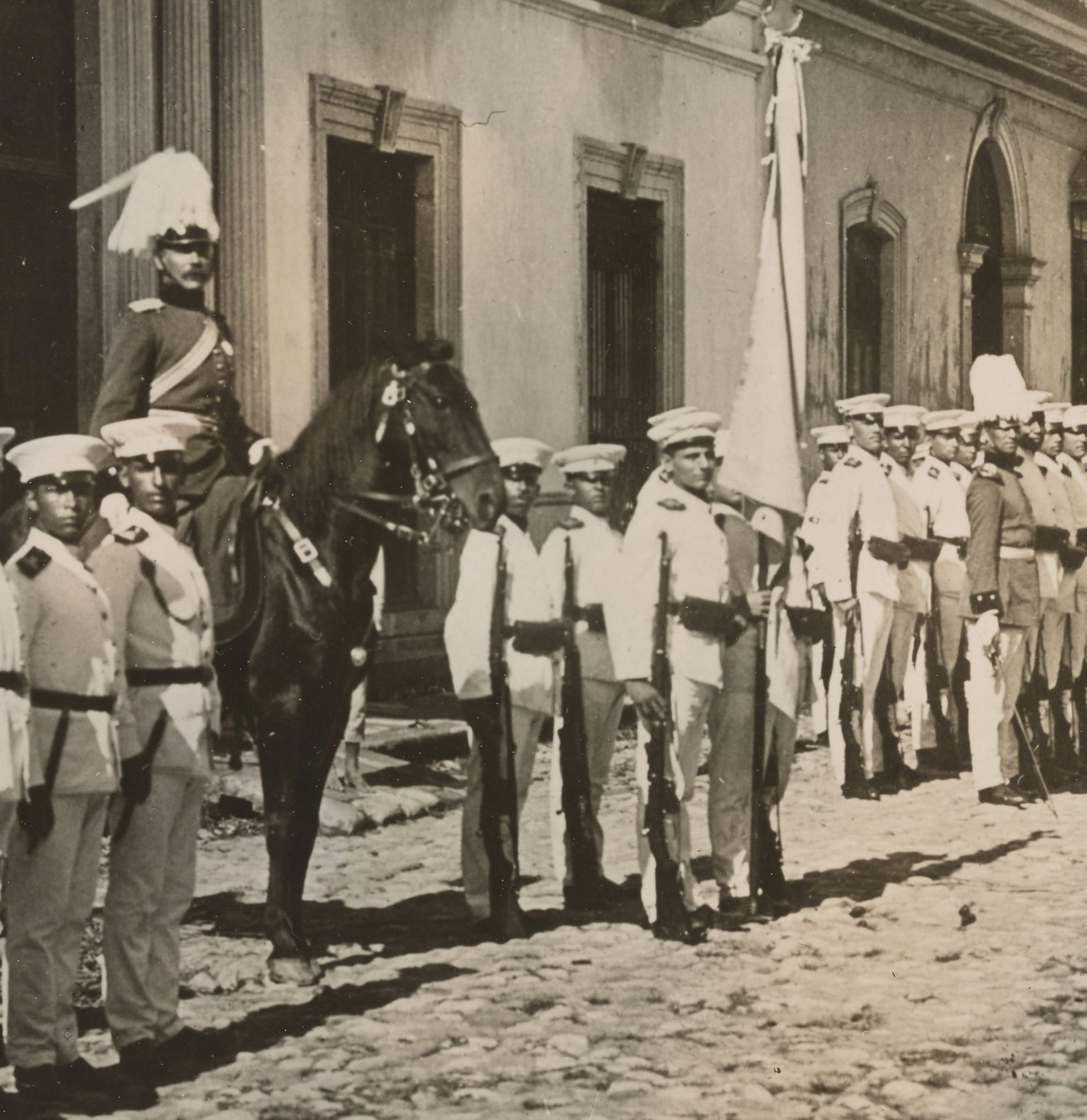
Honduran soldiers, 1927, photographer unknown

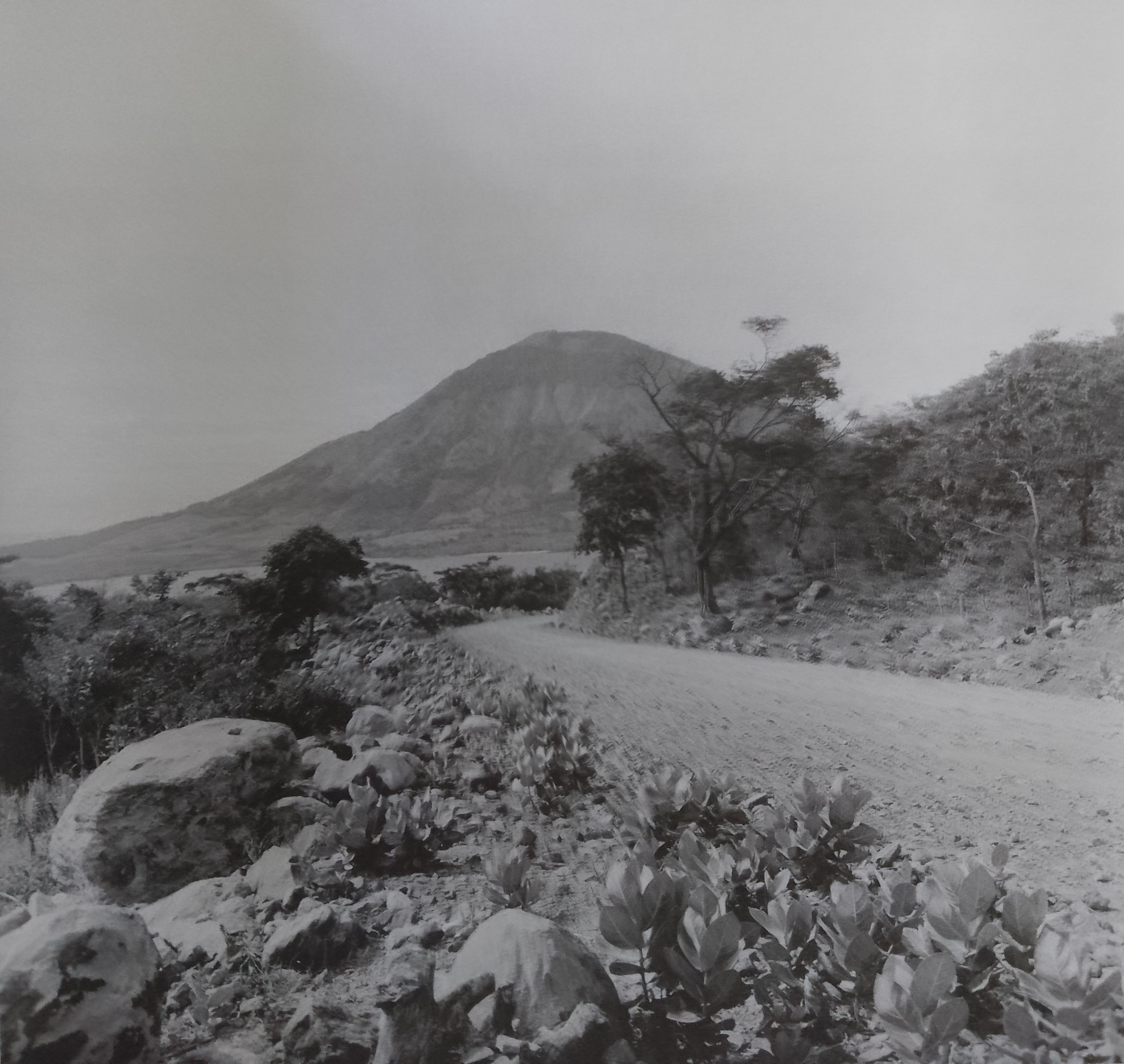
View of Isla del Tigre, 1965, Juan Pablo Martell

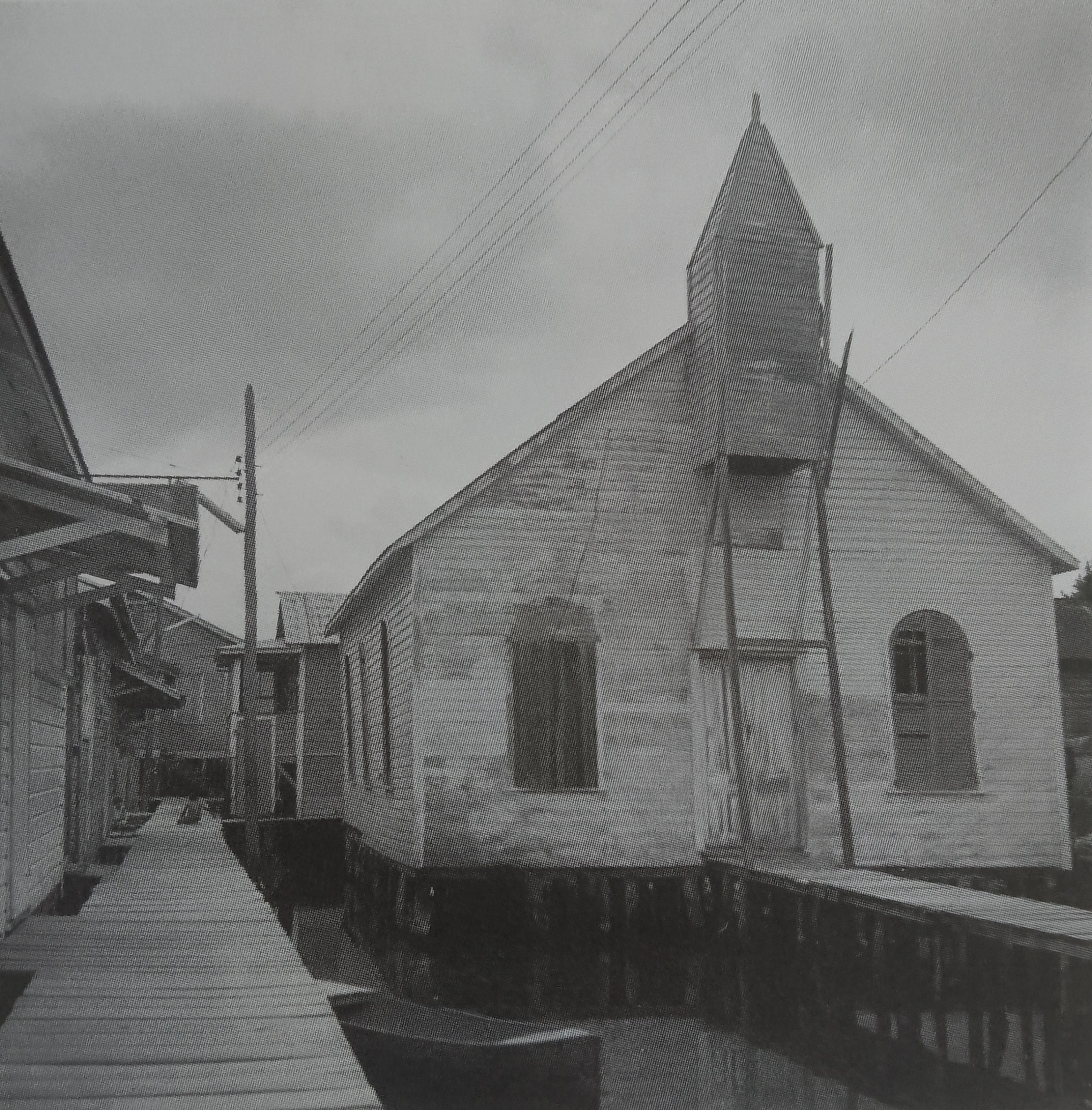
An English church in Roatán, 1960, by Juan Pablo Martell

== Honduran painters ==
Some of the most famous Honduran painters include:

- Santos Arzú
- Patricia Nieto Silva
- Roxana Ventura
- Martha Alegría de Valladares
- Keyla Morel
- Victor Lopez
- Armando Lara
- Jose Miguel Gomez
- Ezequiel Padilla
- Mario Castillo
- Felipe Burchard
- José Antonio Velásquez
- Ricardo Aguilar
- Pablo Zelaya Sierra
- Virgilio Guardiola
- Delmer Mejia
- Lutgardo Molina
- Pablo Zelaya Sierra
- Hidalgo Lara
- Ronal Bejarano

== Honduran Photographers ==
Some of the most well-known Honduran photographers include:

- Juan T. Aguirre
- Carmelo Selano
- Rafael Platero Paz
- Arnold Theodore Williams
- Juan Pablo Martell
- Evaristo Lopez Rojas
- Bobby Handal
- Denis Mayorga
- Luis Alfredo Romero
- Enrique Gamoneda

== See also ==
- History of Honduras
