= 2025 Honduran general election =

- 30 November 2025
- Presidential election
- Turnout: 58.17 (▼10.92pp)
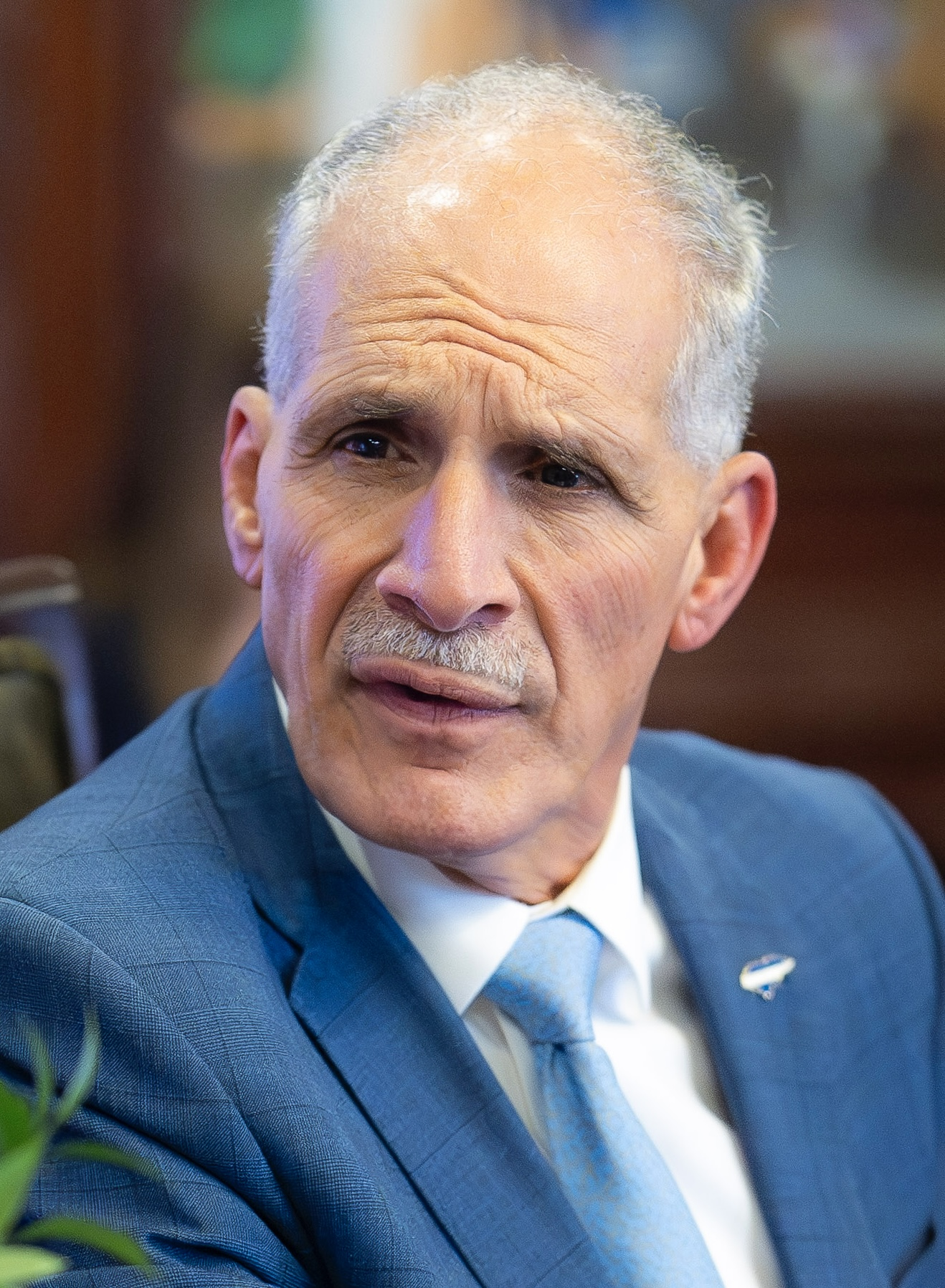

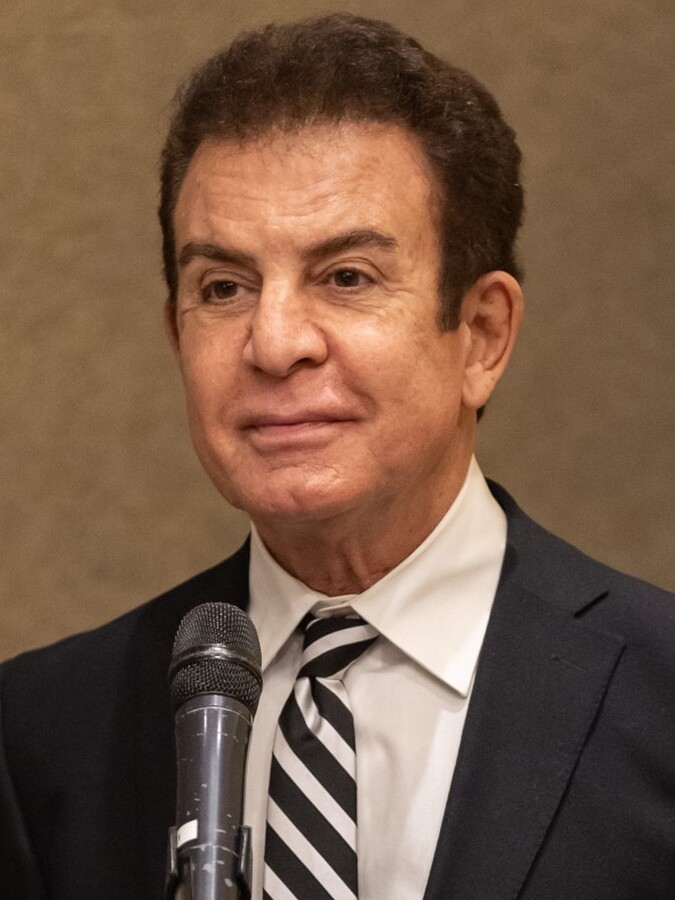

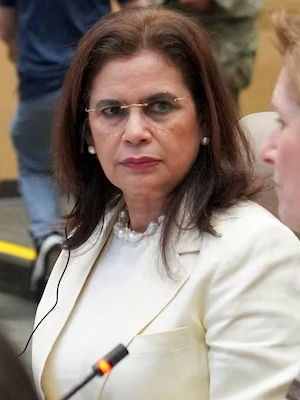
Nominee	Nasry Asfura	Salvador Nasralla	Rixi Moncada
Party	National	Liberal	Libre
Running mate	María Antonieta Mejía; Carlos Flores; Diana Herrera	Jaqueline Raudales; Marco Medina; Vera Rubí	Enrique Reina; Angelica Álvarez; Armando Orellana
Popular vote	1,481,414	1,455,076	706,222
Percentage	40.26%	39.54%	19.19%
- Asfura: Nasralla: Moncada
President before election
Xiomara Castro
Libre
Elected President
Nasry Asfura
National
- Parliamentary election
- All 128 seats in the National Congress; 65 seats needed for a majority
Party	Leader	Vote %	Seats	+/–
National	Nasry Asfura	35.29	49	+5
Liberal	Yani Rosenthal	34.55	41	+19
Libre	Manuel Zelaya	24.29	35	−15
PINU	Doris Gutiérrez	3.14	2	+2
CD	Lucas Evangelisto Aguilera	2.73	1	0
This lists parties that won seats. See the complete results below.
President of the Congress before	President of the Congress after
Luis Redondo; PSH	Tomás Zambrano; National

General elections were held in Honduras on 30 November 2025. Voters elected the President, all 128 members of the National Congress, and 20 representatives to the Central American Parliament (PARLACEN). The National Electoral Council (CNE) declared National Party candidate Nasry Asfura as the election's winner on 24 December. The election was marred by allegations of foreign interference and a prolonged and controversial vote count that saw Asfura win over his nearest opponent, Salvador Nasralla, by a narrow margin. The National Party also won a plurality of seats in the country's National Congress, while the Liberal Party became the second largest party in the Congress at the expense of LIBRE.

== Electoral system ==
The President of Honduras is elected by a simple plurality in a single round of voting; the candidate with the most votes wins, regardless of whether they achieve an absolute majority.

The 128 members of the National Congress are elected by open list proportional representation across 18 multi-member constituencies, which correspond to the country's departments. The number of seats per constituency ranges from one to 23. Seats are allocated using the Hare quota method.

== Primary elections ==
Primary elections to select presidential, congressional, and mayoral candidates for the three major parties—LIBRE, the National Party, and the Liberal Party—were held on 9 March 2025. Eleven smaller parties selected their candidates through internal processes. A total of ten candidates contested the presidential primaries. The voting process was marred by logistical delays in the delivery of electoral materials, leading to late openings at some polling stations and triggering minor protests.

=== Liberal Party primary ===
- Salvador Nasralla, Vice President (2022–2024)
  - Supported by ¡Vamos Honduras! (Let's Go Honduras!)
- Jorge Cálix, congressional deputy
  - Supported by Juntos Por El Cambio (Together for Change)
- Luis Zelaya
  - Supported by Recuperar Honduras (Recover Honduras)
- Maribel Espinoza, congressional deputy
  - Supported by Todos Por Honduras (All For Honduras)

Salvador Nasralla, having unsuccessfully run in 2013 and 2017, decided to join the Liberal party for a third presidential run after conflict with Libre following the 2022 Honduran political crisis and his resignation as First Vice President of Honduras on 30 April 2024.

Candidate	Votes	%
Salvador Nasralla	381,062	58.02
Jorge Cálix	207,968	31.67
Luis Zelaya	34,329	5.23
Maribel Espinoza	33,382	5.08
Total	656,741	100.00

=== LIBRE primary ===
- Rixi Moncada, Secretary of National Defense and former Secretary of Finance (2022–2024)
  - Supported by the Alianza Presidencial Rixi Moncada (Rixi Moncada Presidential Alliance)
- Rasel Tomé, congressional deputy
  - Supported by the Movimiento Renovación Nuevas Alternativas (MORENA) (Renewal Movement New Alternatives)

Candidate	Votes	%
Rixi Moncada	674,215	92.64
Rasel Tomé	53,568	7.36
Total	727,783	100.00

=== National Party primary ===
- Nasry Asfura, former Mayor of the Central District (Tegucigalpa) (2014–2022)
  - Supported by Papi a la Orden! (Daddy at your Service!)
- Ana García Carías, former First Lady of Honduras (2014–2022)
  - Supported by Avanza Por la Justicia y la Unidad (AVANZA) (Advance for Justice and Unity)
- Jorge Alberto Zelaya, congressional deputy
  - Supported by Renovación Unidad Nacionalista (RUN) (Nationalist Unity Renewal)
- Roberto Martínez Lozano
  - Supported by Rescate y Transformación (Rescue and Transformation)

Candidate	Votes	%
Nasry Asfura	625,893	75.84
Ana García Carías	175,900	21.31
Jorge Alberto Zelaya	15,816	1.92
Roberto Martínez Lozano	7,654	0.93
Total	825,263	100.00

== Presidential candidates ==
The race features five main contenders representing a broad political spectrum, from the left-wing populism of LIBRE to the right-wing conservatism of the National Party.

Liberty and Refoundation (LIBRE)	Innovation and Unity Party (PINU-SD)	Liberal Party of Honduras (PLH)	Christian Democratic Party (PDCH)	National Party of Honduras (PNH)
Left	Center-left	Center	Center-right	Right
Rixi Moncada Godoy	Nelson Ávila Gutiérrez	Salvador Nasralla Salum	Mario Rivera Callejas	Nasry Asfura Zablah
Teacher and lawyer	Economist	TV host and civil engineer	Publicist and businessman	Businessman
Previous positions: Minister of Defense (2024–2025); Minister of Finance (2022–2024); Electoral Councilor CNE (2019–2022); Manager of the ENEE (2008–2009); Minister of Labor and Social Security (2006–2008)	Previous positions: Presidential advisor (2006–2009); Presidential pre-candidate M5J-LIBRE (2021 and 2017)	Previous positions: Presidential designate of LIBRE (2022–2024); Presidential candidate of Alliance of the Opposition (2017); Presidential candidate of the PAC (2013)	Previous positions: Owner and host of Q'Hubo TV; Councilman of the Central District for the PNH (2006–2010)	Previous positions: Presidential candidate (2021); Mayor of Tegucigalpa (2014–2022); Deputy (2010–2014). Director FHIS (2010–2011); Councilman of Tegucigalpa (2006–2010). Various positions in Tegucigalpa City Hall (1990–2002)
Ideology: Left-wing populism, Socialism of the 21st century	Ideology: Social democracy, Progressivism, Reformism, Secularism	Ideology: Liberalism	Ideology: Christian democracy, Christian humanism, Conservatism, Pro-U.S.	Ideology: Conservatism, Nationalism, Neoliberalism
for presidential designates	for presidential designates	for presidential designates	for presidential designates	for presidential designates
1. Eduardo Enrique Reina García; 2. Angélica Lizeth Álvarez Morales; 3. José Armando Orellana Romero	1. Iris Elizabeth Vigil Zelaya; 2. Miguel Antonio Aragón Carrasco; 3. Ana Lucía Galdámez Castellanos	1. Jaqueline Raudales Hernández; 2. Marco Tulio Medina Hernández; 3. Vera Sofía Rubí Ávila	1. Gracia María Zelaya Macay; 2. Juan Carlos López Orellana; 3. Olga Lizeth Espinoza Pinoth	1. María Antonieta Mejía Sánchez; 2. Carlos Alberto Flores Guifarro; 3. Diana Baleska Herrera Portillo
Reference: CNE-RESOLUTION 75-2025 OF ACT 32-2025	Reference: CNE-RESOLUTION 71-2025 OF ACT 32-2025	Reference: CNE-RESOLUTION 73-2025 OF ACT 32-2025	Reference: CNE-RESOLUTION 72-2025 OF ACT 32-2025	Reference: CNE-RESOLUTION 74-2025 OF ACT 32-2025

== Parliamentary candidates ==
A total of 632 candidates ran for the 128 seats in the National Congress in the parliamentary elections. Of the 11 parties that were evaluated, only five were approved to run in the elections:

- Innovation and Unity Party
- Christian Democratic Party of Honduras
- Liberal Party of Honduras
- National Party of Honduras
- Liberty and Refoundation

== Campaign ==
The official campaign began on 1 September with opposition parties leading in the polls.

Moncada, who is supported by outgoing president Xiomara Castro, called the election a choice between a "coup-plotting oligarchy", referring to the 2009 Honduran coup d'état, and democratic socialism. She also pledged to protect "natural wealth" from "21st-century filibusters who want to privatise everything" and combat corruption. Asfura pledged to bring "development and opportunities for everyone", to "facilitate foreign and domestic investment into the country", and "generate employment for all". Nasralla, for his part, based his economic plan on four pillars: democracy and the rule of law; food security and rural prosperity; social welfare; and economic welfare.

Nelson Ávila emerged as the candidate offering an alternative to the party system that has governed Honduras and put forward proposals to combat poverty and hunger with measures such as creating a fund to support entrepreneurs, as well as investing in intelligence and police training to reduce violence, a new education system focused on a culture of peace, and Central American international collaboration for common development through a transnational currency and infrastructure.

Rivera, for his part, presented measures such as promoting a referendum to integrate Honduras as a U.S. state, as well as approving the death penalty, moving from a secular state to a non-denominational state, and replicating the libertarian economic measures of Argentine president Javier Milei and the security measures of Salvadoran president Nayib Bukele. On 23 November, Rivera withdrew from the campaign to join Nasralla.

The campaign period was notably violent. A leading independent body monitoring violence in Honduras recorded six politically-motivated homicides, four of which targeted LIBRE candidates. In November, a five-year-old boy was killed when masked gunmen opened fire on a LIBRE campaign event.

=== Allegations of fraud and external interference ===
In late October 2025, audio recordings were released that allegedly featured conversations between members of the opposition – including a National Electoral Council (CNE) representative, Cossette López, Congressman Tomás Zambrano, and a military officer – discussing plans to "manipulate the popular vote". Zambrano, a leader of the National Party, dismissed the recordings as "completely false, fabricated... manipulated [with] artificial intelligence." In response, President Castro called for an official investigation, denouncing what she termed an "electoral coup".

In November, more than 90,000 Hondurans receiving remittances from family abroad were sent phone messages saying that if Moncada won the election, they would not receive their remittances.

Salvador Nasralla claimed U.S. President Donald Trump made statements that potentially influenced the election:

- He endorsed National Party candidate Nasry Asfura, and proposed that U.S. financial aid to Honduras could be 'suspended' if Asfura did not win the election and become President.
- He labelled Liberal party candidate Salvador Nasralla a "borderline communist".
- He pardoned former President Juan Orlando Hernández of the National Party, who until 2 December 2025 was serving a 45-year prison sentence in the United States for drug trafficking.

On 2 December, Cossette López, a member of the CNE from the National Party, accused Marlon Ochoa (a CNE member from LIBRE) of seeking to delay a news conference marking the resumption of the publication of the election results by sending his staff and LIBRE members to the conference venue, which López described as "intimidation". Ochoa had previously filed a complaint against López over her alleged audio recording in October.

On 10 December, the head of the Armed Forces of Honduras, Roosevelt Hernández, said the military would recognize the election results and guarantee that they would be honored. The head of the CNE, Ana Paola Hall, asked for soldiers to be deployed outside buildings where ballots are being stored.

== Reporting of results ==
On 2 December 2025, as preliminary results recorded by a partial digital count showed Nasry Asfura to be in a statistical tie with Salvador Nasralla with Asfura leading by only 515 votes, U.S. president Donald Trump alleged without evidence that the election was fraudulent. The CNE began a manual count that same day. Later that afternoon, Salvador Nasralla had taken a lead of roughly 2,000 votes. Counting was marred by the CNE's official website crashing due to "technical problems" beginning the previous day. The reporting of results was paused, resumed, then paused again the next day. Rixi Moncada also criticized the vote transmission system as flawed and lacking transparency, while calling Trump's comments "a direct intervention that affects the interests of the Honduran people". On 4 December, Asfura regained a narrow lead over Nasralla. Nasralla then alleged the election was fraudulent, and that Trump's last-minute endorsement of rival candidate Asfura cost him votes he otherwise would have obtained.

On 7 December, Rixi Moncada said LIBRE did not recognize the election result, describing the process as an "ongoing electoral coup" and citing interference by Trump and the "allied oligarchy". The CNE stated that approximately 14% of the tally sheets produced inconsistencies and required a review. At a rally on 9 December, president Castro said the process was marked by "threats, coercion, manipulation" of the preliminary results as well as "tampering with the popular will", and criticized Trump's interference in the election. Following LIBRE's refusal to recognize the results, outgoing First Gentleman, LIBRE Party leader, and former President Manuel Zelaya called for street mobilizations in support of Moncada, the ruling party's candidate. During these disruptions, on 15 December, Tomás Zambrano, head of the National Party's parliamentary bloc, accused Zelaya of clinging to power, claiming he "has been the power behind the throne during these four years of the LIBRE government." He denounced what he called a "self-coup" and alleged that Zelaya was calling "his violent armed groups into the streets to prevent the special recount and thus avoid a declaration of victory." Amid the protests, the CNE declared that there were acts that prevented the correct counting of the votes, while the Organization of American States (OAS) said that there was not "any evidence that would cast doubt on the results".

On 16 December, President Castro, citing intelligence sources, declared that her predecessor, Juan Orlando Hernández, was planning his return to Honduras, in what she described as "an attack aimed at breaking the constitutional and democratic order." She called for protests to "defend the popular mandate, reject any coup attempt, and make it clear to the world that a new coup is being planned here." Hernández denied any plans to return to the country.

On 18 December, the CNE began a long-delayed manual recount of about 15% of the votes, which it said had "inconsistencies". On 19 December, the Trump administration imposed sanctions on CNE member Marlon Ochoa and Electoral Justice Tribunal magistrate Mario Morazán, accusing them of "impeding the vote count in Honduras". Both individuals are members of LIBRE.

The CNE declared Asfura as the winner of the presidential election on 24 December. Asfura wrote on social media: "Honduras: I am ready to govern. I will not let you down."

=== President ===
Candidate	Party	Votes	%
Nasry Asfura	National Party	1,481,414	40.26
Salvador Nasralla	Liberal Party	1,455,076	39.55
Rixi Moncada	Liberty and Refoundation	706,222	19.20
Nelson Ávila	Innovation and Unity Party	30,028	0.82
Mario Rivera	Christian Democratic Party	6,450	0.18
Total		3,679,190	100.00
Valid votes		3,679,190	96.97
Invalid votes		71,883	1.89
Blank votes		42,931	1.13
Total votes		3,794,004	100.00
Registered voters/turnout		6,522,577	58.17
Source: CNE

=== National Congress ===
Party	Votes	%	Seats	+/–
National Party	7,138,761	35.29	49	+5
Liberal Party	6,988,261	34.55	41	+19
Liberty and Refoundation	4,912,816	24.29	35	–15
Innovation and Unity Party	634,168	3.14	2	+2
Christian Democratic Party	552,739	2.73	1	0
Total	20,226,745	100.00	128	0
Registered voters/turnout	6,522,577	–		
Source: CNE

=== List of elected Deputies ===
Name	Party	Department
Adolfo Ráquel Pineda	PNH	Francisco Morazán
Adrián Josué Martínez Soler	PNH	Comayagua
Alberto Chedrani Castañeda	PNH	Cortés
Alberto Emilio Cruz Zelaya	PLH	Comayagua
Alejandra Vallecillo Pavón	PLH	Cortés
Alejandro Antonio Canelas Cardona	PLH	Atlántida
Alexander Fabricio Zorto García	PLH	Valle
Alex Remberto Ordóñez Ordóñez	PLH	Choluteca
Alfonso Ordóñez Rodríguez	PLH	Atlántida
Alia Niño Kafati	PLH	Francisco Morazán
Allan Joel Padilla	PLH	La Paz
Ángel David Sandoval Cerrato	Libre	Olancho
Antonio César Rivera Callejas	PNH	Francisco Morazán
Ariana Melissa Banegas Cárcamo	PNH	Colón
Arnold Daniel Burgos Borjas	PNH	Francisco Morazán
Bayron Eduardo Banegas Mejía	Libre	La Paz
Carlos Alberto Meza Mejía	PNH	Comayagua
Carlos Alberto Umaña David	PLH	Cortés
Carlos Eduardo Cano Martínez	PNH	Olancho
Carlos Roberto Ledezma Casco	PNH	Choluteca
Cinthya Dayanara Hawit Flores	PNH	Cortés
Clara Marisabel López Pérez	Libre	Francisco Morazán
Daisy María Andonie López	PNH	Cortés
Dany Leonel Murillo Díaz	Libre	Lempira
David Sanín Manaiza Ramírez	PNH	Atlántida
Diler Mauricio Martínez Hernández	PNH	Choluteca
Dunia Yadira Jiménez Aguilar	Libre	Cortés
Eder Leonel Mejía Laínez	PNH	Yoro
Edgardo Antonio Casaña Mejía	Libre	Santa Bárbara
Edgardo Rashid Mejía Giannini	PLH	Francisco Morazán
Eduardo José Elvir Ferrufino	Libre	Copán
Enrique Alejandro Matute Díaz	Libre	Atlántida
Erik José Alvarado Alvarado	PNH	Copán
Erika Corina Urtecho Echeverría	PLH	Gracias a Dios
Ever Nazael Aguilar Aguilar	Libre	El Paraíso
Fani Noemí Santos Portillo	PLH	Ocotepeque
Felipe Tomás Ponce Isaula	Libre	Yoro
Fernando Enrique Castro Valle	PLH	Cortés
Francis Omar Cabrera Miranda	PLH	Copán
Gerlen Amanda Bonilla López	PLH	Yoro
Germán Oswaldo Altamirano Díaz	Libre	Santa Bárbara
Gloria Yasmin Meza Erazo	PLH	Cortés
Godofredo Fajardo Ramírez	DC	Francisco Morazán
Gustavo Adolfo González Aguilar	PNH	El Paraíso
Gustavo Enrique González Maldonado	Libre	Francisco Morazán
Hugo Rolando Noé Pino	Libre	Francisco Morazán
Ileana Nazareth Velásquez Ordóñez	PNH	Choluteca
Iroska Lindaly Elvir Flores de Nasralla	PLH	Francisco Morazán
Isis Carolina Cuéllar Erazo	Libre	Copán
Javier Adolfo Miralda Villalobos	Libre	Comayagua
Javier Alejandro Mendieta Servellón	PNH	Choluteca
Jeniffer Alexandra Díaz Ponce	Libre	Yoro
Jhosy Saddam Toscano Ramírez	PLH	Francisco Morazán
Johana Guicel Bermúdez Lacayo	PNH	Francisco Morazán
John Milton García Flores	Libre	El Paraíso
José Cárlenton Dávila Mondragón	PINU-SD	Francisco Morazán
José Domingo Henríquez Machado	PLH	Atlántida
José Jaar Mudenat	PNH	Cortés
José Rolando Sabillón Muñoz	PLH	Santa Bárbara
José Salomón Nazar Ordóñez	PLH	Francisco Morazán
José Tomás Zambrano Molina	PNH	Valle
Josué Fabricio Carbajal Sandoval	Libre	Valle
Juan Alberto Sauceda Cardona	PNH	Colón
Juan Carlos Lagos Fuentes	PNH	Copán
Juan Carlos Vargas Ríos	PNH	Comayagua
Juan José Zerón González	PNH	La Paz
Karla Patricia Figueroa Cardoza	PNH	Olancho
Kilvett Zabdiel Jossua Bertrand Barrientos	PNH	Francisco Morazán
Kritza Jerlin Pérez Gallegos	Libre	Francisco Morazán
Leiby Melissa Torres Zalavarría	PLH	Cortés
Lenin David Valeriano Menjívar	PNH	Lempira
Leonel López Orellana	PLH	Yoro
Lesly Carolina Flores Méndez	PNH	Valle
Linda Frances Donaire Portillo	Libre	Cortés
Lissi Marcela Matute Cano	PNH	Francisco Morazán
Lucy Michell Guerrero Paz	Libre	Francisco Morazán
Luis Enrique Ortega Sánchez	Libre	Choluteca
Luis Fernando Coello	PLH	Choluteca
Luz Angélica Smith Mejía	Libre	Santa Bárbara
Luz Ernestina Mejía Portillo	PLH	Francisco Morazán
Marco Antonio Midence Milla	PNH	Atlántida
Marco Aurelio Maradiaga Molina	Libre	Colón
Marco Aurelio Tinoco Urbina	PLH	Yoro
Marco Tulio Rodríguez Gavarrete	PLH	Lempira
Marcos Bertilio Paz Sabillón	PNH	Santa Bárbara
Marcos Ramiro Lobo Rosales	Libre	Olancho
María Fernanda Sandres Umanzor	PNH	Santa Bárbara
María José Sosa Rosales	PNH	Francisco Morazán
Mario Alonso Pérez López	PNH	Santa Bárbara
Mario Amílcar Portillo Contreras	Libre	Intibucá
Mario Edgardo Segura Aroca	PLH	El Paraíso
Mario Orlando Reyes Mejía	PNH	Santa Bárbara
Marlon Guillermo Lara Orellana	PLH	Cortés
Máxima Alejandra Burgos Hernández	PNH	Yoro
Melbi Concepción Ortiz Murillo	Libre	Yoro
Milton Jesús Puerto Oseguera	PNH	Yoro
Nidia Gissela Castillo Funez	Libre	Choluteca
Óscar Ariel Montoya Rodezno	Libre	Atlántida
Óscar Eduardo Rivera Henríquez	PNH	Olancho
Oswaldo José Ramos Aguilar	PNH	Francisco Morazán
Pedro Mendoza Flores	PLH	El Paraíso
Rafael Leonardo Sarmiento Aguiriano	Libre	Olancho
Remberto Alexander Zavala Rozales	PNH	Atlántida
Rita María Zúñiga Membreño	Libre	Cortés
Roberto Enrique Cosenza Hernández	PNH	Cortés
Roberto Pineda Chacón	PLH	Cortés
Rolando Contreras Mendoza	PINU-SD	Cortés
Rolando Enrique Barahona Puerto	PLH	Comayagua
Ronald Edgardo Panchamé Urquía	Libre	Comayagua
Roy Dagoberto Cruz Pérez	PNH	Copán
Rumy Nahyp Bueso Meza	PLH	Intibucá
Samuel Armando de Jesús García Salgado	PLH	Olancho
Sandra Carolina Coleman Milián	PLH	Cortés
Sara Elizabeth Estrada Zavala	PNH	Francisco Morazán
Saraí Pamela Espinal López	PLH	Francisco Morazán
Scherly Melissa Arriaga Gómez	Libre	Cortés
Selvin Octavio Morales Bonilla	Libre	Lempira
Sergio Arturo Castellanos Perdomo	Libre	Santa Bárbara
Stephen Garrett García Arch	PNH	Islas de la Bahía
Tania Gabriela Pinto Pacheco	PNH	Ocotepeque
Thirsa Gabriela López Solís	PLH	Cortés
Tibdeo Ricardo Elencoff Martínez	PLH	Colón
Valeska Yamileth Valenzuela Chávez	PLH	Copán
Víctor Napoleón Amador Morales	PNH	Intibucá
Walter Antonio Chávez Hernández	PNH	El Paraíso
Wenceslao Lara Orellana	PLH	Cortés
Wilson Rolando Pineda Díaz	PNH	Lempira
Yury Cristhian Sabas Gutiérrez	PLH	Choluteca
Source: Tribunal Superior de Cuentas - TSC

=== PARLACEN ===
Party	Seats
Liberal Party	8
National Party	8
Liberty and Refoundation	4
Total	20
Source: CNE

=== Observers ===
More than 4,000 local and international election observers monitored the election. Eladio Loizaga, the head of the Organization of American States observer mission, said there was no evidence "that would cast doubt on the results", but acknowledged a lack of expertise among vote organizers. A European Union observer mission also reported that it had "not observed any serious irregularities that could affect the current preliminary results".

== Reactions and aftermath ==
The defeated candidate, Salvador Nasralla, rejected the election results, arguing that "a result should not have been declared without counting all the votes." Nasralla also made a public appeal to US President Donald Trump, who had publicly supported Asfura, urging him to pressure the president-elect to allow a recount of the votes, ballot by ballot. Meanwhile, outgoing president Xiomara Castro announced that she accepted the results and would leave office on the scheduled date.

Israel congratulated Asfura on his victory, agreed to work to strengthen bilateral relations, and invited him to visit the country. After his victory was declared, Asfura visited the residence of the Israeli ambassador to Honduras, an action described as "unprecedented in the country".

María Antonieta Mejía, one of Asfura's elected vice presidents, reported on 26 December that Asfura will assume the presidency on 27 January in a ceremony in National Congress, unlike the traditional inauguration at the National Stadium, stating that he wants a "symbolic and unostentatious" event to refrain from an event "that will have a large budget".

On 10 January 2026, the Congress approved by majority vote a recount of the votes cast in the November 2025 general election, which was subsequently approved by a President Xiomara Castro's decree.

Nasry Asfura was sworn in as President on 27 January 2026.
