= 2021 Honduran general election =

- 28 November 2021
- Registered: 5,182,425
- Presidential election
- Turnout: 69.09% (▲11.60pp)
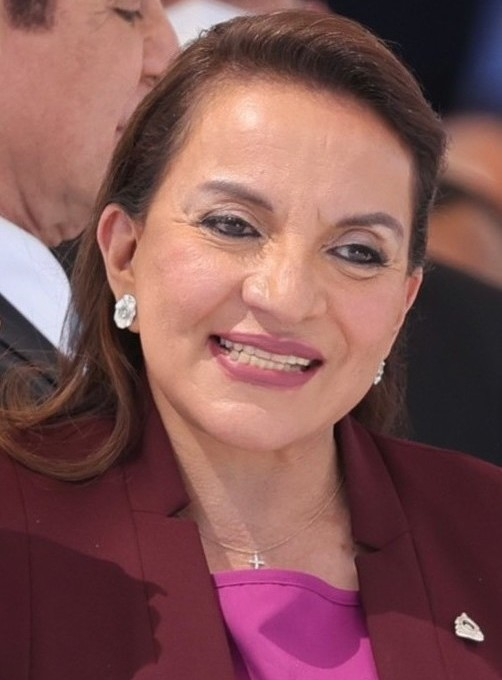

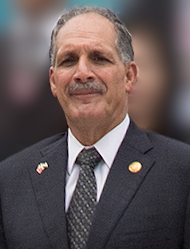

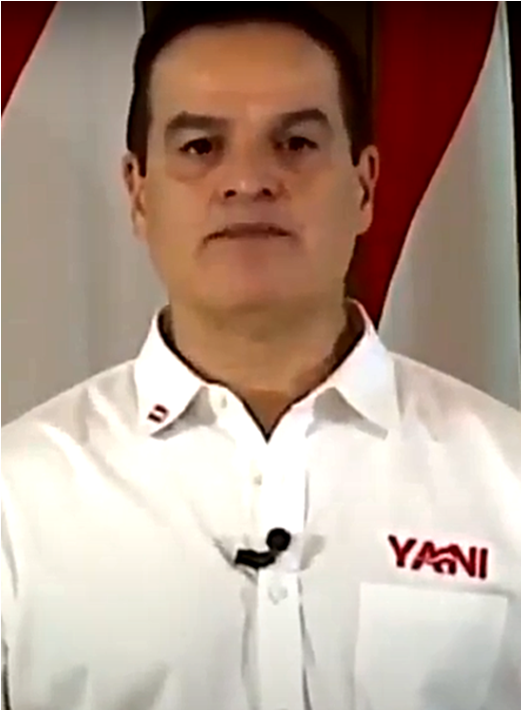
Nominee	Xiomara Castro	Nasry Asfura	Yani Rosenthal
Party	Libre	National	Liberal
Running mate	Salvador Nasralla	Mireya Agüero	Yadira Bendaña
Popular vote	1,716,793	1,240,260	335,762
Percentage	51.12%	36.93%	10.00%
- Castro: <40% 40-50% 50–60% 60–70% 70–80% Asfura: <40% 40–50% 50–60% 60–70% Rosenthal: <40%
President before election
Juan Orlando Hernández
National
Elected President
Xiomara Castro
Libre
- Parliamentary election
- All 128 seats in the National Congress; 65 seats needed for a majority
Party	Leader	Vote %	Seats	+/–
Libre	Manuel Zelaya	40.22	50	+20
National	David Chávez	30.17	44	−17
PSH	Salvador Nasralla	12.72	10	New
Liberal	Yani Rosenthal	11.13	22	−4
CD	Marco Antonio Reyes	0.96	1	0
PAC	Marlene Alvarenga	0.86	1	0
This lists parties that won seats. See the complete results below.
Results of the congressional election
President of the Congress before	President of the Congress after
Mauricio Oliva; National	Luis Redondo; PSH

General elections were held in Honduras on 28 November 2021. Among the positions being contested was the President of Honduras, head of state and head of government of Honduras, to replace Juan Orlando Hernández from the National Party. Also up for election were the 128 deputies of the National Congress, 20 deputies to the Central American Parliament, 298 mayors and 298 vice mayors, as well as 2,092 council members.

Following the election, Nasry Asfura of the National Party and Xiomara Castro of Libre both declared victory as votes were being counted. On 30 November 2021, Asfura and the National Party conceded to Castro. Castro's win made her the first female president-elect of Honduras, the person with the most votes obtained in the history of Honduras, and ended 12 years of conservative National Party rule. She also became the first President elected from a party other than the National Party, Liberal Party, or their predecessors.

== Background ==
Incumbent president Juan Orlando Hernández was first elected in 2013 after defeating Xiomara Castro, and re-elected in 2017 after orchestrating an amendment to Constitution of Honduras to allow for his reelection. There were large protests against Hernandez following the 2017 elections, which the OAS stated contained numerous irregularities.

== Electoral system ==
The President of Honduras is elected by plurality, with the candidate receiving the most votes in a single round of voting declared the winner.

The 128 members of the National Congress are elected by open list proportional representation from 18 multi-member constituencies based on the departments ranging in size from one to 23 seats. Seats are allocated using the Hare quota. Each voter can cast as many votes as the number of seats to be filled in the district. Votes are cast for individual candidates.

== Primary elections ==
Party primaries were held on 14 March 2021 to elect which candidates would represent each party.

Movements	Candidates	Votes	Total	Map
National Party (PNH)
Unity and Hope	Nasry Asfura	681,701 (70.12%)	Valid votes: 972,139; Invalid votes: 86,369; Blank Votes: 108,791; Total: 1,167,299 (46.53%)	Nasry Asfura 80%-90% Nasry Asfura 70%-80% Nasry Asfura 60%-70% Nasry Asfura 50%-60% Mauricio Oliva 50%-60%
Together We Can	Mauricio Oliva	290,438 (29.88%)	Valid votes: 972,139; Invalid votes: 86,369; Blank Votes: 108,791; Total: 1,167,299 (46.53%)	Nasry Asfura 80%-90% Nasry Asfura 70%-80% Nasry Asfura 60%-70% Nasry Asfura 50%-60% Mauricio Oliva 50%-60%
Liberal Party (PLH)
Yanista Movement	Yani Rosenthal	339,001 (49.97%)	Valid votes: 678,370; Invalid votes: 41,460; Blank Votes: 58,867; Total: 778,697 (31.04%)	Yani Rosenthal 70%-80% Yani Rosenthal 60%-70% Yani Rosenthal 50%-60% Yani Rosenthal 40%-50% Luis Zelaya 60%-70% Luis Zelaya 50%-60% Luis Zelaya 30%-40% Dario Banegas 30%-40%
Recover Honduras	Luis Zelaya	230,242 (33.94%)	Valid votes: 678,370; Invalid votes: 41,460; Blank Votes: 58,867; Total: 778,697 (31.04%)	Yani Rosenthal 70%-80% Yani Rosenthal 60%-70% Yani Rosenthal 50%-60% Yani Rosenthal 40%-50% Luis Zelaya 60%-70% Luis Zelaya 50%-60% Luis Zelaya 30%-40% Dario Banegas 30%-40%
The Hope of Honduras	Darío Banegas	109,127 (16.09%)	Valid votes: 678,370; Invalid votes: 41,460; Blank Votes: 58,867; Total: 778,697 (31.04%)	Yani Rosenthal 70%-80% Yani Rosenthal 60%-70% Yani Rosenthal 50%-60% Yani Rosenthal 40%-50% Luis Zelaya 60%-70% Luis Zelaya 50%-60% Luis Zelaya 30%-40% Dario Banegas 30%-40%
Liberty and Refoundation (Libre)
Somos+	Xiomara Castro	404,238 (79.08%)	Valid votes: 511,201; Invalid votes: 26,123; Blank Votes: 25,106; Total: 562,430 (22.43%)	Xiomara Castro >90% Xiomara Castro 80%-90% Xiomara Castro 70%-80% Xiomara Castro 60%-70%
M-28 Power for You	Xiomara Castro	404,238 (79.08%)	Valid votes: 511,201; Invalid votes: 26,123; Blank Votes: 25,106; Total: 562,430 (22.43%)	Xiomara Castro >90% Xiomara Castro 80%-90% Xiomara Castro 70%-80% Xiomara Castro 60%-70%
Popular Refoundation Force FRP	Xiomara Castro	404,238 (79.08%)	Valid votes: 511,201; Invalid votes: 26,123; Blank Votes: 25,106; Total: 562,430 (22.43%)	Xiomara Castro >90% Xiomara Castro 80%-90% Xiomara Castro 70%-80% Xiomara Castro 60%-70%
People Organized in Resistance POR	Xiomara Castro	404,238 (79.08%)	Valid votes: 511,201; Invalid votes: 26,123; Blank Votes: 25,106; Total: 562,430 (22.43%)	Xiomara Castro >90% Xiomara Castro 80%-90% Xiomara Castro 70%-80% Xiomara Castro 60%-70%
Free People	Xiomara Castro	404,238 (79.08%)	Valid votes: 511,201; Invalid votes: 26,123; Blank Votes: 25,106; Total: 562,430 (22.43%)	Xiomara Castro >90% Xiomara Castro 80%-90% Xiomara Castro 70%-80% Xiomara Castro 60%-70%
AAAMEL	Xiomara Castro	404,238 (79.08%)	Valid votes: 511,201; Invalid votes: 26,123; Blank Votes: 25,106; Total: 562,430 (22.43%)	Xiomara Castro >90% Xiomara Castro 80%-90% Xiomara Castro 70%-80% Xiomara Castro 60%-70%
5 July Movement	Nelson Ávila	58,995 (11.54%)	Valid votes: 511,201; Invalid votes: 26,123; Blank Votes: 25,106; Total: 562,430 (22.43%)	Xiomara Castro >90% Xiomara Castro 80%-90% Xiomara Castro 70%-80% Xiomara Castro 60%-70%
Nueva Corriente	Carlos Eduardo Reina	25,368 (4.96%)	Valid votes: 511,201; Invalid votes: 26,123; Blank Votes: 25,106; Total: 562,430 (22.43%)	Xiomara Castro >90% Xiomara Castro 80%-90% Xiomara Castro 70%-80% Xiomara Castro 60%-70%
Free Honduras	Wilfredo Méndez	22,600 (4.42%)	Valid votes: 511,201; Invalid votes: 26,123; Blank Votes: 25,106; Total: 562,430 (22.43%)	Xiomara Castro >90% Xiomara Castro 80%-90% Xiomara Castro 70%-80% Xiomara Castro 60%-70%
Total			2,508,426 (100.00%)	
Source: National Electoral Council

== Candidates ==
=== Nasry Asfura ===
Nasry Asfura is the current mayor of Honduras's capital, Tegucigalpa, and a member of the ruling right-wing National Party of Honduras. During the campaign, Asfura distanced himself from former President Juan Orlando Hernandez's alleged involvement within drug trafficking schemes engaged by his brother. Asfura is known by his supporters as "Papi a la orden" or "Daddy at your service."

Asfura prioritized upgrades to infrastructure and job creation. In addition, Asfura pledged support towards the business, health, education, and manufacturing sectors.

=== Xiomara Castro ===
Xiomara Castro, the First Lady of Honduras from 2006 to 2009, was the presidential candidate for the left-wing Liberty and Refoundation (Libre) party in the 2013 general election, finishing in second place. She founded the party with her husband Manuel Zelaya after he was deposed in the 2009 Honduran coup d'état.

Her thirty-point campaign platform includes a referendum on a new constitution, the establishment of diplomatic relations with the People's Republic of China, the creation of a UN-backed anti-corruption commission modeled on the International Commission against Impunity in Guatemala (CICIG) and advancing women's rights. On economic issues, she opposes the ZEDES semi-autonomous free trade zones promoted by Juan Orlando Hernández and supports social programs to fight poverty while maintaining good relations with the private sector. She also proposes the reform of the Security, Defense, Coalition, and Secrecy Laws.

=== Yani Rosenthal ===
Yani Rosenthal is a longtime member of the centrist Liberal Party of Honduras. He is a businessman and was sentenced to three years in a US prison for laundering drug money, being released in 2020 just in time to begin his presidential campaign.

=== Withdrawn candidates ===
- Milton Benítez, independent candidate who withdrew to support Xiomara Castro
- Salvador Nasralla, a candidate in 2013 and 2017, was planning to run as the candidate of the Savior Party of Honduras, but withdrew from the election on 13 October to become Castro's running mate.
- Santos Rodriguez Orellana, independent candidate who was arrested under drug trafficking and homicide charges.

== Opinion polls ==
Pollster	Date	Sample size	Nasry Asfura	Xiomara Castro	Salvador Nasralla	Yani Rosenthal	Other	Undecided/ abstention
2021 election	28 November 2021	—	36.4	50.6	—	10.0	3.0	—
LeVote	Exit-Poll	—	35.1	50.5	—	12.0	2.4	—
TResearch	22–25 November 2021	1,000	28.2	42.9	—	4.0	2.9	22.1
Paradigma	14–26 October 2021	3,463	27.7	25.7	—	6.6	2	38
CESPAD	14–20 October 2021	1,726	21	38	—	3	5	33
Nasralla withdrew on 13 October 2021
Paradigma	30 September 2021	3,355	22.7	18.7	10.1	5.5	2.7	40.3
CID-Gallup	10 September 2021	1,288	21	18	18	13	2	28
TResearch	8–9 September 2021	1,000	30.9	31.8	15.8	9.3	2.2	9.9
Paradigma	11–26 August 2021	4,446	15.0	13.8	7.5	4.8	0.6	58.5
Paradigma	28 June–13 July 2021	3,003	12.4	12.9	7.1	6.1	1.3	60.2
CESPAD	13 April–7 May 2021	1,888	14.9	11.7	7.9	6.6	7.6	51.1
Primary elections held on 14 March 2021
C&E Research	2 March 2021	600	14.2	13.8	15.5	14.1	—	42.4

== Results ==
Both Asfura and Castro declared victory on election night as votes continued to be counted. On 30 November 2021, Asfura's National Party conceded defeat to Castro. Asfura announced in a statement that he met with Castro and her family to congratulate her win.

Castro's victory marked the end of 12 years of National Party control of the presidency, following the constitutional crisis and the subsequent coup d'état that ousted Castro's husband in 2009. Castro is the first female president of Honduras.

=== President ===
Candidate	Party	Votes	%
Xiomara Castro	Liberty and Refoundation	1,716,793	51.12
Nasry Asfura	National Party	1,240,260	36.93
Yani Rosenthal	Liberal Party	335,762	10.00
Milton Benítez	Humane Honduras	8,857	0.26
Carlos Mauricio Portillo	Christian Democratic Party	7,103	0.21
Romeo Vásquez Velásquez	Honduran Patriotic Alliance	6,556	0.20
Kelin Pérez Gómez	Broad Front	6,053	0.18
Esdras Amado López	New Route Party	5,911	0.18
Alexander Mira	Savior Party of Honduras–PINU-SD	5,711	0.17
Marlon Escoto	We are all Honduras	5,382	0.16
Alfonso Díaz Narváez	Democratic Unification Party	5,081	0.15
Julio Lopéz Casaca	Anti-Corruption Party	4,181	0.12
José Coto García	Go-Solidary Movement	3,768	0.11
Lempira Cuauhtemoc Viana	Democratic Liberation Party	3,361	0.10
Santos Orlando Rodriguez Orellana	Independent Movement Dignity and Hope	3,274	0.10
Total		3,358,053	100.00
Valid votes		3,358,053	93.79
Invalid votes		142,495	3.98
Blank votes		79,979	2.23
Total votes		3,580,527	100.00
Registered voters/turnout		5,182,425	69.09
Source: CNE

=== National Congress ===
Party	Votes	%	Seats	+/–
Liberty and Refoundation	12,758,080	40.22	50	+20
National Party	9,572,363	30.17	44	–17
Savior Party of Honduras	4,035,970	12.72	10	New
Liberal Party	3,531,884	11.13	22	–5
Innovation and Unity Party	335,236	1.06	0	–4
Christian Democratic Party	305,358	0.96	1	0
Anti-Corruption Party	272,671	0.86	1	0
Honduran Patriotic Alliance	224,940	0.71	0	–4
Democratic Unification Party	154,601	0.49	0	–1
Go-Solidary Movement	147,911	0.47	0	New
New Route Party	114,889	0.36	0	New
We are all Honduras	111,822	0.35	0	0
Democratic Liberation Party	90,209	0.28	0	New
Broad Front	67,736	0.21	0	0
Total	31,723,670	100.00	128	0
Registered voters/turnout	5,167,105	–		
Source: CNE

=== PARLACEN ===
Party	Seats
Liberty and Refoundation	10
National Party	8
Liberal Party	2
Total	20
Source: CNE

=== Municipalities ===
Party	Votes	%	Seats		
Party	Votes	%	Councillors	Municipalities	+/–
National Party	1,101,599	32.96	946	143	–31
Liberty and Refoundation	966,869	28.93	456	50	+19
Liberal Party	872,558	26.11	615	91	+2
Democratic Unification–National alliance	157,842	4.72	4	0	–
Savior Party of Honduras	53,480	1.60	11	1	New
Liberal–Libre alliance	43,840	1.31	42	7	–
Christian Democratic Party	129,138	3.86	17	3	+2
Honduran Patriotic Alliance	129,138	3.86	10	1	–
Innovation and Unity Party	129,138	3.86	8	1	+1
We are all Honduras	129,138	3.86	8	1	New
Anti-Corruption Party	129,138	3.86	3	0	–1
Go-Solidary Movement	129,138	3.86	5	0	–1
Democratic Unification Party	129,138	3.86	3	0	–
New Route Party	129,138	3.86	0	0	New
Democratic Liberation Party	129,138	3.86	4	0	New
The Front	129,138	3.86	0	0	New
Independents	16,496	0.49	14	1	–1
Total	3,341,822	100.00	2146	299	24
Source: La Prensa, CNE, CNE

== Reactions ==
=== International ===
- Organization of American States: the head of the Electoral Observation Mission of the OAS, Luis Guillermo Solís, remarked the responsibility with which Hondurans voted in an "atmosphere of peace and civility" and that the three majority political forces of the country contributed to celebrate "a peaceful election day". Even so, he regretted that an agreement was not reached to reform the electoral law and that the deficiencies detected must be improved.
- Canada: The Government of Canada congratulated Castro for being the first woman President-elect. Canada states that they are looking forward to work with Castro on several priorities, particularly democracy, inclusivity, abortion, and reducing corruption.
- Nicaragua: The President of Nicaragua Daniel Ortega and his Vice President Rosario Murillo congratulated among the first the candidate Xiomara Castro through an official statement published on 29 November 2021, stating: "Dear Xiomara, Dear Brothers: We salute with much respect and appreciation the progress towards the electoral triumph in Dear Honduras, where that Brother People lives the hope of better times. ... In our closeness and good neighborhood, we continue determined to advance creating the future.".
- Spain: The Government of Spain congratulated Xiomara Castro on her victory, which is "symbolising the achievements in the struggle for the equality of Honduran women". He also praised Castro's message of "reconciliation, peace and justice" in her victory speech and the Honduran people for a "smooth" election.
- United States: United States Secretary of State Antony Blinken congratulated Castro on her win following Asfura's concession. In a statement, he expressed congratulations to Castro for becoming the first female president of Honduras.
- Venezuela: President Nicolás Maduro expressed through Twitter his congratulations to Castro for her "historic victory".

=== National ===
- David Chávez, President of the National Party of Honduras announced that the party will contribute to a constructive opposition and that they were ready to work with the new government.

== Aftermath ==
A few months after the election and the end of Hernández's term, it was revealed that on 1 July 2021, Hernández had his visa revoked by the U.S. Department of State, due to involvements in corruption and in the illegal drug trade. On 14 February 2022, he was surrounded by the national police and DEA agents at his home in Tegucigalpa, after the U.S. government had requested his extradition for his involvement with narcotics. On 15 February 2022, he agreed to surrender to US authorities, and on 21 April, Hernández was extradited to the United States. On 8 March 2024, Hernández was convicted of three counts of drug trafficking and weapons conspiracy, the mandatory minimum sentence for which is 40 years in prison.
