= 2017 Honduran general election =

General election held in Honduras

- 26 November 2017
- Registered: 6,046,873
- Presidential election
- Turnout: 57.49% (▼1.65pp)
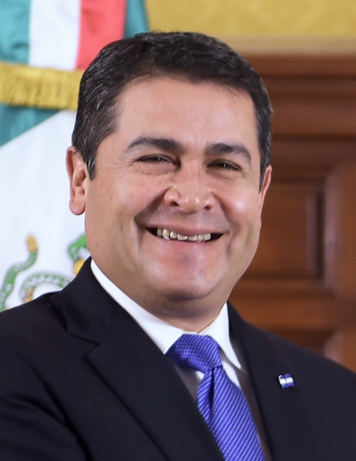

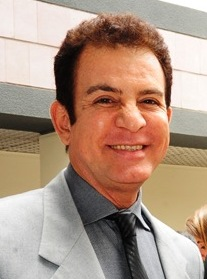

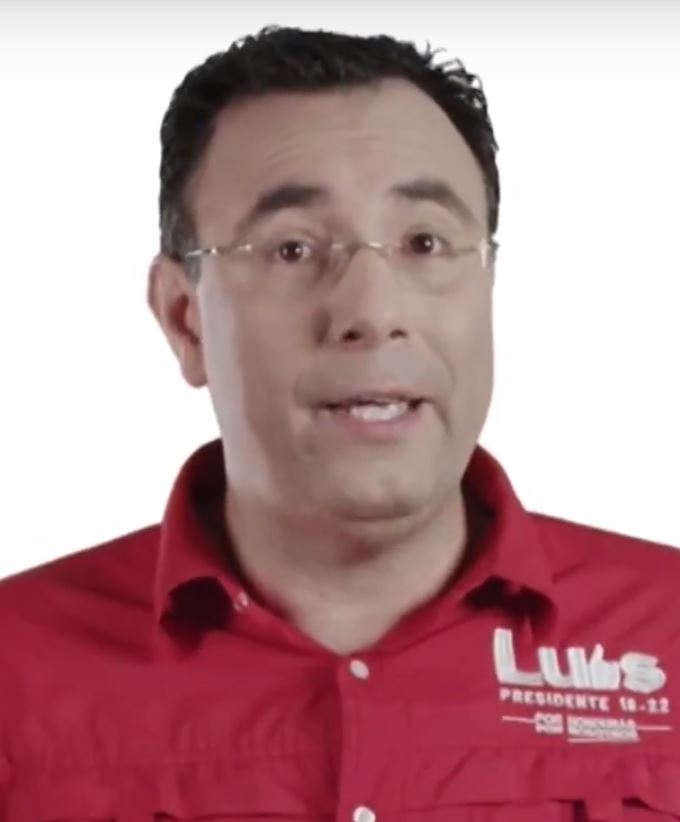
Nominee	Juan Orlando Hernández	Salvador Nasralla	Luis Zelaya
Party	National	Libre–PINU	Liberal
Running mate	Ricardo Álvarez Arias	Xiomara Castro	Yadira Bendaña
Popular vote	1,410,888	1,360,442	484,187
Percentage	42.95%	41.42%	14.74%
- Hernández: <40% 40–50% 50–60% 60–70% 70–80% Nasralla: <40% 40-50% 50–60% 60–70% Zelaya: <40% 40–50% 50–60% 60–70%
President before election
Juan Orlando Hernández
National
Elected President
Juan Orlando Hernández
National
- Parliamentary election
- All 128 seats in the National Congress; 65 seats needed for a majority
Party	Leader	Seats	+/–
National	Reinaldo Sánchez Rivera	61	+13
Libre	Manuel Zelaya	30	−7
Liberal	Luis Zelaya	26	−1
PINU	Guillermo Enrique Valle Marichal	4	+1
APH	Romeo Vásquez Velásquez	4	+4
UD	Alfonso Díaz Narváez	1	+1
CD	Augusto Cruz Ascensio	1	+1
PAC	Marlene Alvarenga	1	−12
This lists parties that won seats. See the complete results below.
Results of the congressional election
President of the Congress before	President of the Congress after
Mauricio Oliva; National	Mauricio Oliva; National

General elections were held in Honduras on 26 November 2017. Voters went to the polls to elect the President of Honduras to serve a four-year term, as well as 128 members of the unicameral National Congress, 20 members for the Central American Parliament and mayors for the municipalities of Honduras.

The election was the first after the controversial Supreme Court decision to allow a president to seek re-election, a controversial development since the mere possibility of changing the constitution to allow for re-election was a primary justification for the 2009 Honduran coup d'état. The sitting president, Juan Orlando Hernández had been the favorite going into the elections, but early results showed a significant advantage for his major challenger, Salvador Nasralla. As the Supreme Electoral Tribunal (TSE) slowly announced the vote totals, Hernández gained in the vote counts amid numerous irregularities, leading to cries of electoral fraud and protests across the country. The protests escalated over the next several days as the country awaited final results, and on 1 December, Juan Orlando Hernández's government issued a ten-day curfew to try to control the protests.

Following the elections, both candidates claimed victory. On 17 December, twenty-one days after the elections, Hernández was declared the winner by the TSE, which is dominated by Hernández loyalists. The Organization of American States (OAS), which conducted independent monitoring of the elections, found widespread irregularities in the conduct of the voting and doubted the validity of the official results. The OAS called for fresh elections.

== Background ==
Hernández was seeking re-election, having won the 2013 contest against Xiomara Castro and Salvador Nasralla in a controversial election marred by accusations of vote buying, fraud, intimidation, and other irregularities. This time around, Castro's Libre party united with the Innovation and Unity Party behind Nasralla in the Alliance against the Dictatorship, but concerns over the integrity over the process remained, especially when The Economist revealed a recording of what appeared to be a training session for poll workers from Hernández's National Party that included advocating for vote-rigging in five different ways as part of the party's strategy.

== Electoral system ==
The President of Honduras is elected by plurality, with the candidate receiving the most votes in a single round of voting declared the winner. The 128 members of the National Congress are elected by open list proportional representation from 18 multi-member constituencies based on the departments ranging in size from one to 23 seats. Seats are allocated using the Hare quota.

== Presidential candidates ==
Juan Orlando Hernández of the National Party, who has held office since winning the 2013 election, is the first president in Honduran history running for a second term since the constitution established in 1982, despite the fact that, Article 374 of the constitution of Honduras prohibits both presidential reelection and the altering of the article prohibiting reelection. Manuel Zelaya was ousted by a coup in 2009 for holding the Honduran fourth ballot box referendum, which some have claimed he was using to alter this article of the constitution. Comments he made shortly before being deposed seem to suggest he did believe the referendum would be effective in such a capacity. Because Zelaya could not run for office in the 2009 election, this change would have been made after he was out of office. Therefore, Zelaya would have only been able to run for reelection in 2013.

The left-wing Libre and PINU parties formed with the centre-right Anti-Corruption Party the Opposition Alliance against Dictatorship for this election, nominating PAC founder Salvador Nasralla as its candidate. Former Honduran president Manuel Zelaya, who was forced out of office in the coup in 2009, supported Nasralla and acted as a political strategist for the Opposition Alliance's campaign.

The centrist Liberal Party nominated former president of the Central American Technological University Luis Zelaya as its candidate.

Candidate	Running mates	Party
Juan Orlando Hernández	1. Ricardo Álvarez Arias; 2. Olga Margarita Alvarado Rodríguez; 3. María Antonia Rivera Rosales	National Party
Salvador Nasralla	1. Xiomara Castro; 2. Guillermo Enrique Valle Marichal; 3. Belinda María Carias Martínez	Liberty and Refoundation–PINU-SD
Luis Zelaya	1. Yadira Bendaña; 2. José Antonio Fernández Flores; 3. María Alicia Villela Meza	Liberal Party
Romeo Vásquez Velásquez	1. Nadia Kafaty Geadah; 2. Juan Juménez Castro; 3. Socorro Torres Amador	Honduran Patriotic Alliance
Marlene Alvarenga	1. Melbin Joaquín Maradiaga Medrano; 2. Antonia Lissete López Cruz; 3. Luis Saul Bueso Mazariegos	Anti-Corruption Party
Lucas Evangelisto Aguilera	1. Cherissa Carrole Rodríguez Campbell; 2. Adalberto Sabillon Pineda; 3. Paola Alejandra Tabora Torres	Christian Democratic Party
Alfonso Díaz Narváez	1. Diana Lorena Sierra Alvarado; 2. Víctor Alberto Amaya Ramos; 3. María Isabel Hernández Gálvez	Democratic Unification Party
Isaías Fonseca Aguilar	1. Maricela Yamileth Velasquez Pineda; 2. Cornelio Moncada Esterbrook; 3. Bianca Vanessa Cárdenas Zuniga	FAPER
Eliseo Vallecillo	1. Jessy Carolina Hernández Rivera; 2. Ángel Enoch Licona Paz; 3. Jackelin Yamileth Castro Murillo	Go-Solidary Movement

== Election administration ==
The President of the Supreme Electoral Tribunal, David Matamoros Batson, stated that the election budget is 1.098 million Honduran lempiras. Foreign officials from the United States Embassy, Organization of American States, and European Union conducted election monitoring.

== Results and aftermath ==
The polls closed at 16:00 local time (UTC−5) on election day, a change from years past when polls had closed at 17:00. Supporters of the opposition saw this as an attempt by the TSE, which is effectively controlled by Hernández's National Party, to suppress the vote. After voting, the TSE planned to begin releasing vote totals as they came out, but suspended the process for close to seven hours. Before any official results had been announced, Hernández declared himself the victor, and Nasralla followed by also claiming victory. The following day, the TSE released its first preliminary results: with 57% of the votes counted, Nasralla held a 5-point advantage over Hernández, with 45.17% to Hernández's 40.21%.

The TSE then halted the count for 36 hours and announced that final results may not become available until Thursday, 30 November. Over the course of the week, the TSE released updated vote totals, which saw Nasralla's lead steadily erode and Hernández pull ahead in the vote count. After the TSE again paused in its vote totals for several hours, claiming to have experienced a glitch in the computer system, Nasralla denounced the TSE for fraud, declared he would not recognize the results, and urged his supporters to take to the streets, which they did across the country. According to an analysis done by Georgetown University professor Irfan Nooruddin for the Organization of American States, there was a sudden swing in the vote totals after 68 percent of the votes were counted. Nooruddin concluded that the "differences are too large to be generated by chance and are not easily explicable, raising doubts as to the veracity of the overall result."

On 30 November, with approximately 94% of the votes counted, Hernández's lead had climbed to 42.92% compared to 41.42% for Nasralla. On 1 December, the TSE announced that they would give no further results until the TSE had been able to review all of the 1,031 tally sheets which had not been properly filled out by the political parties. The 1,031 tally sheets represent 5.69% of the total vote. Later that same day, as the TSE was still trying to convoke 60 representatives and four supervisors for both Nasralla and Hernández for the final vote count, Hernández's cabinet announced a ten-day curfew from 6pm to 6am to try to calm the violence associated with the protests.

On 2 December, the Honduran National Roundtable for Human Rights issued a press release, in which it declared that the government actions were state terrorism against civilians, it warned that the declaration of a state of exception was in order to create repression to ensure electoral fraud labeling it as illegal after reading several articles of the Honduran constitution.

As of 2 December, at least 7 people had died in the protests with more than 20 injured. On the second night of the curfew, thousands of people participated in what is known as "cacerolazos", banging pots and pans in protest.

As of 15 December 2017, the court had finished a recount of ballot boxes that presented irregularities but had still not declared a winner, and protests continued throughout the country, with 16 deaths and 1,675 arrests, according to Honduras' National Human Rights' Commission. The court has 30 days from the contest to do so.

The TSE finally announced a winner on 17 December, giving Hernández the victory with 42.95% of the vote to Nasralla's 41.42%. The announcement sparked a new wave of protests across the country, with Mel Zelaya announcing a national strike. The country's two major cities, Tegucigalpa and San Pedro Sula, saw streets blockaded, their main exits blocked, and traffic between them severely reduced.

Organization of American States (OAS) election monitors, in their final report, documented widespread and numerous irregularities in the conduct of the voting and ballot tabulation, and doubted the validity of the official results. OAS secretary general Luis Almagro issued a statement following the TSE's announcement saying: "Facing the impossibility of determining a winner, the only way possible so that the people of Honduras are the victors is a new call for general elections." Hernández rejected the OAS's position, and his top aide accused of OAS of seeking "to try and steal the election" for Nasralla.

The Economist analyzed the vote tallies as reported by the TSE and compared that information with census data to analyze the validity of Hernández's explanation for the sudden swing in the vote tallies: that the later votes came from areas with more National Party support. However, The Economist found that explanation implausible, noting that the swing happened in municipalities, which tend to be small and urban, across the country. The only other explanation for the swing in the vote tally would be that paper ballots favored Hernández by 18 percentage points where electronic ballots favored Nasralla by 5 percentage points, but, as The Economist noted, the "odds are that that didn't happen".

=== President ===
Candidate	Running mate	Party	Votes	%
Juan Orlando Hernández	Ricardo Álvarez Arias	National Party	1,410,888	42.95
Salvador Nasralla	Xiomara Castro	Liberty and Refoundation–PINU-SD	1,360,442	41.42
Luis Zelaya	Yadira Bendaña	Liberal Party	484,187	14.74
Romeo Vásquez Velásquez	Nadia Kafaty	Honduran Patriotic Alliance	6,517	0.20
Marlene Alvarenga	Melbin Maradiaga	Anti-Corruption Party	5,983	0.18
Lucas Aguilera	Cherissa Rodríguez	Christian Democratic Party	5,900	0.18
José Díaz	Diana Sierra	Democratic Unification Party	4,633	0.14
Isaías Fonseca	Maricela Velasquez	FAPER	3,151	0.10
Eliseo Vallecillo Reyes	Jessy Hernández	Go-Solidary Movement	3,003	0.09
Total			3,284,704	100.00
Valid votes			3,284,704	94.49
Invalid/blank votes			191,715	5.51
Total votes			3,476,419	100.00
Registered voters/turnout			6,046,873	57.49
Source: TSE

=== National Congress ===
Party	Seats	+/–
National Party	61	+13
Liberty and Refoundation	30	–7
Liberal Party	26	–1
Innovation and Unity Party	4	+3
Honduran Patriotic Alliance	4	+4
Democratic Unification Party	1	0
Christian Democratic Party	1	0
Anti-Corruption Party	1	–12
Total	128	0
Source: TSE

== Reactions ==
=== Countries ===
Despite concerns over election fraud, the United States recognized Hernández as the winner. However, in a statement, the U.S. Department of State said that "The close election results, irregularities identified by the OAS and the EU election observation missions, and strong reactions from Hondurans across the political spectrum underscore the need for a robust national dialogue" and called for "much-needed electoral reforms should be undertaken." Twenty-seven members of Congress sent a letter to President Trump urging him to "join the Organization of American States in calling for new elections, and to stand behind the right of the Honduran people to free and fair elections, in accordance with Honduran law" and expressed alarm at Honduran security forces's use of force against "civilians protesting electoral fraud." In a separate letter, 20 members of Congress wrote to Secretary of State Rex Tillerson expressing concern about the State Department's response to the elections, which the members called "inadequate."

Canada and Mexico also recognized Hernández as the winner. In a statement, the Mexican foreign ministry stated: "Mexico respectfully calls for the democratic institutions, the political forces and the people of Honduras, in a mark of respect and agreement, to definitively conclude this electoral process."

=== The United Nations ===
On 12 March 2018, the UN Human Rights Office issued a statement about a UN report on Honduras presidential election saying that "members of the Honduran security forces, in particular the military police, used excessive – including lethal – force to control and disperse protests that erupted following November's disputed presidential election". The report "found that at least 22 civilians and one police officer were killed during the protests". The report says, "These cases raise serious concerns and may amount to extrajudicial killings,"

=== Supranational bodies ===
- Organization of American States — The OAS said that the official results could not be accepted as valid, citing multiple irregularities. The leader of the OAS's election observation mission, former Bolivian President Jorge Quiroga, said: "The tight margin, along with the irregularities, errors and systematic problems that have surrounded this election, does not allow the mission to be certain about the results." When the final results of the presidential election were announced three weeks after voting, the OAS immediately called for new elections.
