= 2022 Honduran political crisis =

Legislative crisis

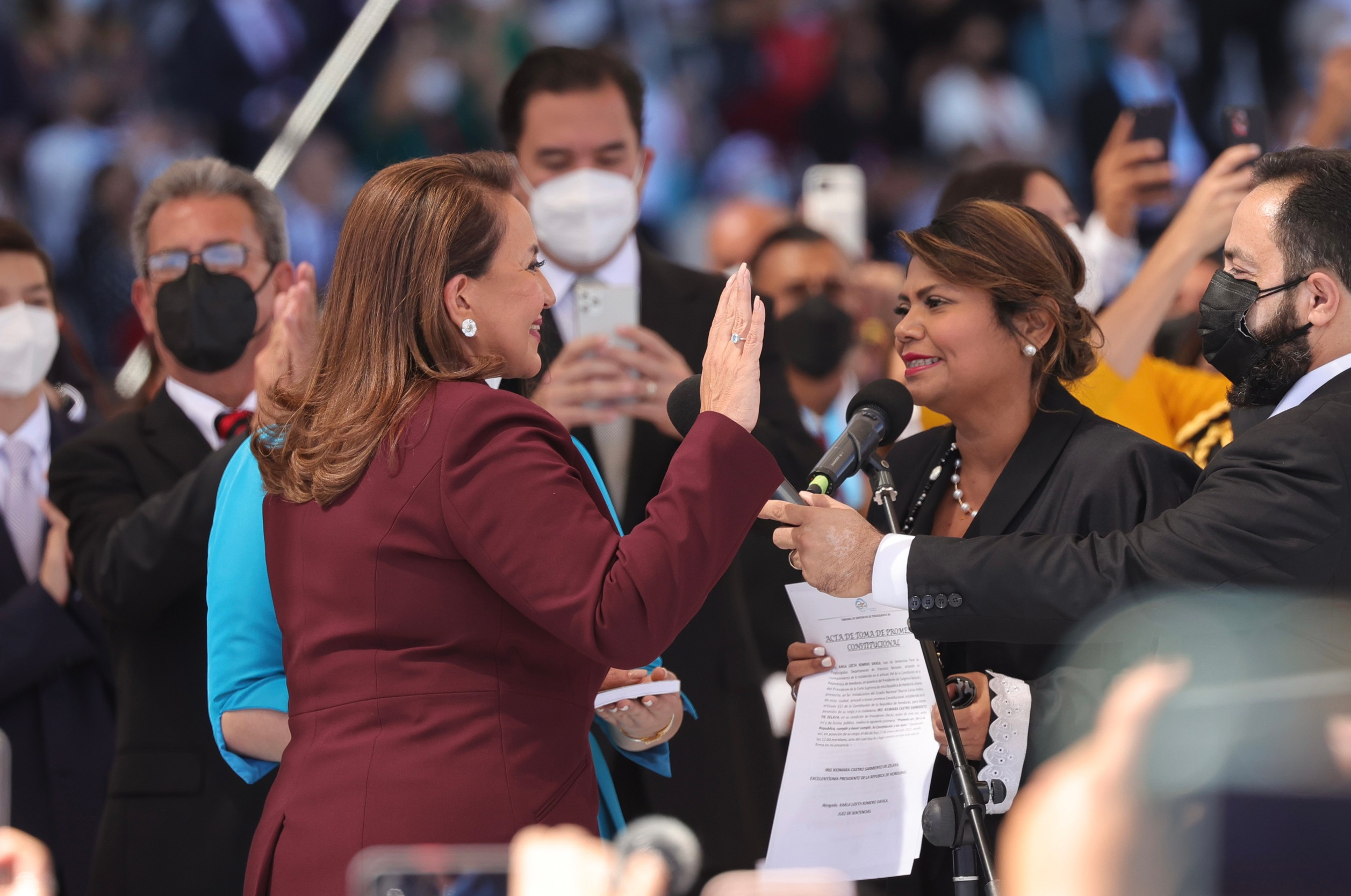
Xiomara Castro (left) is sworn in as president by Judge Karla Romero (center). Congressman Luis Redondo holds the microphone.

The 2022 Honduran political crisis began on January 23 when president-elect Xiomara Castro did not recognize the legitimacy of the National Congress's board of directors. The board, presided over by Jorge Cálix, had been selected that morning by 79 of the 128 elected deputies. Later, in an unofficial session after entering the National Congress facilities, a separate group of deputies selected a different board, presided over by Luis Redondo and supported by Castro.

Redondo's nomination was part of a pre-electoral pact between Castro and her vice president, Salvador Nasralla. Following the 2021 Honduran general election, Redondo, a member of the Savior Party of Honduras, was unable to secure enough votes to be elected president of Congress, failing to gain the support of all the elected deputies from Castro's own Liberty and Refoundation (Libre) party.

To avoid conflicts over legality, Castro was sworn in as president by a judge, acting in the absence of the presidents of the legislative and judicial branches. Castro later sent draft bills to the Luis Redondo-led faction, which, despite being a minority of official deputies, passed them into law from the congressional chamber.

On February 7, Jorge Cálix and the other dissident deputies signed an agreement to support Redondo as president of Congress. However, organizations such as the National Party, the Liberal Party, the Netherlands Institute for Multiparty Democracy (NIMD), the Honduran Council of Private Enterprise, and the National Anti-Corruption Council had questioned the legality of Redondo's board and advocated for a process to legitimize it. This did not happen, and Redondo continued to preside over the board with the approval of his allied deputies.

== Background ==
On October 13, 2021, Salvador Nasralla of the Savior Party of Honduras (PSH) withdrew his presidential candidacy to become the first presidential designate (a vice-presidential role) on the ticket of the Libre Party, joining presidential candidate Xiomara Castro for the election scheduled for November 28. The alliance included an agreement to form a legislative coalition, which stipulated that a PSH member aligned with Nasralla would be appointed to preside over the National Congress. Castro won the election. The new Congress was composed of 50 members from Libre, 44 from the National Party, 22 from the Liberal Party (PLH), 10 from PSH, 1 from the Christian Democratic Party (DC), and 1 from the Anti-Corruption Party (PAC).

On December 9, the PLH announced it would support a candidate from Libre to head Congress, citing respect for the majority's will. On December 23, president-elect Xiomara Castro and vice president-elect Salvador Nasralla nominated PSH congressman Luis Redondo to lead Congress. Although Nasralla and PSH general coordinator Pedro Barquero claimed Redondo had enough votes, several Libre members opposed his nomination, including Edgardo Castro and Beatriz Valle, preferring fellow Libre deputy Jorge Cálix. On January 4, 2022, Libre's newly elected deputy Yahvé Sabillón said many of the party's lawmakers were undecided and preferred to vote for someone from their own party. On January 13, another Libre deputy-elect, Marco Girón, stated that Redondo still lacked support from at least 20 deputies in the bloc.

On January 20, Libre's general coordinator, Manuel Zelaya, called a meeting with the party's elected deputies. Twenty did not attend, which Libre described in a statement as a "sign of counterrevolutionary betrayal." The next day, Jorge Cálix was elected provisional president of Congress with the support of 84 deputies, including the 20 dissident Libre members. His election caused unrest in the chamber among the remaining Libre deputies and created a schism within the party. (Note: That day, Cálix and 17 other deputies who did not back down were expelled from Libre by president-elect Xiomara Castro, who labeled them "rebels" and "traitors.")

After the session, Libre spokesperson Rasel Tomé named a provisional board with Redondo as president in a symbolic act, which lacked the necessary votes. Tomé complained that the Minister of Governance, who presided over the session, (Note: This complied with Article 16 of the Internal Rules of the National Congress.) did not allow him to present his motion. In a statement, Beatriz Valle, who submitted the winning motion for Cálix, explained that standard congressional procedure dictates that once a motion has clear majority support (Valle's motion had 84 signatures), opposing motions are not considered because they cannot mathematically pass.

== Development ==
On the night of January 22, 2022, President-elect Xiomara Castro called on her supporters to hold a vigil outside the National Congress until the official board of directors for the 2022–2026 term was chosen the following day. Castro appeared at the vigil and delivered a speech. Due to the gathering, the congressional session on the morning of January 23 was held at a private club in Bosques de Zambrano. (Note: According to Article 3 of the Internal Regulations of the National Congress: "The National Congress shall hold sessions in the Hall of the Legislative Palace, but may also hold them in another location and anywhere in the Republic where it is convened by the Board of Directors, if circumstances require.") There, Jorge Cálix was ratified as the official president, and his board was appointed with the support of 79 deputies: 44 from the PNH, 19 from Libre, 15 from the PLH, and one from the PAC.

Twenty minutes later, a separate group of deputies, accompanied by Libre supporters, entered the legislative chamber and, in an unofficial session, (Note: According to Article 14 of the Internal Regulations of the National Congress, it is the Provisional Board that "shall issue the necessary provisions for the election of the permanent Board of Directors.") appointed another board presided over by Luis Redondo. To reach the 65-vote minimum, 18 alternate deputies were seated to replace the dissident Libre members who were at the Bosques de Zambrano session. (Note: According to Article 19 of the Internal Regulations of the National Congress, alternate deputies are "called by the Board of Directors.") Castro reacted in a tweet: "I recognize the presidency of Congress headed by Deputy Luis Redondo and invite him to my swearing-in ceremony alongside the people on January 27."

On the night of January 23, union members and Libre supporters occupied the National Printing Office (Enag), where the official gazette La Gaceta is printed, to prevent the publication of the board presided over by Cálix, a legal requirement. That night, Redondo's board was printed in an unauthorized edition of La Gaceta. The manager of Enag stated that the publication was invalid, as it was not authorized by her or the newspaper's coordinator. The same day, two Libre deputies from the congressional board withdrew their support for Jorge Cálix.

On January 25, deputies were sworn in during separate ceremonies: 79 in a virtual session presided over by Cálix, and the remainder in the congressional chamber with Redondo, who cited the unauthorized La Gaceta publication as proof of his board's legality. The chamber was guarded by military cadets under the command of President-elect Xiomara Castro. The Executive and Judicial branches submitted their management reports to the Legislature presided over by Jorge Cálix, as required by law. Cálix invited Xiomara Castro to dialogue, and the two met that Wednesday night. Castro then publicly proposed that Cálix join her administration as Cabinet Coordinator, an offer he said he would consider.

On January 27, President Castro was sworn into office. To ensure the legitimacy of her appointment, the oath was administered by Judge Karla Lizeth Romero Dávila, at the request of event organizers. This followed Article 244 of the Constitution:

The oath of office of the President and appointed officials of the Republic shall be taken before the President of the National Congress, if it is in session, and in their absence, before the President of the Supreme Court of Justice. If neither is available, it may be taken before any district or municipal judge in the Republic.

The constitutional oath certificate noted that the judge presided "in the absence of the President of the National Congress and the President of the Supreme Court of Justice." Luis Redondo, who was not recognized in the act, stood nearby holding a microphone.

On January 28, a motion of unconstitutionality was filed with the Supreme Court against the board presided over by Jorge Cálix. Concurrently, a protective order (amparo) was filed seeking to suspend Luis Redondo. The 44 deputies of the National Party also filed a criminal complaint against Redondo for usurpation of public office, disruption of government functions, and forgery. On February 2, the Supreme Court declared the motions inadmissible, citing a failure to meet legal grounds and procedural deficiencies. In the early hours of February 2, Jorge Cálix met with Libre's coordinator, Manuel Zelaya, though no details were disclosed.

Despite the institutional conflict, President Xiomara Castro submitted draft laws to the Luis Redondo faction. They passed laws with the participation of 52 sitting deputies and their alternates, as well as the alternates of dissenting Libre deputies. The laws were published in the official gazette La Gaceta. Their legality was challenged in a joint communiqué by the Honduran Council of Private Enterprise (Cohep) and the National Anti-Corruption Council, as well as by legal analysts.

== Resolution ==
On the afternoon of February 7, 2022, following a meeting between Libre's general coordinator, Manuel Zelaya, and the 17 dissenting deputies, an agreement was signed. Jorge Cálix relinquished his claim to the presidency of Congress in favor of Luis Redondo, stating he did so "to maintain peace" and for the "country's stability," though he expressed "regret" that Redondo would preside. The agreement included a statement by the other dissenters expressing their disagreement with Redondo's nomination. However, all pledged to support the decisions and projects of President Xiomara Castro. (Note: The agreement included the reintegration of the dissenting deputies into the Libre caucus, restoring its majority in Congress.)

The next day, during a session presided over by Redondo, the National Party caucus called for a new vote to elect the Board of Directors, a move intended to formally legitimize Redondo's board. A few National Party deputies held signs in support of the motion. However, the proposal was not considered, as Redondo and his allies maintained that his board was already legitimate. Shortly afterward, Cálix entered the chamber with the dissenting deputies and a group of mariachis performing El Rey. He greeted the members of the board of directors and declared he was "ready to legislate from his seat." Later, Cálix stated that the legality of Redondo's board was no longer his concern.

Constitutional analyst Jhonatan Rosales and Luis León, director of the Netherlands Institute for Multiparty Democracy (NIMD), stated that an internal congressional process was necessary to formally legitimize Redondo's presidency. They warned that without it, the board's actions and passed legislation could be subject to legal challenges. No such process took place.

== Reactions ==
On January 23, the Liberal Party issued a statement affirming its respect for institutional authority and its support for the votes cast by its deputies. It expressed hope that Libre would resolve its internal differences through dialogue. The National Party also released a statement reaffirming its support for Jorge Cálix and its rejection of interference in the Legislative Branch.

On January 25, the UN Secretary-General, António Guterres, called for "constructive and peaceful dialogue to resolve differences within the framework of the constitutional process."

The Honduran Council of Private Enterprise (COHEP), in a January 28 statement addressing the crisis's economic impact, urged political leaders to "urgently reach political and amicable solutions."

On January 29, U.S. Assistant Secretary of State for Western Hemisphere Affairs, Brian A. Nichols, tweeted: "The United States urges Honduran political figures to engage in peaceful, constitutional dialogue to resolve the leadership of the Honduran Congress. All parties must participate peacefully and refrain from acts of intimidation."

On February 7, following the agreement within the Libre party, both the National and Liberal parties issued statements expressing their desire to see the Congress's Board of Directors legitimized. The National Party proposed holding a new vote to elect the Board.
