= Fourth ballot box =

Fourth ballot box may refer to:

- Honduran fourth ballot box referendum, a political initiative of Honduran president Manuel Zelaya
- Nicaraguan fourth ballot box, a political initiative by Nicaraguan president Daniel Ortega
