= 2017 supranational electoral calendar =

Supranational elections held in 2017.

== February ==
- 19 February: Andean Parliament, Ecuador

== November ==
- 26 November: Central American Parliament, Honduras
