= Uth =

UTH or Uth may refer to:

== Universities ==
- University of Texas Health Science Center at Houston
- University of Texas at Houston (School of Public Health, Medical School, Dental Branch, ...)
- University of Thessaly, Greek university
- Universidad Tecnológica de Honduras

== Surname ==
- Mark Uth (born 1991), German footballer
- Max Uth (1863–1914), German painter

== Other uses ==
- Udon Thani International Airport, Thailand, International Air Transport Association airport code
- Untrihexium (Uth), an unsynthesized chemical element
- Ultimate Texas Hold'em, a variant of the poker game Texas Hold'em
