= Marlene Alvarenga =

Honduran politician

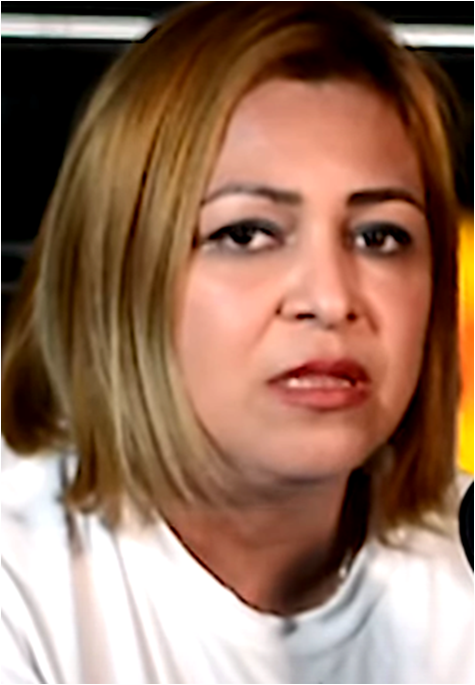
- Alvarenga in 2021

Member of the National Congress of Honduras
- Incumbent
- Assumed office 2013

Personal details
- Born: 14 February 1985 (age 41) Tegucigalpa, Honduras
- Party: Anti-Corruption
- Education: Universidad Tecnológica de Honduras (MA)

Marlene Alvarenga (born 14 February 1985), is a Honduran politician and pastor, current president of Anti-Corruption Party since 22 May 2017 and candidate to president in 2017 general election and member of the National Congress since 2013.

== Biography ==
Marlene was born in Tegucigalpa into a Christian Evangelical family where politics was a taboo subject. She completed her studies at the Normal School of Spain of Danlí, and obtained her university degree at the Technological University of Honduras (UTH), where she also obtained her master's degree in human resources.

Before being elected deputy in 2013, Marlene and her husband, police officer Rubén Santos Rivera, were pastors who were dedicated to preaching the word of God in an evangelical church. This while Marlene was waiting for her second child. She was also dedicated to helping children in need of the street.

After what she calls "a call from the Lord" and the influence she received from Salvador Nasralla watching him on television, Marlene became interested in the PAC and her desire to put an end to bipartisanship and corruption. She started to attend the meetings of the political party until he became fully involved in it and during the general elections of 2013 she was 18th in the lists by the department of Francisco Morazán.

She was elected president of the PAC after defeating Nasralla in the internal elections

She has been involved in several controversies, such as filing a motion to change a part of the anthem, call for the Christianity to be the state religion, when Honduras has always had a secular constitution, the expulsion of Osman Chávez from the party in 2018, accused of electoral fraud in the elections of 2017 and was accused of being part of Cachiros criminal organization.
