= Jorge Aguilar Paredes =

Honduran politician

- Born: 9 March 1966 (age 60)
- Occupations: Politician, President of the PINU
- Political party: Innovation and Unity Party

Jorge Rafael Aguilar Paredes (born 9 March 1966) is a Honduran politician, he is President of his party, and presidential candidate of the Innovation and Unity Party for the 2013 general elections.
