= Savior Party of Honduras =

Political party

Savior Party of Honduras Partido Salvador de Honduras
- Leader: Fátima Mena
- Founder: Salvador Nasralla
- Founded: 12 November 2019
- Registered: 7 September 2020
- Split from: Anti-Corruption Party
- Headquarters: Tegucigalpa
- Ideology: Populism
- Political position: Center
- National affiliation: National Opposition Union of Honduras
- Colours: Light blue Green; Orange; White
- National Congress: 0 / 128

Website
- partidosalvadordehonduras.com

The Savior Party of Honduras (Spanish: Partido Salvador de Honduras, PSH, stylised as "Partido Sal✓ador de Honduras"), sometimes translated as the Savior of Honduras Party, is a populist political party in Honduras founded in 2020 by Salvador Nasralla, founder and member of the Anti-Corruption Party until 2017.

== History ==
On 12 November 2019, Salvador Nasralla presented the Supreme Electoral Tribunal (CNE) with the necessary documents to form a new political party.

The CNE made the registration official on 7 September 2020. The party presented 65,694 signatures, as well as the organization of the departmental and municipal authorities of the party.

== Elections ==
An alliance was originally proposed for the 2021 presidential election with Luis Zelaya of the Liberal Party (who previously ran and finished third in the 2017 presidential election, and who opposes the candidacy of fellow Liberal Party member Yani Rosenthal, who completed a prison sentence in the United States in 2020 for laundering drug money), Nelson Avila and Wilfredo Méndez of LIBRE and independent candidate Milton Benítez. Eventually, an alliance was agreed to between Zelaya of the Liberal Party and the Innovation and Unity Party. Should one of the candidates in the alliance make it to the second round, they will earn an endorsement from the other(s) who did not qualify.

== Electoral history ==
=== Presidential elections ===
Election	Party candidate	Votes	%	Result
2021	Alexander Mira	5,711	0.17%	Lost ✗

=== National Congress elections ===
Election	Votes	%	Seats	+/–	Position
2021		12.73%	10 / 128	New	3rd
