= Salvador Nasralla =

First Vice President of Honduras from 2022 to 2024

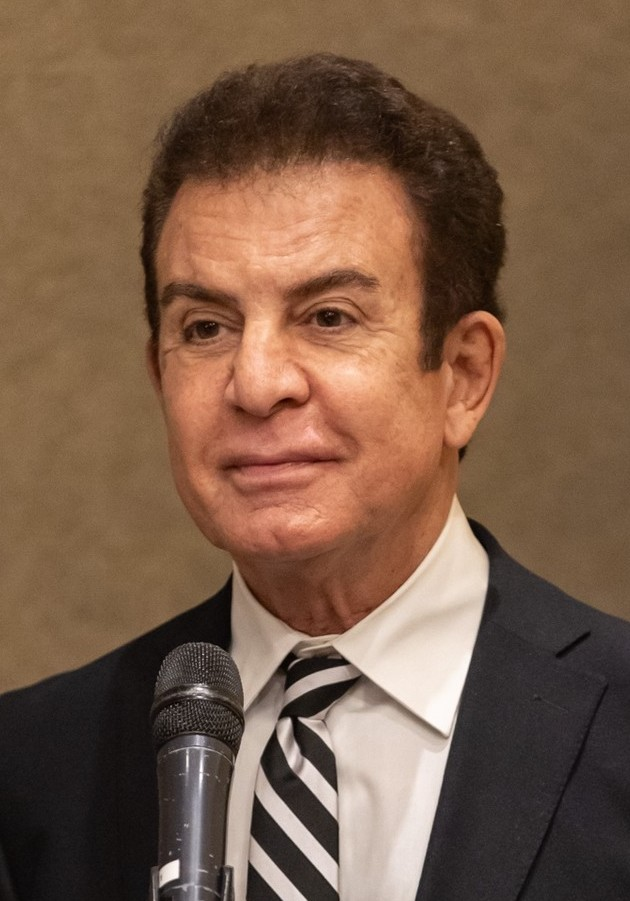
- Nasralla in 2022

First Vice President of Honduras
- In office 27 January 2022 – 30 April 2024 Serving with Doris Gutiérrez and Renato Florentino
- President: Xiomara Castro
- Preceded by: Ricardo Álvarez Arias
- Succeeded by: Maria Antonieta Mejia (2026)

Leader of the Savior Party of Honduras
- In office 12 November 2019 – 1 July 2024
- Preceded by: Party established
- Succeeded by: Fátima Mena

Personal details
- Born: Salvador Alejandro César; Nasralla Salum; 30 January 1953 (age 73) Tegucigalpa, Honduras
- Citizenship: Honduras • Chile
- Party: Liberal (since 2024)
- Other political affiliations: PAC (2013–2017); PSH (2019–2024)
- Spouse: Iroshka Lindaly Elvir (m. 2016)
- Children: 2
- Education: Pontifical Catholic University of Chile (BE); Pontifical Catholic University of Chile (MBA)
- Occupation: Civil engineer • business administrator • sports journalist • politician

Salvador Alejandro César Nasralla Salum (Note: Arabic: سلفادور أليخاندرو سيزار نصر الله سلوم) (born 30 January 1953) is a Honduran politician who served as the First Vice President of Honduras from 2022 until his resignation in 2024. A member of the Liberal Party, he has been described as a centrist. He describes himself as center-right.

Nasralla began his career in business, before becoming the presenter of the TV programs 5 Deportivo and X-0 da Dinero; he has been called "El señor de la televisión" ("The TV Man"). He founded the Anti-Corruption Party in 2011 and stood for president in the 2013 Honduran general election, coming in fourth place. Nasralla ran again in the 2017 general election for the political alliance Alianza de Oposición contra la Dictadura, comprising Liberty and Refoundation (Libre) and the Innovation and Unity Party; he narrowly lost to incumbent President Juan Orlando Hernández, despite widespread claims of fraud and irregularities. After the election Nasralla temporarily retired from politics before creating the Savior Party of Honduras in 2019. Initially planning to run as the party's presidential nominee, he ultimately withdrew his candidacy to become the running mate of Libre presidential nominee Xiomara Castro, who would win the 2021 general election. After serving as Vice President for two years, Nasralla resigned to run unsuccessfully in the 2025 general election, securing the nomination of the Liberal Party, but losing to National Party nominee Nasry Asfura by a narrow margin.

== Early life ==
Nasralla was born in Tegucigalpa on January 30, 1953. His parents, Alejandro Nasralla and Alicia Salum, are Palestinian Christians from Beit Jala east of Bethlehem, and his mother was born in Chile. He spent his childhood in the northern city of Trujillo, Colón. At the age of eleven, his family returned to Tegucigalpa. There, he completed his secondary studies at Instituto San Francisco and obtained his high school diploma. During his adolescence he began working as a journalist, at Emisoras Unidas from 1966 to 1969, and in Uniradio and Radio Católica. He also took classes in drama and television.

After high school, Nasralla was sent to live with his maternal aunt and uncle in Santiago de Chile. There, he attended the Catholic University of Chile where he graduated with honors. He obtained a degree in Civil Industrial Engineering (specializing in construction). He subsequently earned a Master of Business Administration from the same university.

== Professional career ==
After returning from Chile, Nasralla became the CEO of Pepsi Honduras. He also became a professor at the National Autonomous University of Honduras, where he gave lectures on business and engineering. During this period, Nasralla expressed disappointment with the educational standards he observed, noting the low level of education among his students.

In 1981, he started his career in television by hosting the program "5 Deportivo," which continues to be broadcast every Sunday on Channel 5 of Corporación Televicentro to this day. He served as the head of press for the Honduran soccer team during their participation in the 1982 World Cup in Spain. On 3 March 1990, Nasralla launched "X-0 da Dinero," a quiz show offering cash prizes, which has become one of the most popular TV shows in Honduras, still airing every Sunday.

Beyond these shows, Nasralla has been the presenter and director of various programs and special events, including the Miss Honduras beauty pageant and the dance competition show "Bailando por un sueño" (Honduras). He has also represented Televicentro as a special envoy to the Viña del Mar music festival in Chile. Additionally, Nasralla is a columnist for Diario Diez and hosted his political proselytism program, "Salvador a las 7," which was broadcast for two years every Sunday on Hondured Channel 13 and is available on his official YouTube channel.

== Political career ==
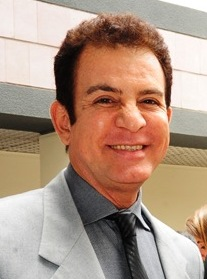
Nasralla in 2013

=== 2013 presidential campaign ===
Before 2013, Nasralla, Luis Redondo, and others formed the Anti-Corruption Party (PAC). By August 2013, the PAC was officially recognized as a political party by the Supreme Electoral Tribunal of Honduras, appointing Nasralla as its president and Rafael Virgilio Padilla Paz as vice president. This enabled Nasralla to participate in the 2013 presidential election. He was the official presidential candidate for the PAC in the November 2013 elections. He received 418,443 votes, 13.43% of the total. In a 2019 interview, Nasralla claimed that he had actually won the election with 1,066,000 votes, but due to the absence of his party's representatives at the polling stations, the majority parties — the National Party, National Party, and Liberty and Refoundation (Libre) — were able to manipulate the vote counts against him.

Throughout his campaign, Nasralla was openly critical of the three major political parties in Honduras. In his interactions with the media, he stated, "The worst thing that can happen to Honduras is [the election of] Partido Libre or Partido Nacional, the two extremist parties that have plunged the country into underdevelopment." He further commented on the similarity between the Liberal and National Parties, describing them as "the same thing," with one representing the extreme right and the other the extreme left. Additionally, Nasralla clarified his stance regarding the Liberty and Refoundation Party (Libre), emphasizing that he had "nothing to do with Libre," in response to what he perceived as an extensive campaign by the nationalists to associate him with that political faction.

These assertions gained further credibility a decade later when the U.S. Attorney's Office for the Southern District of New York provided a summary of evidence, just months before the trial of former Honduran President Juan Orlando Hernández was set to begin. The allegations detailed in this evidence include electoral fraud in both the 2013 and 2017 elections, alongside accusations of bribery and protection afforded to drug traffickers, including the notorious Sinaloa cartel. These were part of the shocking revelations from the New York Prosecutor's Office regarding the case against the former president.

During the party's registration process, the Scout movement of Honduras raised concerns about the PAC's use of the fleur-de-lis, an emblem also associated with the international Scout movement. Ultimately, both parties agreed to a resolution regarding the use of the insignia.

==== Aftermath ====
During the first year of the new government in 2014, Salvador Nasralla, as president of the Anti-Corruption Party (PAC), raised concerns about the integrity of some members within his party. In September of that year, he publicly denounced that none of the 13 PAC deputies in Congress had complied with the agreed salary contribution to the party. By mid-2015, internal conflicts escalated within PAC when Nasralla criticized several PAC deputies, labeling them as "bad apples", with the exception of Luis Redondo, the head of the bench. This criticism came after these deputies supported a reform to the Social Security law.

As a result of these tensions, 11 deputies voted to change the leadership of the bench, replacing the chief and deputy chief with Fátiman Mena. Nasralla attributed this shift in leadership to the influence of the National Party on the PAC deputies. Towards the end of 2015, further disputes arose between Nasralla and other party leaders, including Luis Redondo. Nasralla disclosed that Redondo had blocked his accounts on social networks, highlighting ongoing discord within the party leadership.

In February 2016, Salvador Nasralla labeled PAC deputies Marlene Alvarenga, Kritza Pérez, Ana Joselina Fortín, and a substitute deputy as traitors for not adhering to the party’s guidelines during the election of the new Supreme Court of Justice, suggesting that they had received bribes for their actions. As a result, Marlene Alvarenga accused Nasralla of mistreating the female deputies of PAC, and Ana Joselina resigned from her deputy leadership position in the PAC congressional group.

Nasralla denied these accusations in an interview, further criticizing the PAC bench by stating it was "no longer of any use to him" because it had "compromised the future of Honduras" by electing a Court allied with President Juan Orlando Hernández. He also stated that the four deputies who had not followed the party line were now part of the National Party. Several months later, Ana Joselina and Kritza Pérez resigned from PAC, which Nasralla described as a "self-cleansing" of the political institution. By the end of 2016, another deputy, Jaime Villegas, resigned following Nasralla's expressions of regret for having brought "public figures to PAC, like football players."

During 2016, Salvador Nasralla faced further internal conflict within the Anti-Corruption Party (PAC) after he chose to appoint two advisors who were not members of PAC. This decision led to confrontations with Deputy Luis Redondo and Deputy Fátima Mena, who both disapproved of the appointments. Nasralla subsequently launched several attacks against them. On one occasion, he suggested that Mena, "probably because of her youth and because she is a woman," was susceptible to being deceived by other deputies. Mena condemned this statement, calling it an attack on both youth and women.

Additionally, following several public remarks by Redondo about Nasralla and the ongoing conflicts within PAC, Nasralla responded by claiming that Redondo suffered from a mental illness, which, according to Nasralla, discredited his statements. On 2 November 2016, Redondo expelled Virgilio Padilla, an ally of Nasralla, from the National Council—the highest governing body of PAC. This left the Council composed of Nasralla, Redondo and his wife, and Fátima Mena.

In 2017, the Anti-Corruption Party (PAC) conducted two internal election processes. The first one took place on 9 April, which was deemed illegal by the Supreme Electoral Tribunal (TSE) just two days earlier. The TSE declared the elections non-compliant with the Electoral and Political Organizations Law because the call for elections was made on 2 December 2016, at a time when the National Council—the highest governing body of PAC—was vacant. The TSE then ordered the elections to be rescheduled for 21 May, ensuring compliance with the law.

Despite the TSE's mandate, Salvador Nasralla and his supporters proceeded with the elections on 9 April. For these elections, they compiled an electoral census of 25,000 people who cast their votes in 170 polling stations across the country. The ballots listed two movements: the Salvador Nasralla Movement and United for Honduras, led by Marlene Alvarenga, who decided not to participate in these elections. Nasralla declared himself the winner, although the TSE did not recognize the results of these elections.

On 21 May, the Anti-Corruption Party (PAC) held the rescheduled internal elections, as mandated by the Supreme Electoral Tribunal. In these elections, all three factions within the party rallied behind a consensus candidate, PAC deputy Marlene Alvarenga, who had previously been in bitter conflict with Salvador Nasralla. Following these elections, Alvarenga emerged as the new president of the PAC and its official candidate for future electoral contests.

=== 2013 electoral fraud ===
Documents declassified in May 2023 by the New York Attorney General's Office concerning the trial of Juan Orlando Hernández revealed details of his actions during the 2013 presidential campaign. According to these documents, Hernández relied on an individual referred to as "CW-1" to assist in committing electoral fraud. CW-1 regularly met with Juan Orlando to discuss strategies, which included the payment of bribes in certain departments of Honduras where Hernández was trailing in the polls. The documents state that CW-1, along with Hernández's brothers, used drug money to bribe officials at those polling stations to manipulate the vote counts in Hernández's favor.

Additionally, the documents detail a meeting between Hernández and an engineer responsible for managing the servers of the Supreme Electoral Tribunal (TSE), the body responsible for certifying election results. The engineer was instructed to shut down the servers, facilitating further manipulation of the vote count in favor of Hernández. These revelations corroborate the pre- and post-election statements and allegations made by Salvador Nasralla in 2013 regarding electoral fraud.

=== 2017 presidential campaign ===
On 20 May 2017, amid the internal election controversy within the Anti-Corruption Party (PAC), Salvador Nasralla was introduced at an assembly as the official presidential candidate for the Opposition Alliance Against Dictatorship. This alliance comprised the Liberty and Refoundation Party (Libre) and the Innovation and Unity Party (PINU). During the assembly, the alliance also outlined their government proposals in the event of a victory in the upcoming November general elections. Key proposals included the reform of the Honduran constitution and the establishment of an International Commission Against Impunity in Honduras.

In the 2017 presidential election, he represented the left-wing coalition, gaining only slightly fewer votes than the incumbent winner. Despite allegations of widespread irregularities, the United States recognised the reelection of President Juan Orlando Hernández (often abbreviated as JOH). The protests continued into February 2018, resulting in dozens of deaths and substantial economic losses due to damage to businesses. Both the Opposition Alliance and the Liberal Party rejected the official results, proclaiming Nasralla as the legitimate winner of the election.

According to documents declassified in May 2023 by prosecutors in New York, the 2017 presidential election in Honduras involved significant electoral fraud. These documents were part of the trial against the former President Juan Orlando Hernández (often abbreviated as JOH), who was accused of using drug trafficking proceeds to secure his re-election. Prosecutors allege that Hernández and his drug trafficking allies funneled millions of dollars from drug operations to ensure he remained in power and that his large-scale cocaine activities continued without interference.

Similar to the 2013 elections, it is claimed that Hernández used this illicit money to bribe election officials and manipulate vote counts. The allegations include shutting down the electoral computer system with the assistance of an engineer to alter the results in favor of Hernández. Despite official results showing Hernández as the winner, the declassified documents and allegations suggest that Salvador Nasralla, the opposition candidate, actually won a majority of the vote, holding 57% according to the New York prosecutors' assessment. These findings support Nasralla's own claims of fraud both before and after the 2017 elections, suggesting that he was the legitimate winner and should have been the president-elect of Honduras for the term beginning in 2018.

=== 2021 presidential election ===
On 12 November 2019, Salvador Nasralla submitted the necessary documents to the National Electoral Council (CNE) to register his new political party, the Salvador Party of Honduras (PSH). The party was officially established on 7 September 2020. Following its formation, the PSH entered into an alliance with the Innovation and Unity Party (PINU) to create the National Opposition Union (Unión Nacional Opositora). his coalition nominated Nasralla as its presidential candidate, with Congresswoman Doris Gutiérrez as the first nominee for vice president, and Dr. Suyapa Figueroa, a prominent media figure opposed to the government of Juan Orlando Hernández, as the first deputy vice president.

On 13 October, Nasralla formed a de facto alliance with the Liberty and Refoundation Party (Libre) in which he stepped down from his presidential candidacy. Under this new arrangement, he was registered as the candidate for the first presidential nominee on the Libre ticket, alongside Doris Gutiérrez from the Innovation and Unity Party-Social Democracy (PINU-SD). The agreement between the National Opposition Union (UNOH), consisting of the Salvador Party of Honduras (PSH) and PINU, and Libre stipulated that Nasralla would have the authority to select a PSH deputy to serve as the president of the National Congress.

Nasralla entered the race for president of Honduras again in 2021, this time as a candidate for the Savior Party. However, he later dropped out and became the running mate of LIBRE party nominee and former first lady Xiomara Castro. They went on to win the election. Nasralla assumed office as First Vice President on 27 January 2022.

=== 2022 Congressional leadership dispute ===
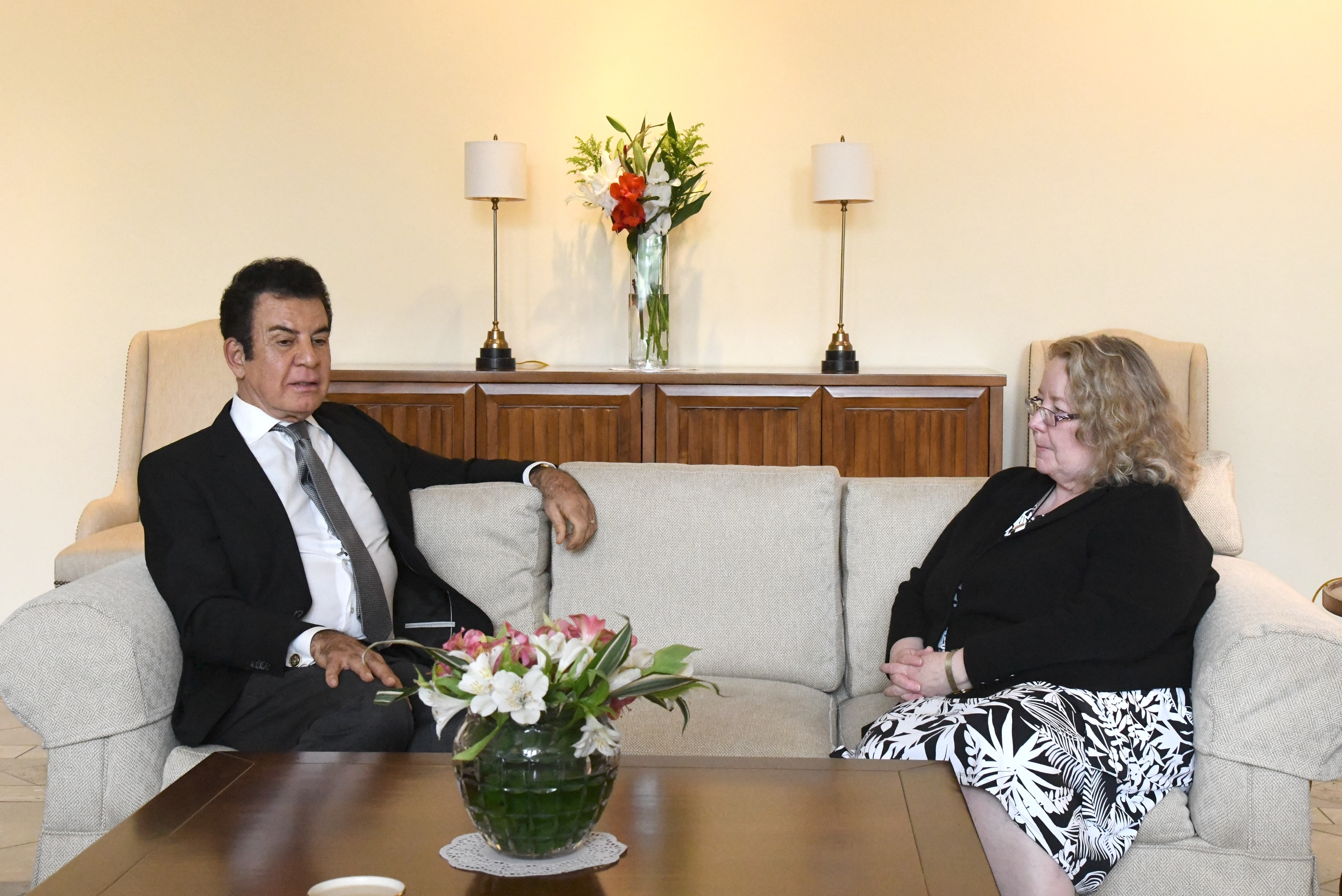
Nasralla with American Chargé d'Affaires Colleen Hoey in July 2025.

One condition of Nasralla ending his presidential campaign and endorsing Castro's was that if they gained a majority in Congress, the congressional president would be a member of the Savior Party. Castro’s Libre party won 50 seats, whilst Nasralla's Savior party won 10. When the newly elected congress voted for a congressional president on 21 January 2022, 18 deputies from Castro’s party refused to honour the agreement. They voted for Luis Cálix, a member of Libre, rather than Luis Redondo from Nasralla’s party as the Savior members and the rest of the Libre deputies had done. Nasralla commented on the incident as "another coup like in 2009". As a consequence, the 18 deputies were expelled from Libre. The dispute was resolved when Calíx and the expelled Libre deputies agreed to support Redondo. Their membership of Libre was restored when Libre's leader, former President Manuel Zelaya, reversed their expulsion.

=== 2025 presidential campaign ===
Nasralla resigned from the Vice Presidency in 2024, intending to run for President the following year. He secured the nomination of the Liberal Party in March 2025 after winning the party's primary. Nasralla observed a hearing held by the U.S. House Foreign Affairs Committee regarding the elections in November 2025.

On 3 December 2025, it was reported that Nasralla had widened his lead in the presidential election over his Donald Trump-backed rival Nasry Asfura. Asfura retook the lead, though the election results was still in contention. Asfura was ultimately elected president, defeating Nasralla by 40.3% to 39.5%. Nasralla rejected the results, arguing that there were still 10,000 ballot boxes left to be counted and that "a result should not have been declared without counting all the votes."

== Personal life ==
Nasralla is married to former beauty queen Iroshka Elvir. They have one daughter, born in December 2017.

Party political offices
New political party	Anti-Corruption Party nominee for President of Honduras; 2013	Succeeded by Julio López Casaca
Preceded by Xiomara Castro	Libre nominee for President of Honduras; 2017	Succeeded by Xiomara Castro
New political party	Leader of the Savior Party of Honduras; 2019–2024	Succeeded by Fátima Mena
New political party	Savior Party nominee for President of Honduras (withdrew); 2021	Succeeded by Alexander Mira
Preceded by Xiomara Castro	Libre nominee for First Vice President of Honduras; 2021	Succeeded by Eduardo Enrique Reina
Preceded by Yani Rosenthal	Liberal Party nominee for President of Honduras; 2025	Most recent
Political offices
Preceded by Ricardo Álvarez Arias	First Vice President of Honduras; 2022–2024; Served alongside: Doris Gutiérrez and Renato Florentino	Succeeded by Maria Antonieta Mejia
