= Nicaraguan fourth ballot box =

Political initiative by Nicaraguan president Daniel Ortega

The Nicaraguan fourth ballot box or Nicaraguan cuarta urna was a referendum or plebiscite proposed by Nicaraguan president Daniel Ortega as part of a project to pressure for and effect a change to Nicaraguan constitutional law regarding term limits imposed on the presidency. This follows in the wake of similar efforts by fellow Central American president Manuel Zelaya to propose a fourth ballot box in Honduras.

Ortega recently gained a victory towards defeating presidential term limits when the Nicaraguan Supreme Court decided a constitutional ban on re-election did not apply to him. Ortega was seeking to run again for the presidency in 2011. Nicaraguan lawmakers continued to oppose Ortega's re-election plans.

The Supreme Court of Justice of Nicaragua abolished term limits in Nicaragua in November 2009.
