= Honduran fourth ballot box referendum =

Political initiative of Honduran president Manuel Zelaya

The Honduran fourth ballot box referendum (Spanish: La cuarta urna) was a planned non-binding referendum by Honduran president Manuel Zelaya to gauge public opinion on a second, binding referendum aimed at convening a constitutional assembly. The referendum would have run concurrently with the November 2009 presidential, congressional, and mayoral elections (i.e. the first three ballot boxes). Some Hondurans opposed the plan, including many politicians from the two largest parties. When Zelaya pushed ahead with plans for this referendum (subsequently structured as a government-run 'poll') on whether to include a fourth ballot box (the second referendum), the Supreme Court issued a warrant for his arrest and the army expelled him from the country in a coup d'état on June 28, precipitating the 2009 Honduran constitutional crisis.

== Honduras and ALBA ==
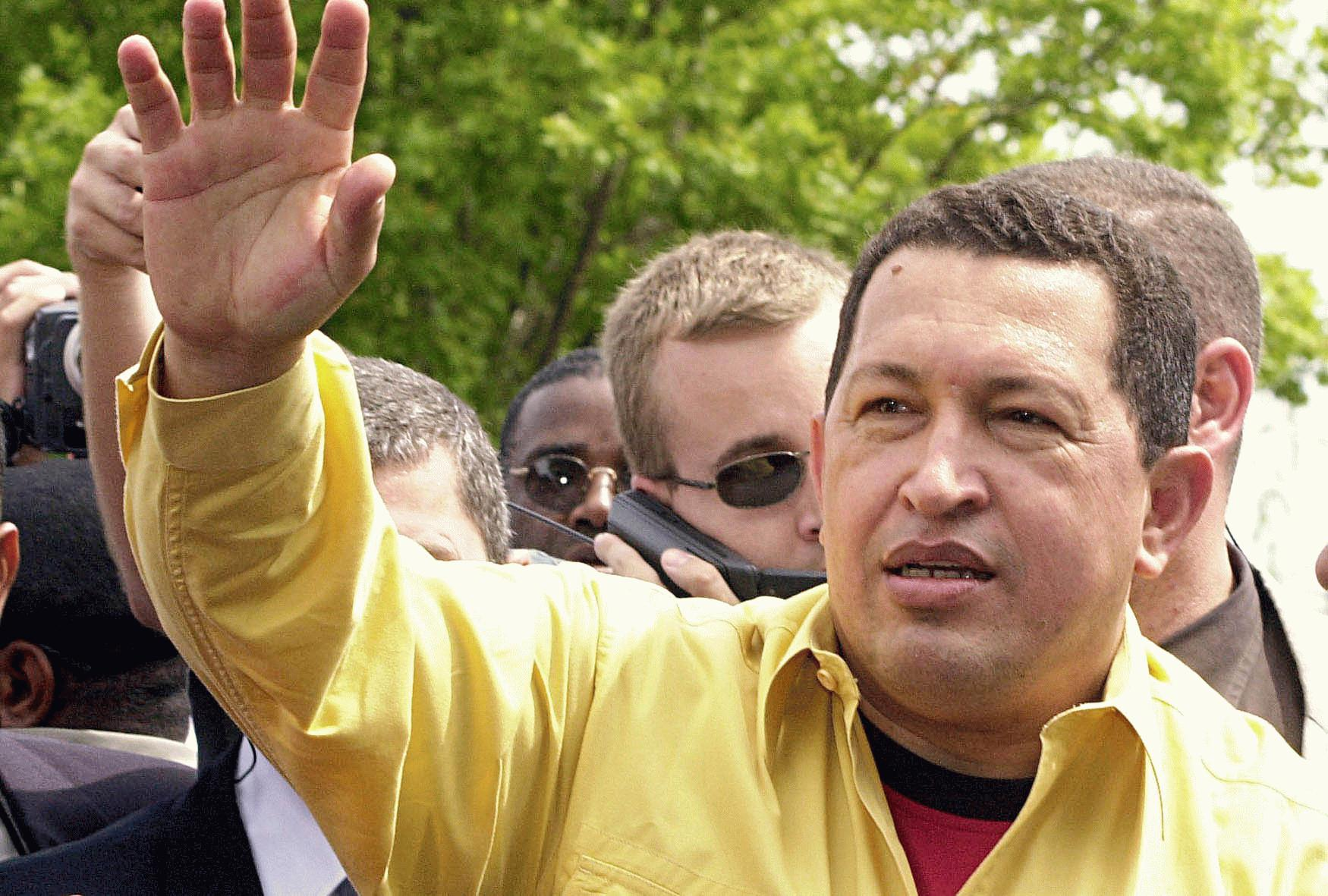
Hugo Chávez

On July 22, 2008, Zelaya had revealed that he was seeking to incorporate the country into the ALBA, an organization founded by Hugo Chávez. He said that the country had been "observer member" "four or more months". The Associated Press, citing Manuel Orozco of the Inter American Dialogue, said that "His [Zelaya's] campaign for changing the constitution has energized his support base of labour groups, farmers and civil organisations who have long felt marginalized in a country where a wealthy elite controls the media and much of politics."

Other leaders of ALBA have successfully sought to modify or even eliminate their term limits. "The constitution had since 1980 been tweaked in other areas around thirty times, to the point where politicians of all camps were convinced that the document was no longer adequate. This is where the formal change proposed by Manuel Zelaya comes in: that in the November 2009 election-round, the voters will be presented with four ballot-boxes - the fourth one being used for a referendum on the question: "Do you agree with convening a constituent assembly to draw up a new constitution?" Most members of the political class have been in agreement with the idea - but most too are unhappy with the man promoting it; in great part because lurking behind the fourth ballot-box they see... Hugo Chávez's shadow. The pre-coup political atmosphere revealed the fluidity surrounding the project of launching an independent candidate and the fourth ballot-box proposal. The establishment media owned by the country's elite were quick to connect them, and to try to see evidence of Hugo Chávez's influence." Newt Gingrich wrote in the Washington Examiner that Chavez had used ALBA to create "a tide of incipient dictatorship" flowing out of Venezuela into other countries in Latin America. He noted that Chavez has subverted democracy in Venezuela to ensure his rule would be uncontested for decades, and "one-by-one, each of the members of ALBA have followed Chavez's lead and changed their constitutions to remove limits on the number of terms their presidents can serve."

When Zelaya issued Executive Decree PCM-05-2009 on March 24, the situation was:

- Bolivia (Evo Morales) - Term limits modified in February 2009.
- Cuba (Raúl Castro) - De facto dictatorship.
- Ecuador (Rafael Correa) - Term limits modified in September 2008.
- Nicaragua (Daniel Ortega) - Modifications planned (Nicaraguan fourth ballot box).
- Venezuela (Hugo Chávez) - Term limits modified in February 2009, allowing indefinite re-election (after a failed attempt in 2007).

Daniel Ortega succeeded in modifying term limits in Nicaragua in November 2009.

== Emergency executive decree ==
On September 30, 2008 Zelaya issued emergency executive decree 46-A-2208, which authorized 30 million lempiras of public money to advertise Zelaya's fourth ballot box. Soon after he issued another emergency executive decree, identical except that the money was transferred to his office. Auditors later found documentation of 29 checks and a total of 29,995,887.62 lempiras. The expenses weren't well documented. It is unclear whether another 30 million was withdrawn. The supposed advertisers paid no sales tax. The Supreme Audit Court's investigation raised concerns that 30-60 million was squandered with the two executive decrees.

== Constitutional assembly plans ==
Zelaya's leftward drift during his presidency (which included raising the minimum wage by 60%) culminated in a plan to hold a Constitutional Assembly to write a new constitution. A publicity document produced for the fourth ballot box initiative that outlined the goals of a constitutional convention was inserted in an Armed Forces timeline document. Some of the topics of a constitutional convention include social order; the establishment of a recall mechanism for politicians; actual freedom of the press through equitable access; economic liberty with social responsibility; authentic political liberty resulting in a representative democracy where politicians are responsible to their electorate instead of their party; more consultation of the populace; and other suggested topics. Notably absent in the flyer was any mention of extending the term of the president. Zelaya was quoted by popular media outlets as saying "[t]he only one who can't be re-elected is the President, but re-election is a topic of the next National Constitutional Assembly". For minorities like the 400,000 ethnic Garifunas it held the promise of winning long-sought rights, such as proportional representation and legal title to communal and ancestral land. The Foreign Policy magazine's coverage stated there was nothing ideological about Zelaya's plan, noting that he never bothered to explain what kind of constitution he wanted, other than one that allowed his own reelection. The article concluded "In that respect, Zelaya is less a disciple of Chávez than of Nicaraguan President Daniel Ortega, another unsavory character bereft of any ideal other than staying in power by hook or by crook."

The current Political Constitution of the Republic of Honduras was initially approved on 11 January 1982, three years after Honduras returned to civilian rule after many decades of mostly military governments. The provision of the constitution, at issue here, was written to prevent a president from extending his rule beyond one term to prevent another dictatorship. The National Congress of Honduras amended the Constitution 26 times from 1984 to 2005 and made 10 interpretations of the Constitution from 1982 to 2005.

== Referendum on constitutional assembly ==
As early as August 2006, Central America report stated that "liberal sectors" were proposing to reform " 'obsolete articles' " in the constitution, including one against presidential reelection. The report said that this was causing controversy. Debate regarding the convening of a constituent assembly took place in Honduras, with support from many groups.

On 11 November 2008, President Zelaya announced a non-binding referendum to see if the people wanted to have a fourth ballot box, "Cuarta Urna", installed at polling places during the next election, which is scheduled for 29 November 2009. The fourth ballot, which would be in addition to the usual ones for presidential, congressional and local elections, would ask voters whether they wanted to hold a National Constituent Assembly to draft a new constitution. Zelaya, whose presidential term was to expire on 27 January 2010, would be ineligible, under the term-limitations of the present constitution, to run in the 2009 election. Zelaya pointed out on at least one occasion (26 June) that since the electorate's decision whether to convoke a constituent assembly would not be made until 29 November 2009 – simultaneously with the presidential election – any constitutional changes that might result would be too late to allow him to run for reelection. Others have also observed that the 29 November date set for the Constitutional Assembly poll is too late to facilitate Zelaya's continuation in office.

On February 17, at a public showcasing of tractor equipment received from Venezuela, Manuel Zelaya states that he will propose a fourth ballot box.

On 24 March 2009, Zelaya called for a preliminary poll to be held on 28 June 2009 to gauge popular support for the idea of including the Constituent Assembly question in the November 2009 election. In May he issued executive decree PCM-05-2009 for the National Statistical Institute to hold the poll by 28 June 2009. The question to be asked in this preliminary poll was:

Do you agree that in the general elections of November 2009 there be included a fourth ballot in which the people decide whether to convoke a National Constituent Assembly?

Early coverage of the constitutional crisis often repeated that Zelaya wanted to call a constitutional convention because he sought either to continue in office as President, or sought a chance to seek re-election to President at some future point. Such reports echo the claims of three of the four daily newspapers in Honduras, which originated these claims. An example of this type of coverage is the German newspaper, Die Welt, which wrote "Opponents of Zelaya believe he was pushing the limits of democracy with his drive to extend the single four-year term of presidents to allow re-election." As noted above, Zelaya pointed out on at least one occasion (26 June) that since the electorate's decision whether to convoke a constituent assembly would not be made until 29 November 2009 – simultaneously with the presidential election – any constitutional changes that might eventually result would be too late to allow him to run for reelection.

== Courts declare the referendum illegal ==
The Article 5 of the constitution states that only the Supreme Electoral Tribunal can schedule, organize and supervise referendums and plebiscites.

The President of the Congress, Micheletti, observed that article 374 of the constitution states that no referendum can be used to alter the entrenched articles in the constitution that are specified in article 384.

Article 373 of the constitution states that the constitution can be modified by a two-thirds majority of the National Congress. Article 374, however, specifies that several articles are entrenched; that is, they cannot be modified under any circumstances (Spanish: "en ningún caso"). The entrenched clauses include those on the system of government that is permitted, and the presidential succession. Article 239 specifically prohibits the president from attempting to amend restrictions on succession, and states that whoever does so will cease "immediately" in his or her functions. Zelaya's statement--"[t]he only one who can't be re-elected is the President, but re-election is a topic of the next National Constitutional Assembly"—is a declaration that some have argued violates Article 239. However, any charges brought under Article 239 require the observance of due process rights, such as those afforded by Article 94 of the Honduran Constitution. Article 239 was not mentioned as a basis for the charges discussed in the subsequent judicial case file against Zelaya.

On 25 March, the Attorney General's office formally notified President Zelaya that he would face criminal charges of abusing power if he proceeded with the referendum.

In late May the court of contentious administration ruled the poll illegal. Honduras’ Supreme Electoral Tribunal also ruled that such a poll would be illegal. On 27 May, Micheletti announced that he had submitted evidence to the public prosecutor that the Executive branch had put out a contract to have him killed. He said that for more than a month he'd been followed and menaced with death and placed responsibility on the executive branch. Zelaya responded that "whoever made these claims had swine flu and was delirious." The lower court decision was upheld by the Supreme Court. In late June the intended consultative poll was also rejected by Congress.

On June 3, Congress passes a resolution warning Zelaya to correct his administrative conduct.

On June 11, the Bar Association of Honduras unanimously agreed that Zelaya's is violating the law. It asked Zelaya to stop the illegalities and recommended officials not follow his illegal orders.

On 23 June 2009, Congress passed a law forbidding holding polls, referendums, and plebiscites less than 180 days before the next general election; as the next elections are set for 29 November 2009 this would have made the 28 June 2009 poll illegal. Since this bill was passed after the poll was scheduled, Zelaya rejected its applicability to this case.

== Zelaya violates court orders ==
The military is in charge of security and logistics in elections in Honduras. Zelaya asked them to perform their election role for the poll, but the head of the military command, General Romeo Vásquez Velásquez, refused the order to pass out the poll materials, brought from Venezuela, because the Supreme Court had ruled the poll to be illegal. On 24 June Zelaya fired him. Later that day, the defense minister and the heads of the army, navy and air force resigned. On 25 June the Supreme Court ruled 5-0 that General Velásquez was to be reinstated. Tribunal member David Matamoros affirmed the Electoral Tribunal’s support for the military's actions.

On June 25, just days before his illegal survey, Zelaya published executive decree PCM-019-2009, which revoked the earlier decree PCM-05-2009. Zelaya issued a new executive decree, PCM-020-2009. On the afternoon of June 25, Zelaya led several hundred people to the Hernan Acosta Mejia air force base and took possession of the disputed poll ballots, which he then kept in the presidential palace to avoid their destruction.

Congress began discussing how to impeach Zelaya and opened an investigation into whether Zelaya had violated the constitution and also whether he was "mentally incapable" of holding office. Zelaya responded to the President of the National Congress Roberto Micheletti by saying "What's with you, Roberto. I was elected by the people, not the congress. How would you make me ineligible, you're a lousy second-rate congressman who got your post because I gave you space in my party."

On 23 June, tens of thousands of people marched in San Pedro Sula against Zelaya's alleged re-election plans. On 27 June, thousands of protesters opposed to Zelaya marched through Tegucigalpa. itte On 26 June the Venezuelan government propaganda outlet Telesur reported that Micheletti had written a letter, on National Congress letterheading, to General Romeo Vásquez Velásquez saying "respectfully I am writing you to greet you and to remind you of the mission to be undertaken on 28 June; that already the institution that you lead has been called to defend our CONSTITUTION and country and every one of Hondurans thanks you." Micheletti continued, "These people who say they are Hondurans and wish to change our constitution don't deserve to be in our country, violating our constitution and selling our country."

The Supreme Court, Congress, and the military recommended that voters stay home because the poll would be neither fair nor safe to voters. The National Human Rights Commissioner, Ramón Custodio, said "I would tell the people to stay calmly at home in order not to get involved in any incident or any violence by going to vote 'no,' because they might be assaulted by these mobs," referring to Zelaya's supporters, who also were going to handle poll materials and count ballots.

International leaders, such as U.S. Senator John Kerry, chairman of the Senate Foreign Relations Committee, expressed concern about the growing tension in Honduras over the referendum vote. UN chief Ban Ki-moon urged "restraint by all concerned" amid rising political unrest in the country and expressed concern about the tensions.
