= Liberty and Refoundation =

Liberty and Refoundation Libertad y Refundación
- Abbreviation: Libre
- Leader: Manuel Zelaya
- General Secretary: Juan Alberto Barahona Mejía
- Founded: 26 June 2011; 15 years ago
- Split from: Liberal Party of Honduras
- Headquarters: Tegucigalpa
- Ideology: Democratic socialism; Progressivism; Anti-capitalism; Anti-imperialism
- Political position: Left-wing; Factions: Centre-left to far-left
- Regional affiliation: São Paulo Forum
- International affiliation: Progressive International
- Colours: Red and black
- National Congress: 35 / 128

Party flag

Website
- www.libre.hn

Liberty and Refoundation (Spanish: Libertad y Refundación), also known as Libre (lit. 'Free'), is a left-wing political party in Honduras. Libre was founded in 2011 by the National Popular Resistance Front (FNRP), a leftist coalition of organizations opposed to the 2009 coup against Manuel Zelaya. The party has been led since its foundation by Zelaya and his wife Xiomara Castro who served as the president of Honduras from early 2022 to early 2026.

== History ==
Xiomara Castro, the wife of former president Manuel Zelaya, who was deposed in the 2009 coup, was the presidential candidate of the party in the 2013 presidential election; Zelaya was not allowed to run for a second term under the constitution. Castro took second place in the four-way race, receiving approximately 29 percent of the vote behind Juan Orlando Hernández's 34 percent.

At least eighteen Libre pre-candidates, candidates, family members, and campaign leaders were killed between June 2012 and October 2013. Additionally, it is strongly opposed to free market capitalism and the neo-liberal economic model, and maintains a long-term goal of "establishing an alternative economic system."

On 28 November 2021, Castro, presidential candidate of Liberty and Refoundation, won 53% of the votes in the presidential election to become the first female president of Honduras. Castro stated during the campaign that she would promote democratic socialism and ask the National Congress to draft a new constitution. It also won 50 seats in the National Congress.

In the 2025 Honduran general election, the party lost the presidency under candidate Rixi Moncada, placing third. It also placed third in the National Congress.

== Factions ==
There are at least seven factions within Liberty and Refoundation.

- 28 June Movement (Movimiento 28 de junio)/ M28 since 2017
- People's Resistance Movement (Movimiento Resistencia Popular, MRP) /Renewal and New Alternatives Movement (Movimiento Renovación Nuevas Alternativas, MORENA) since 2025
- Organized People in Resistance (Pueblo Organizado en Resistencia, POR)
- People's Refoundation Force (Fuerza de Refundación Popular, FRP)
- 5 July Movement (Movimiento 5 de julio)
- We are + (Somos+)
- New Movemment (Nueva Corriente)

== List of political leaders ==
No.	Image	Name (Birth-Death)	Term in office			Elections	Note
No.	Image	Name (Birth-Death)	Start term	End term	Time in office	Elections	Note
1		Manuel Zelaya (born 1952)	26 June 2011	Incumbent	15 years, 115 days	2013 General Election; Candidate : Xiomara Castro 896,498 / 3,115,448	
1		Manuel Zelaya (born 1952)	26 June 2011	Incumbent	15 years, 115 days	2017 General Election; Candidate : Salvador Nasralla 1,360,442 / 3,284,704	
1		Manuel Zelaya (born 1952)	26 June 2011	Incumbent	15 years, 115 days	2021 General Election; Candidate : Xiomara Castro 1,716,793 / 3,358,053	
1		Manuel Zelaya (born 1952)	26 June 2011	Incumbent	15 years, 115 days	2025 General election Candidate : Rixi Moncada 706,222 / 3,679,190	

== Electoral history ==
=== Presidential elections ===
Election	Party candidate	Votes	%	Result
2013	Xiomara Castro	896,498	28.78%	Lost ✗
2017	Salvador Nasralla (with PINU)	1,360,442	41.42%	Lost ✗
2021	Xiomara Castro	1,716,793	51.12%	Elected ✓
2025	Rixi Moncada	706,222	19.19%	Lost ✗

=== National Congress ===
Election	Party leader	Votes marked	%	Seats	+/–	Position	Government
2013	Manuel Zelaya	7,568,392	27.51%	37 / 128	▲37	▲2nd	Opposition
2017	Manuel Zelaya	6,896,458	-	30 / 128	▼7	▲2nd	Opposition
2021	Manuel Zelaya	12,758,080	40.22%	50 / 128	▲20	▲1st	Government
2025	Manuel Zelaya	4,912,816	24.29%	35 / 128	▼15	▼3rd	Opposition

== See also ==
- Democratic Unification Party
- Innovation and Unity Party
- Pink tide
