= David Matamoros Batson =

Honduran politician

- Born: July 17, 1956 (age 69); Washington, D.C., United States
- Occupations: Lawyer and politician

David Andres Matamoros Batson (born 17 July 1956) is a Honduran lawyer and politician. He was a Magistrate and the President of the Supreme Electoral Tribunal of Honduras from 2010-2011 and again from 2013-2014.

He was also deputy of the National Congress of Honduras representing the National Party of Honduras for Francisco Morazán during the 1994–98 and 2006–10 periods, also was General Secretary of the National Party (2002-2004) and President of the National Telecommunications Commission (2004-2005).

In 2009, he was appointed a magistrate of the Supreme Electoral Tribunal and served as its president during the 2010-11 period and again during the 2013-14 period.
