= Yadira Bendaña =

Honduran journalist and politician

Yadira Esperanza Bendaña Flores (born 20 November 1968, in Tegucigalpa) is a Honduran journalist and politician. She currently serves as deputy of the National Congress of Honduras representing the Liberal Party of Honduras for Francisco Morazán.

She is well known in her country for being the host of the annual Teletón for six years; she left Televicentro due to labour disputes. In 2009, in the aftermath of the 2009 coup d'etat she was assaulted by an unknown man who called her a "golpista".
