= Universidad Tecnológica de Honduras =

Private university in Honduras

Coordinates: 15.5513°N 88.0128°W

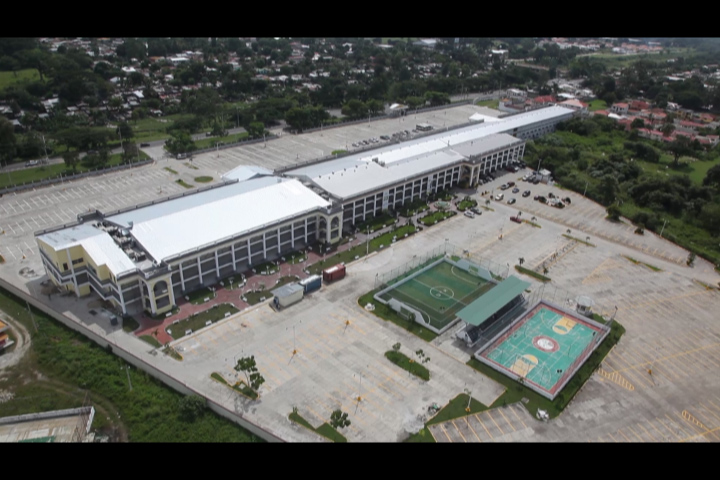

Universidad Tecnológica de Honduras (Technological University of Honduras) known by its acronym UTH, is a private university located in Honduras. It is known for its careers in Business Management, Law, Marketing and Tourism, and several engineering careers such as Industrial Production engineering, Computer Engineering and Electronics.

The university was born in the city of San Pedro Sula, where the main campus was established. This campus is the largest and has the greatest population of students. Additionally, it has seven campuses located in different cities of Honduras including in La Ceiba, El Progreso, Puerto Cortés, Tegucigalpa, Santa Barbara, Siguatepeque and Roatan.
