= Broad Front (Honduras) =

Broad Political Electoral Front in Resistance Frente Amplio Político Electoral en Resistencia
- Founded: 10 November 2010
- Registered: 8 May 2012
- Dissolved: 3 March 2025
- Headquarters: Tegucigalpa, Honduras
- Ideology: Communalism; Participatory socialism Municipal socialism
- Political position: Far-left
- Colors: Black, red, yellow

Party flag

The Broad Front, officially the Broad Political Electoral Front in Resistance (Spanish: Frente Amplio Político Electoral en Resistencia, FAPER) and sometimes known by the abbreviation EL FRENTE, was a political party in Honduras. It was recognized by the Supreme Electoral Tribunal on 8 May 2012. Its presidential candidate in the 2013 elections was Andrés Pavón.

The party was disestablished on 13 May 2014, due to the poor results in the elections. It was re-established in 2016.
