= Romeo Vásquez Velásquez =

Honduran general

Brigadier General Romeo Vásquez Velásquez
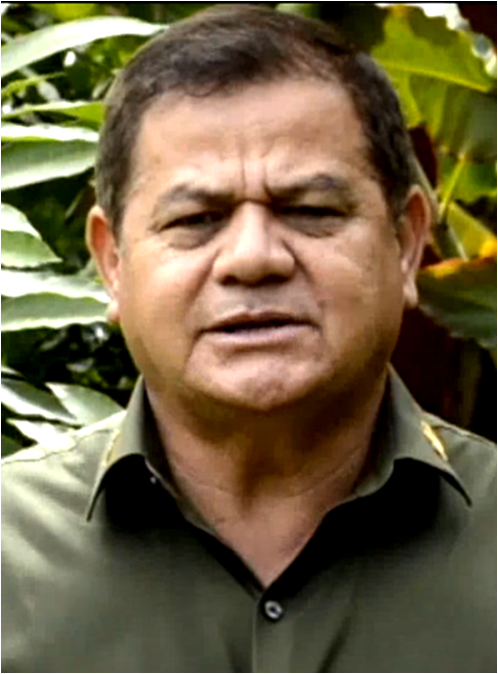

Commander of the Honduran Armed Forces
- In office January 11, 2005 – June 25, 2009
- President: Manuel Zelaya
- Succeeded by: Carlos Antonio Cuéllar

Personal details
- Born: Romeo Orlando Vásquez Velásquez; January 20, 1957 (age 69) Siguatepeque, Honduras
- Party: Honduran Patriotic Alliance
- Spouse: Licida Zelaya Lobo
- Children: 8
- Education: School of the Americas
- Occupation: Politician, military officer

Military service
- Allegiance: Honduras
- Branch/service: Honduran Army
- Years of service: 1972–2009
- Rank: Brigadier General

Romeo Orlando Vásquez Velásquez (born 20 January 1957) is a Honduran politician and retired brigadier general. He was the head of the military of Honduras from January 11, 2005 to June 25, 2009.

== Early life ==
He was born in Siguatepeque, Comayagua Department. In 1972, he joined the army, and he attended the School of the Americas (SOA/WHINSEC) at least twice, in 1976 and 1984.

He has a degree in economy and finances. He is married to Licida Zelaya Lobo, from Olancho, and they have two children. He also has six other ones.

== 2009 Honduran constitutional crisis ==
He was sacked by President Manuel Zelaya on June 25, 2009, for refusing to allow the armed forces to help in conducting a Honduran fourth ballot box referendum proposed by President Zelaya. Vásquez stated that he had refused to help with the vote aimed at removing the constitutional one-term limit because the Honduras Supreme Court had ruled the vote illegal. Zelaya denied the referendum was intended to extend term limits but claimed that it was to ask the people if they wanted to add the question of a constitutional assembly to the November ballot. Later the same day, however, all five judges of the Supreme Court acted in favor of a ruling chief of staff, restoring him to office after they declared his removal unconstitutional. The resolution cited Article 40 of the Constitutive Act of the Armed Forces, Decree 39-2001: "The head of the Joint Chiefs will run for three years in office and only be removed by resignation, incapacity absolute disqualification from office for final decision and loss or suspension of citizenship decreed by competent authority in accordance with the law and by the end of his time on active duty in the armed forces. The military forcibly exiled Zelaya on June 28, 2009, precipitating the 2009 Honduran coup d'état. The Attorney General charged the military leadership for this act, but the Supreme Court dismissed all charges.

== Political career ==
On March 9, 2010, President Porfirio Lobo Sosa appointed Vásquez Velásquez as head of the state-owned telecom company Hondutel.

Vásquez Velásquez ran for president of Honduras in the 2013 Honduran general election, and again in 2017, for the Honduran Patriotic Alliance, formed in 2011.

Military offices
Preceded by ???	Head of the Armed Forces of Honduras; 2005–2010	Succeeded by Carlos Antonio Cuéllar

Political offices
Preceded by Jorge Aguilar (Acting)	Manager of Hondutel; 2010–present	Incumbent
