= Honduran Patriotic Alliance =

Honduran Patriotic Alliance Alianza Patriótica Hondureña
- Leader: Romeo Vásquez Velásquez
- Founded: 25 March 2012
- Headquarters: Tegucigalpa
- Ideology: Conservatism
- Political position: Centre-right
- National Congress: 0 / 128

Party flag

Website
- http://alianzapatriotica.hn/

The Honduran Patriotic Alliance (Spanish: Alianza Patriótica Hondureña) is a centre-right political party in Honduras. Romeo Vásquez Velásquez was the party's candidate in the 2013 Honduran general election.
