= 2013 Honduran general election =

Election

- 24 November 2013
- Presidential election
- Registered: 5,308,781
- Turnout: 59.14% (▲9.26pp)
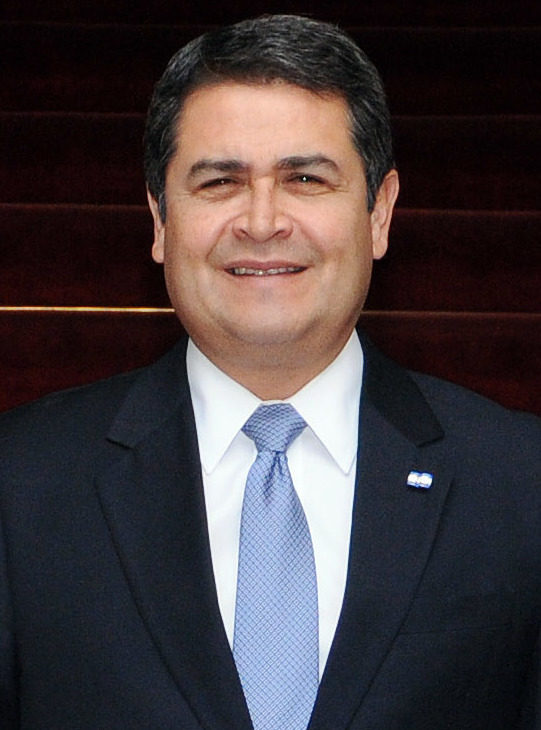

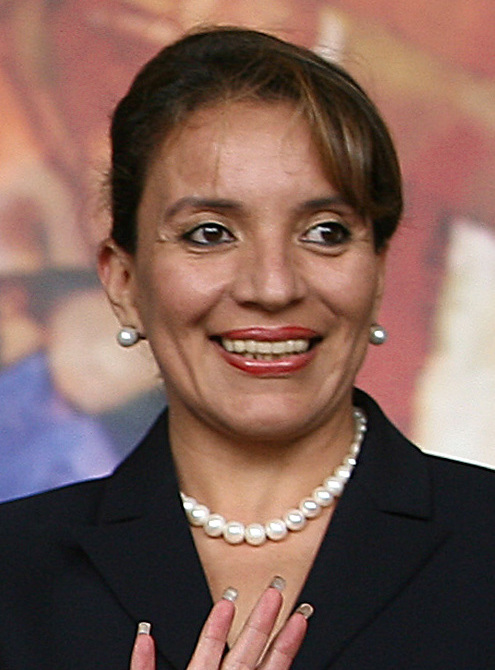

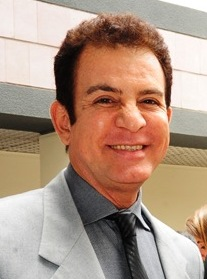
Nominee	Juan Orlando Hernández	Xiomara Castro
Party	National	Libre
Popular vote	1,149,302	896,498
Percentage	36.89%	28.78%
Nominee	Mauricio Villeda	Salvador Nasralla
Party	Liberal	Anti-Corruption
Popular vote	632,320	418,443
Percentage	20.30%	13.43%
- Hernández: <30% 30-40% 40–50% 50–60% 60–70% 70–80% 80–90% Castro: 30-40% 40-50% 50–60% Villeda: <30% 30-40% 40–50% 50–60% 60–70% Nasralla: <30% 30-40% 40–50%
President before election
Porfirio Lobo Sosa
National
Elected President
Juan Orlando Hernández
National
- Parliamentary election
- All 128 seats in the National Congress; 65 seats needed for a majority
Party	Leader	Vote %	Seats	+/–
National	Porfirio Lobo Sosa	33.64	48	−23
Libre	Manuel Zelaya	27.51	37	New
Liberal	Mauricio Villeda	16.97	27	−18
PAC	Salvador Nasralla	15.15	13	New
PINU	Jorge Aguilar Paredes	1.84	1	−2
UD	Matías Funes	1.67	1	−3
CD	Lucas Evangelisto Aguilera Pineda	1.62	1	−4
This lists parties that won seats. See the complete results below.
Results of the congressional election
President of the Congress before	President of the Congress after
Juan Orlando Hernández; National	Mauricio Oliva; National

General elections were held in Honduras on 24 November 2013. Voters went to the polls to elect a new President, the 128 members of the National Congress, 298 Mayors and vice-mayors and their respective councilors and 20 representatives to the Central American Parliament.

The closely watched presidential election saw a field of eight candidates vying to succeed outgoing President Porfirio Lobo Sosa, who is not eligible to run for re-election. Salvador Nasralla, a sports journalist and television personality, and Xiomara Castro, the wife of the deposed president Mel Zelaya, both candidates from newly formed political parties (the Anti-Corruption Party and Libre, respectively) were leading in most of the early polls. However, as the election neared, the candidates of the two traditional parties – Juan Orlando Hernández of the National Party and Mauricio Villeda of the Liberal Party – both surged in the polls.

The elections were the first since 1954 in which a party other than the National Party and Liberal Party received over 7% of the vote and more than five seats in the legislature in a general election. It was also the first time the Liberal Party did not finish either first or second in an election since the 1920s.

== Background ==
This is the first election to be contested by the opposition since the controversial and polarising 2009 Honduran coup d'état. The social mobilization since then led to the founding of the main opposition party, Libre.

=== Two-party system ===
Honduras has historically been dominated by a two-party system – the National Party and the Liberal Party. This election represents the first time in Honduran history in which other parties had a chance at winning the presidency or at least gaining a significant representation in the Congress, four of which find their genesis post-coup.

=== Human rights concerns ===
The elections took place amidst a deteriorating human rights situations. Amnesty International called attention to the killings of human rights defenders in the lead-up to the election, noting that Honduras had the highest homicide rate in the world yet only twenty percent of homicides were investigated. Honduran human rights organizations formed the Board of Analysis on the Human Rights Situation to monitor human rights violations surrounding the election, pointing to the level of political violence in the country: human rights group Rights Action examined the period between May 2012 and October 2013 and documented 36 killings and 24 armed attacks against pre-candidates, candidates, their families and campaign leaders across all parties, with Libre experiencing the majority of both armed attacks and killings. In light of this situation, 24 U.S. Senators signed a letter to the U.S. State Department expressing their concerns about the upcoming elections.

== Campaign ==
Key electoral issues have been citizen security, organized crime, unemployment, and corruption. One of the main components of Hernández's campaign is his promise to put "a soldier on every corner." For her part, Castro has emphasized the need for community policing and secure borders.

== Presidential candidates ==
Candidate	Running mates	Party
Juan Orlando Hernández	1. Ricardo Álvarez Arias; 2. Ava Rossana Guevara; 3. Lorena Enriqueta Herrera Estévez	National Party
Xiomara Castro	1. Juan Alberto Barahona Mejía; 2. Juliette Handal; 3. Eduardo Enrique Reina García	Liberty and Refoundation
Mauricio Villeda	1. María Cristina González Romero; 2. José Martín Chicas Munguía; 3. Lía Argentina Bueso Chinchilla	Liberal Party
Salvador Nasralla	1. Soraya Asunción Salabarrieta; 2. Selene Suyara Sánchez Sierra; 3. Ricardo Emigdio Mena	Anti-Corruption Party
Romeo Vásquez Velásquez	1. Nadia Kafaty Geadah; 2. Amílcar Santamaría; 3. Graciamaría Agüero Guevara	Patriotic Alliance
Orle Solís	1. Gessy Yolany Torres Rodríguez; 2. Gertrúdiz Ramos Escobar; 3. Luis Fernando Zúniga Cuesta	Christian Democratic Party
Jorge Aguilar Paredes	1. Sonia Matilde Fiallos; 2. Guillermo Enrique Valle; 3. Myrna Maritza Castellanos	Innovation and Unity Party
Andrés Pavón	1. Lourdes Marlen Cruz; 2. Adolfo Cruz Ruiz; 3. Mirian Rosaura Jácome Mejía	FAPER–Democratic Unification

=== Primaries ===
Primaries were held for the National Party, Liberal Party and Libre.

==== National ====
Juan Orlando Hernández, president of the National Congress of Honduras, won the presidential nomination of the National Party. The other candidates were Ricardo Álvarez (the Mayor of Tegucigalpa), Fernando Anduray (National Congress deputy), Victor Hugo Barnica (Third Vice President of Honduras), Eva Fernandez, Loreley Fernandez, and Miguel Pastor (Secretary of State for Public Works, Transport, and Housing). The Supreme Electoral Tribunal certified Hernández's victory, but Álvarez immediately presented an appeal, accusing Hernández of fraud and asking for a recount. The appeal was rejected by the Constitutional Chamber of the Supreme Court, four of whose five members were replaced by Hernández a month earlier in a move widely criticized as an illegal "technical coup". Álvarez and Pastor refused to attend the party convention in protest, claiming that they were being persecuted by their own party.

==== Liberal ====
Mauricio Villeda, won the presidential nomination of the Liberal Party. Other candidates in the fray for the presidential nomination were Esteban Handal Perez and Yani Rosenthal (National Congress deputy and former Minister of Presidency).

==== Libre ====
Xiomara Castro de Zelaya, former First Lady of Honduras, was the sole presidential candidate in the Libre primaries.

== Opinion polls ==
=== President ===
Pollster	Date	Sample size	Hernández	Castro	Villeda	Nasralla	Other	Undecided/ abstention
Cid/Gallup	6–12 September 2013	1,220	27%	29%	15%	11%	—	—
Paradigma	16–24 September 2013	2,400	21.9%	22.8%	12.0%	10.0%	1%	34.3%
Cid/Gallup	9–15 October 2013	1,525	28%	27%	17%	9%	—	—
Paradigma	10–19 October 2013	4,025	25.7%	22.2%	10.7%	9.9%	0.7%	30.8%

=== Congress ===
Pollster	Date	Sample	PN	Libre	PL	PAC	Other party	None/Independents/No answer
Cid/Gallup	6–12 September 2013	1,220	32%	22%	21%	8%	17%	
Paradigma	16–24 September 2013	2,400	28.7%	20.6%	19.1%	3.7%	0.9%	27.0%
TecniMerk	28 September – 5 October 2013	2,500	28.5%	28.2%	14.8%	9.6%		
Cid/Gallup	9–15 October 2013	1,525	35%	19%	22%	6%	18%	
Paradigma	10–19 October 2013	4,025	30.0%	20.0%	18.0%	3.2%	0.5%	28.3%

== Conduct ==
Honduran elections have historically been marred by fraud, and polls leading up to the elections found that 59% of Hondurans believe the elections would be fraudulent. However, the Supreme Electoral Tribunal (TSE) has stated that these would be the most clean and fair elections in Honduras's history, and both the traditionally dominant parties – the National and Liberal parties – agree. The newly formed Libre Party and Anti-Corruption Party fear that there would be fraud, a position backed by the Carter Center. Anti-Corruption Party candidate Salvador Nasralla publicly denounced attempts at vote-buying by the National Party across the country. Nasralla highlighted National Party control of key government institutions like the Public Ministry and the Supreme Court. Dana Frank, writing in The Nation, echoed these concerns, noting National Party candidate Hernández's participation in both the illegal naming of a new attorney general in August 2013 and the illegal destitution of four Supreme Court judges in December 2012, the latter of which ultimately resulted in Hernández securing his party's nomination for the presidency.

The TSE has stated that over 700 international election observers, representing various governments and organizations, including the United Nations, the Organization of American States, the European Union, and the Carter Center, will be present to monitor the elections. In the days before the election, international observers in the department of Yoro and in the capital Tegucigalpa reported targeted harassment and intimidation on the part of immigration officials and unidentified armed men. The TSE confirmed these reports and ordered the Honduran immigration authorities to stop all of these types of operations concerning election observers.

== Results ==
=== President ===
Candidate	Running mate	Party	Votes	%
Juan Orlando Hernández	Ricardo Álvarez Arias	National Party	1,149,302	36.89
Xiomara Castro	Juan Alberto Barahona Mejía	Liberty and Refoundation	896,498	28.78
Mauricio Villeda	María Cristina González Romero	Liberal Party of Honduras	632,320	20.30
Salvador Nasralla	Soraya Asunción Salabarrieta	Anti-Corruption Party	418,443	13.43
Romeo Vásquez Velásquez	Nadia Kafaty Geadah	Patriotic Alliance	6,105	0.20
Orle Solís	Gessy Yolany Torres Rodríguez	Christian Democratic Party	5,194	0.17
Jorge Aguilar Paredes	Sonia Matilde Fiallos	Innovation and Unity Party	4,468	0.14
Andrés Pavón	Lourdes Marlen Cruz	FAPER–Democratic Unification	3,118	0.10
Total			3,115,448	100.00
Valid votes			3,115,448	95.12
Invalid/blank votes			159,898	4.88
Total votes			3,275,346	100.00
Registered voters/turnout			5,355,112	61.16
Source: TSE

=== National Congress ===
Party	Votes	%	Seats	+/–
National Party	9,255,904	33.64	48	–23
Liberty and Refoundation	7,568,392	27.51	37	New
Liberal Party	4,670,157	16.97	27	–18
Anti-Corruption Party	4,169,245	15.15	13	New
Innovation and Unity Party	506,321	1.84	1	–2
Democratic Unification Party	460,814	1.67	1	–3
Christian Democratic Party	444,734	1.62	1	–4
Honduran Patriotic Alliance	272,347	0.99	0	New
FAPER–Democratic Unification	128,488	0.47	0	–
Independent Socialist candidates	20,429	0.07	0	–
FAPER	9,011	0.03	0	New
United for Choluteca	8,542	0.03	0	–
Total	27,514,384	100.00	128	0
Valid votes	2,699,544	85.98		
Invalid/blank votes	440,146	14.02		
Total votes	3,139,690	100.00		
Registered voters/turnout	5,308,781	59.14		
Source: Election Passport, IPU

== Aftermath ==
Juan Orlando Hernández was announced as the winner in a result the Supreme Electoral Tribunal's head, David Matamoros, called "irreversible", this followed initial claims by both leading candidates of having won. While opposition protests continued, Hernández said the result was "not negotiable with anybody" and named a transition team.

However, Castro and Nasralla disputed the results. Castro called on her supporters to hold a protest on Saturday 30 November.

According to the North American Congress on Latin America, the elections were "fraught with irregularities and violent intimidation, threatening to throw the embattled nation into further political disarray." However, observers from the Organization of American States and the United Nations declared that the elections met international standards and were both free and fair.

== See also ==
- Parliamentary candidates in the 2013 Honduran general election
