= Anti-Corruption Party =

Anticorruption Party Partido Anticorrupción de Honduras
- President: Marlene Alvarenga
- Founder: Salvador Nasralla
- Founded: 17 March 2012
- Headquarters: Tegucigalpa
- Ideology: Anticorruption
- Political position: Centre
- National Congress: 1 / 128

The Anticorruption Party (Spanish: Partido Anticorrupción de Honduras, PAC) is a political party in Honduras. It was founded by sports journalist/television presenter Salvador Nasralla, who ran unsuccessfully in the 2013 Honduran presidential election. As of 2022, the party holds one seat in the national legislature and is currently led by Marlene Alvarenga.
