= List of members of the National Congress of Honduras, 2010–2014 =

This is a list of the 128 deputies of the National Congress of Honduras elected in the 2009 general elections.

== National Party of Honduras ==
Name	Department
Juan Orlando Hernández; President (2010–13)	Lempira
Celín Discua	El Paraíso
Juan Fernando Lobo	Francisco Morazán
Juan Francisco Argeñal	Choluteca
Daniel Flores Velásquez	Atlántida
Julio César Gámez Interiano	Copán
Donaldo Ernesto Reyes	Santa Bárbara
Juan Carlos Molina Prieto	Yoro
Juan Carlos Valenzuela	Lempira
Lorena Enriqueta Herrera	Cortés
María Teresa Chávez	El Paraíso
Mario Alexander Barahona Martínez	Francisco Morazán
Mario Alonso Pérez López	Santa Bárbara
Martha Concepción Figueroa	Santa Bárbara
Mauricio Oliva	Choluteca
Miguel Ángel Gámez	Intibucá
Miguel Edgardo Martínez	Comayagua
Milton Jesús Puerto	Yoro
Nora Gúnera de Melgar	Francisco Morazán
Oscar Orlando Burgos	Yoro
Oscar Ramón Nájera	Colón
Ramón Antonio Bueso Leiva	Atlántida
Rigoberto Chang Castillo	Francisco Morazán
Roberto Gámez Panchamé	Yoro
Rodolfo Irias Navas	Atlántida
Roxana Geraldina González	Cortés
Feisal Canahuati	Cortés
Salvador Valeriano Pineda	Lempira
Victoria Carrasco	Cortés
Walter Antonio Chávez	El Paraíso
Welsy Vásquez	Cortés
Wilfredo Bustillo Castellanos	Comayagua
Yessenia Coely Zelaya	Choluteca
Abraham Kafati Díaz	El Paraíso
Alberto Chedrani	Cortés
Ana Julia García	Valle
Antonio Rivera Callejas	Francisco Morazán
Brenda Mercedes Flores	Cortés
Carlos Ramón Aguilar Guifarro	Colón
Claudio Roberto Perdomo	Santa Bárbara
Dennis Roberto Velásquez	Comayagua
Elden Vasquez	Intibucá
Eliseo Noel Mejía	Cortés
Fredy Espinoza Mondragón	Choluteca
George Romeo Silvestri	Islas de la Bahía
Gillian Guifarro Montes de Oca	Olancho
Gladys Aurora López	La Paz
Gladys Bernarda Casco	Choluteca
José Juan Rivera Ramos	La Paz
José Maria Martínez	Comayagua
Oswaldo Ramos Soto	Francisco Morazán
José Rodolfo Zelaya	Francisco Morazán
José Tomás Zambrano	Valle
José Vicente León	Copán
Marcio René Espinal	Atlántida
Jorge Humberto Pinto	Copán
Gustavo Adolfo Alvarado	Copán
Armando Calidonio	Cortés
Héctor Guillén	Cortés
Dario Gámez Panchamé	Cortés
Yaudet Burbara	Cortés
Oscar Álvarez	Francisco Morazán
Nasry Asfura	Francisco Morazán
Lena Gutiérrez	Francisco Morazán
Nelly Jerez	Francisco Morazán
Renan Inestroza	Francisco Morazán
Maylo Wood Granwell	Gracias a Dios
Román Villeda Aguilar	Ocotepeque
Reinaldo Antonio Sánchez	Olancho
Luis Javier Menocal	Olancho
José Francisco Rivera Hernández	Olancho
Rolando Dubón Bueso	Santa Bárbara

== Liberal Party of Honduras ==
Name	Department
Margarita Dabdoub Sikaffi	Atlántida
Maria Aracely Leiva	Atlántida
Gonzalo Antonio Rivera	Atlántida
Midence Oquelí Martínez Turcios	Colón
Samuel Martínez Durón	Colón
Valentín Suárez Osejo	Comayagua
Olman Danery Maldonado	Comayagua
Fabián Discua Carranza	Comayagua
Lisandro Mauricio Arias	Copán
Marcio Vega	Copán
José Ángel Saavedra	Copán
Marlon Guillermo Lara Orellana	Cortés
Ángel Darío Banegas	Cortés
Yani Rosenthal	Cortés
Wenceslao Lara Orellana	Cortés
Jacobo Regalado	Cortés
Norma Haydee Calderón	Cortés
Yuri Sabas	Choluteca
Carlos Alfredo Lara Watson	Choluteca
Maria Bertilia Zepeda	Choluteca
José León Castillo	Choluteca
Ramiro Adalid Chacón	El Paraíso
Mario Edgardo Segura	El Paraíso
Waldina Paz	Francisco Morazán
Perla Simons	Francisco Morazán
Marcia Facussé Andonie	Francisco Morazán
Yadira Bendaña	Francisco Morazán
Marco Antonio Andino	Francisco Morazán
José Azcona Bocock	Francisco Morazán
Felipe Zúniga del Cid	Intibucá
Manuel Iván Fiallos	La Paz
Erick Mauricio Rodríguez	Lempira
Teófilo Enamorado	Lempira
Luis Rigoberto Santos	Ocotepeque
Fredy Renán Nájera	Olancho
Elman Joel Sandoval	Olancho
Víctor Rolando Sabillón	Santa Bárbara
Jesús Dagoberto Perdomo	Santa Bárbara
Dennis Antonio Sánchez	Santa Bárbara
José Alfredo Saavedra	Valle
Eleazar Alexander Juárez	Valle
José Tomás Ponce	Yoro
Selvin Laínez	Yoro
José Arnulfo López	Yoro

== Christian Democracy ==
Name	Department
Jorge Elvir	Atlántida
Sadia Argueta	Cortés
Ramón Velásquez Názar	Francisco Morazán
Augusto Cruz Asensio	Francisco Morazán
Orle Solís	Olancho

== Democratic Unification ==
Name	Department
Edwin Pavón	Cortés
Marvin Ponce	Francisco Morazán
Sergio Arturo Castellanos	Santa Bárbara
Hipólita Rodríguez	Yoro

== Innovation and Unity Party ==
Name	Department
Toribio Aguilera	Cortés
Mario Ernesto Rivera Vásquez	Francisco Morazán
German Leitzelar	Francisco Morazán
