= Parliamentary candidates in the 2013 Honduran general election =

== Atlántida ==
Atlántida (8 MPs)
UD (Democratic Unification)	1 Pedro Guevara	2 Maria Alberto Hernandez	3 Javier Arquimides Martinez Reyes	4 Ramon Nectaly Guardado
UD (Democratic Unification)	5 Noemi Yadira Castañeda Lopez	6 Alix Virginia Zapata	7 Aldo Javier Cardona Alvarado	8 Hicta Paulina Perez Mejia
DC (Christian Democracy)	9 Jose Armando Logan	10; Jorge Alberto Elvir Cruz	11; Gloria Maria Sarmiento Nuñez	12; Kennia Yamileth Montero Martinez
DC (Christian Democracy)	13; Ramon Antonio Varela Medina	14; Kenia Fabiola Chiesa Elvir	15; Ana Maribel Valle Rivera	16; Josue Eleazer Aleman Izcoa
APH (Patriotic Alliance)	17; Dagoberto Cruz Santos	18; Mirian Elizabeth Villanueva Blanco	19; Victor Daniel Escobar Peña	20; Sila Claritza Mena Burgos
APH (Patriotic Alliance)	21; Fermin Corrales Estrada	22; Ana Julissa Vilorio Bodden	23; Francisco Jose Alvarado Zaldivar	24; Mirtha Esther Hernandez Dolmo
PL (Liberal Party)	25; Christian Reniery Santamaria	26; Maria Aracely Leiva Peña	27; Hector Pavel Fajardo Orellana	28; Dournof Delmar Alvarado McNab
PL (Liberal Party)	29; Iris Leticia Molinero Canales	30; Alba Ruth Zavala Irias	31; Jerry Francisco Sabio Amaya	32; Gonzalo Antonio Rivera
PAC (Anti-Corruption Party)	33 (candidature withdrawn)	34; Tomas Antonio Ramirez Hernandez	35; Carlos Mauricio Argeñal Castro	36; Gabriela Guzman Mejia
PAC (Anti-Corruption Party)	37; Obdulio Madrid Zeron	38; Kritza Jerlin Perez Gallegos	39 (candidature withdrawn)	40; Carlos Arturo San Martin Amador
LIBRE (Liberty & Refoundation)	41; Joaquin Baldemar Alvarado	42; Audelia Rodriguez Rodriguez	43; Jose Anibal Rodriguez Milla	44; Cesar Humberto Agurcia Lopez
LIBRE (Liberty & Refoundation)	45; Belin Bekker Rosa Calix	46; Jose Manuel Santos Villeda	47; Jose Adalid Rodriguez Rosa	48; Gloria Cristina Torres Sevilla
FAPER (Political Broad Front in Resistance)	49; Alicia de Jesus Alvarez Acosta	50; Vilma Yolanda Pineda Ramirez	51; Santos Aristeo Lainez Hernandez	52; Cristobal Crispi Oliva Mejia
FAPER (Political Broad Front in Resistance)	53; Marcio Renieri Castellanos	54; Juana Concepcion Aguilar Avelar	55; Norma Patricia Guevara Gamez	56; Arlen Carolina Martinez Guzman
PINU (Innovation and Unity Party)	57; Bernard Marinez Valerio	58; Gladys Lizzette Zapata Guerrero	59; Elbin Antonio Orellana Bermudez	60; Yeimy Lizbeth Zaldivar Castellanos
PINU (Innovation and Unity Party)	61; Guillermo Escoto Rodriguez	62; Melida Juliana Quevedo Ramirez	63; Warren Lopez Flores	64; Lidia Zenaida Fernandez Garcia
PN (National Party)	65; Rodolfo Irias Navas	66; Carmen Esperanza Rivera Pagoaga	67; Ramon Antonio Leva Bulnes	68; Marco Antonio Midence Milla
PN (National Party)	69; Daniel Flores Velasquez	70; Francis Yolanda Castro Rodriguez	71; Iveth Obdulia Matute Betancourth	72; Marcio Rene Espinal Cardona

== Bay Islands ==
Bay Islands (1 MP)
UD (Democratic Unification)	1 Henry Alexander Zelaya Santos
DC (Christian Democracy)	2 José Uriel Rosales Miranda
APH (Patriotic Alliance)	3 Jorge Alexander Antunez
PL (Liberal Party)	4 Jerry Dave Hynds Julio
PAC (Anti-Corruption Party)	5 Oscar Augusto Lobo
LIBRE (Liberty & Refoundation)	6 Gustavo Adolfo Arriola Arias
FAPER (Political Broad Front in Resistance)	7 Óscar Pérez Guillén
PINU (Innovation and Unity Party)	8 Juan Carlos Gabarrete
PN (National Party)	9 George Romeo Silvestri

== Colón ==
Colón (4 MPs)
UD (Democratic Unification)	1 Adolfo Castañeda Padilla	2 Blanca Sulema Perez Sambula
UD (Democratic Unification)	3 Coronado Avila Munguia	4 Glirian Yanira Bardales Garrido
DC (Christian Democracy)	5 Doroteo Ventura Santos	6 Juana Oneyda Hernandez Castro
DC (Christian Democracy)	7 Maria Magdalena Bonilla Sanchez	8 Leonardo Damian Ramos Martin
APH (Patriotic Alliance)	9 Miguel Angel Garin Tejada	10; Idalia Judith Suazo Chimilo
APH (Patriotic Alliance)	11; Onasis Samir Serrano Ortiz	12; Aura Yamileth Medina Gutierrez
PL (Liberal Party)	13; Midence Oquely Martinez Turcios	14; Mayra Rosibel Pavon Umanzor
PL (Liberal Party)	15; Alfredo David Ramos Castillo	16; Samuel Martinez Duron
PAC (Anti-Corruption Party)	17; Iris Yamileth Duarte Aleman	18; Dania Valentina Mena Arzu
PAC (Anti-Corruption Party)	19; Melvin Eriberto Velásquez Argueta	20; Luis Adan Ochoa Matamoros
LIBRE (Liberty & Refoundation)	21; Wilfredo Paz Zuniga	22; Adelmo Rubilio Ramos Rivera
LIBRE (Liberty & Refoundation)	23; Tatiana Ninoska Canales Gonzales	24; Yoni Rivas Baire
FAPER (Political Broad Front in Resistance)	25; Luis Alonso Membreño Castillo	26; Kelia Lilibeth Cruz Garcia
FAPER (Political Broad Front in Resistance)	27; Danis Oralia Rodriguez Sanchez	28; Daisy Suyapa Cruz Ramos
PINU (Innovation and Unity Party)	29; Domingo Pineda Benitez	30; Wilson Armando Sanchez Romero
PINU (Innovation and Unity Party)	31; Erika Yamileth Galdamez Rojas	32; Karen Lizzeth Munguia
PN (National Party)	33; Oscar Ramón Nájera	34; Carlos Ramón Aguilar Guifarro
PN (National Party)	35; Ghisell Padilla Pelayo	36; Sonia Yamileth Garcia Vilorio

== Comayagua ==
Comayagua (7 MPs)
UD (Democratic Unification)	1 Saúl Benjamín Zapata	2 Orlyn Daniel Flores Mejía	3 Miguel Ángel Galeano	4 Martius Leonel Magaña Centeno
UD (Democratic Unification)	5 Dunia Lorena López Canales	6 Derling Alfaro Carranza	7 Gloria Julissa Rivera	
DC (Christian Democracy)	8 Santos Humberto Hernández Mejía	9 Jorge Alberto Abrego	10; Tegualda Gaete Santos	11; María Evangelina Chaver
DC (Christian Democracy)	12; René Alexander Ventura	13; Laura Marina Escoto	14; Ada Fernández Morales	
APH (Patriotic Alliance)	15; José Alberto Melgar	16; Miriam Valdivieso Argueta	17; Luther Celestino Hyde	18; Tania Milagros Domínguez
APH (Patriotic Alliance)	19; Mauricio Bonilla García	20; Francisco Paz Osorio	21; Teresa de Jesús Donaire Vásquez	
PL (Liberal Party)	22; Gloria Argentina Bonilla	23; José Armando Cerros Chávez	24; Olman Danery Maldonado	25; Víctor Manuel Barahona
PL (Liberal Party)	26; Valentín Suárez Osejo	27; Guillermo Martínez Suazo	28; Martha Lidya Rivera Torres	
PAC (Anti-Corruption Party)	29; Lilian Yaneth Villatoro	30; Luciano Paz Arévalo	31; Gerardo Javier Solorzano	32; Miguel Virgilio Ramírez López
PAC (Anti-Corruption Party)	33; Walterina Ramírez López	34; José Armando Calderón Ramírez	35; Alma Karina Mejía Sánchez	
LIBRE (Liberty & Refoundation)	36; Juan Ramón Flores Buezo	37; Yavhe Salvador Sabillón Cruz	38; Fany Patricia Valladares	39; Ancelmo Romero Ulloa
LIBRE (Liberty & Refoundation)	40; Ada Serrano Núñez	41; Juan Carlos Ávila Ávila	42; Salomón Castillo Osorio	
FAPER (Political Broad Front in Resistance)	43; Tirso Ulloa Ulloa	44; Bernardino Espinoza Palma	45; José Dolores Urquía Lara	46; Dimas Rivera Discua
FAPER (Political Broad Front in Resistance)	47; Yeni Yolanda Domínguez	48; Ena Felicita Guillén Escobar	49; María Isnelda Mejía Cantor	
PINU (Innovation and Unity Party)	50; Antonia Alvarado	51; Alba Carixa Maradiaga	52; Geovani Soto	53; Karen Iveth Benitez Morales
PINU (Innovation and Unity Party)	54; Francisco Caballero Paredes	55; Mario Alexis Mejía Durón	56; María Pacheco Carranza	
PN (National Party)	57; José María Martínez Valenzuela	58; Miguel Edgardo Martínez Pineda	59; Gerardo Tulio Martínez Pinedo	60; Denis Roberto Velásquez Yanes
PN (National Party)	61; Oscar Emilio Cruz Pineda	62; Ana Valenzuela Duarte	63; Santos Discua Zepeda	

== Copán ==
Copán (7 MPs)
DC (Christian Democracy)	1 Dunia Lisseth Mata Chinchilla	2 Juán Antonio Pérez Montufar	3 Katherine Naszary Mejía	4 Ezequiel Morales Tábora
DC (Christian Democracy)	5 Eddas Mauricio Guevara	6 Nancy Francisca Casco Gómez	7 Donis Marlen Cáceres	
APH (Patriotic Alliance)	8 Jony Alexander Esquivel Dubón	9 Evelin Daniela Ríos	10; Cintia Dolores Torres Pineda	11 (candidature withdrawn)
APH (Patriotic Alliance)	12; Ricardo Alonso Mejía Arévalo	13; Arnulfo Josué Fuentes Barrera	14 (candidature withdrawn)	
PL (Liberal Party)	15; Juan Carlos Elvir Martel	16; Lisandro Mauricio Arias	17; José Eduardo Gauggel Medina	18; Elvis Edgardo Lemus España
PL (Liberal Party)	19; Julio César Santos Tobar	20; Trancito Maribel Chinchilla Sorto	21; Óscar Valenzuela Morales	
PAC (Anti-Corruption Party)	22; César Daniel Bueso Orellana	23; Francis Omar Cabrera	24; Nelson Gerardo Tábora Zerón	25; Águeda María Interiano Baide
PAC (Anti-Corruption Party)	26; Maryory Murillo Herrera	27; Iris Lisseth Bueso Polanco	28; Carlos Antonio Alvarado Arita	
LIBRE (Liberty & Refoundation)	29; Elvia Argentina Valle	30; José Omar Rodríguez Interiano	31; Edwin Dagoberto López Lone	32; Scarleth Ivette Romero Cantarero
LIBRE (Liberty & Refoundation)	33; Manuel de Jesús Mejía	34; Mario Reyes	35; Gilma Janeth Trejo Bejarano	
UD/FAPER (Political Broad Front in Resistance/Democratic Unification Alliance)	36; Miguel Ángel López Contreras	37; Jorge Armando Pleitez Palencia	38; Raúl Antonio Madrid Argueta	39; Digna Esperanza Mejía
UD/FAPER (Political Broad Front in Resistance/Democratic Unification Alliance)	40; Leidy Iveth Gutiérrez	41; Miriam Vanessa Cruz Muñoz	42; Héctor Alexander Arita Martínez	
PINU (Innovation and Unity Party)	43; Duvis Oneyda Bautista Claros	44; José Francisco Tábora Dias	45; Claudia María López Lara	46; Heydi Beatriz Pérez Arita
PINU (Innovation and Unity Party)	47; Miguel Ángel Reyes Erazo	48; Fátima Ondina López García	49; Maykol López Mejía	
PN (National Party)	50; Héctor Hugo Pinto Aguilar	51; Carlos Roberto Guevara Velásquez	52; Lourdes Ernestina Fajardo	53; Julio César Gámez Interiano
PN (National Party)	54; José Vicente León Rojas	55; Rosmery Ayala Batres	56; Jorge Humberto Pinto Portillo	

== Cortés ==
Cortés (20 MPs)
UD (Democratic Unification)	1 Edwin Pavón	2 Esequías Doblado Hernández	3 Claudio Marcelo Villafranca Núñez	4 Miguel Fernando Ruíz Rápalo	5 Raúl Edgardo Chinchilla Aguilar
UD (Democratic Unification)	6 Romer Xavier Chávez Linarez	7 Susana Castillo Velásquez	8 Sonia Esperanza Bonilla Guevara	9 Brenda Jaqueline Moreno	10; Alex Antonio Ávila
UD (Democratic Unification)	11; Erika Tahina Ávila Reyes	12; Danilo Mejía Borjas	13; Yesenia Waleska Andino López	14; Emilia Leiva Ayala	15; Juán Francisco González Portillo
UD (Democratic Unification)	16; Alberto Cruz Torres	17; Juan Ramón de Jesús Vallecillo	18; María Catalina Rivera Díaz	19; Damary Mejía Amaya	20; Danilo Omar Isaula Vásquez
DC (Christian Democracy)	21; Carlos Aguinaldo Turcios Matute	22; Irma Amelia Cerrato	23; Sadia Argueta	24; Norman Portillo Velásquez	25; Celestino Argueta
DC (Christian Democracy)	26; Timoteo Ochoa Díaz	27; Mario Alberto Soto Valle	28; Dunia Aracely López López	29; Luis Rafael Ramírez	30; Fredesvinda Gutiérrez Ortíz
DC (Christian Democracy)	31; Dalia Suyapa Dubón Alemán	32; José Ricardo Sierra Chavarria	33; Carlos Javier Funez	34; Aquiles Isaac Cálix Mejía	35; Jorge Adalberto Rodríguez Cardenas
DC (Christian Democracy)	36; Ana Leonor Velásquez	37; Luis Antonio Flores Velásquez	38; Axel Antonio Quiroz	39; Ruth Esther Castro Gómez	40; Jeanette Nohemy Guerra
APH (Patriotic Alliance)	41; Irwing Guardado Veroy	42; José Mario Berrios Serrano	43; Juan Constantino Marinakys Zelaya	44; Gabriela Rosario Vásquez	45; Jesús Enamorado Alvarado
APH (Patriotic Alliance)	46; Gladys Patricia Enamorado Padilla	47; Jordi Ricardo Montañola	48; Félix Justo Freije	49; Eucebio Acosta Zúniga	50; César Augusto Hernández Peña
APH (Patriotic Alliance)	51; Manuel de Jesús Licona Castro	52; Manuel Antonio Amaya	53; Annuar Alfredo Suazo Kattán	54; Brenda Patricia Enamorado	55; Gregorio Ocampo Zúniga
APH (Patriotic Alliance)	56; Ana Eysabel Gómez	57; Martín Sánchez González	58; Karen Dinora Ortega Osorto	59; Digna Angélica Lara Espinoza	60; Nanci Yadira Vásquez
PL (Liberal Party)	61; Marlon Guillermo Lara Orellana	62; Ángel Darío Banegas	63; Felipa Elizabeth Ávila Jiménez	64; Georgina Yamileth Barahona	65; Carolina Velásquez Matamoros
PL (Liberal Party)	66; Juan Jorge Canahuati	67; Rafael Tadeo Nodarse Banegas	68; María Dolores Guardado	69; Reyna Virginia Alvarado Barahona	70; Carlos Antonio Alvarado Zepeda
PL (Liberal Party)	71; Norma Haydee Calderón	72; Ingrid Alina Montes Rendón	73; Justa Aurelia Suazo Bernardez	74; Wenceslao Lara Orellana	75; José Antonio Barahona Zelaya
PL (Liberal Party)	76; Cinthya Pamela Menocal Turcios	77; José Antonio Fernández Flores	78; Ricardo Efraín Figueroa	79; Jorge Antonio Camacho Fajardo	80; Miguel Ángel Barahona López
PAC (Anti-Corruption Party)	81; Luis Rolando Redondo Guifarro	82; Fátima Patricia Mena Baide	83; Walter Alex Banegas	84; Luis René Oliva Romero	85; Anibal Javier Cálix Fúnez
PAC (Anti-Corruption Party)	86; Rolando Enrique López	87; Erasmo Antonio Sanabria Chinchilla	88; Jaime Villegas	89; Edy Mauricio Peña Carías	90; Roberto Valenzuela Medina
PAC (Anti-Corruption Party)	91; Katty Ester Sosa García	92; Juan Ramón López Bendeck	93; Yesica Carolina Muñoz Gonzales	94; Verónica Torres Rivera	95; Carlos Donanim Montes Orellana
PAC (Anti-Corruption Party)	96; Verónica Isabel Tróchez Sabillón	97; José Medardo Caballero Moncada	98; Margarita Zulema Hernández	99; María Erlinda Enamorado	100; Catalina Ponce Posas
LIBRE (Liberty & Refoundation)	101; José Edgardo Castro Rodríguez	102; Laura Elena Noriega	103; Silvia Ayala	104; José Eduardo Coto Barnica	105; Scherly Melissa Arriaga
LIBRE (Liberty & Refoundation)	106; Yenny Melissa Murillo	107; Orfilia Esperanza Carranza	108; René Bladimir González Alfaro	109; Jose Luis Cruz Rivera	110; José Arnulfo Aguilar
LIBRE (Liberty & Refoundation)	111; Ana Carolina Cartagena	112; Reyna Suyapa Murillo Gutiérrez	113; Reyna Concepción Pineda	114; Dulce María Villanueva Sánchez	115; Luis Alonso García Bustamante
LIBRE (Liberty & Refoundation)	116; Ruy Díaz Díaz	117; Marco Tulio del Arca	118; René Altamirano Interiano	119; Víctor Manuel Rosa Ramos	120; Gladis Esmeralda Delcid Nieto
FAPER (Political Broad Front in Resistance)	121; Marco Antonio Bhaday Chávez	122; Aster Ascanio Alegría	123; Jesús Ortega García	124; Irma Cristela Hernández	125; Alfonso Felipe Rosado Galeano
FAPER (Political Broad Front in Resistance)	126; Reyna Maritza Torres Mejía	127; Iván Francisco Mejía Flores	128; Jony Nectalí Rosales Ramos	129; Gary Alexander Rodríguez Villanueva	130; Gloria Esmeralda Castro Serandia
FAPER (Political Broad Front in Resistance)	131; Alejandro Rodríguez Bardales	132; Kelvin Hernán Zaldivar López	133; Josefina Morales Pineda	134; Marlen Yaneth Paz Paz	135; Osmara Argueta Lozano
FAPER (Political Broad Front in Resistance)	136; Italo Marcelo Garay Barrientos	137; Sara Ramírez Serrano	138; Edith Xiomara Cruz	139; Marvin Emilio Fúnez Rodríguez	140; Melvin Omar Bronfield Aguirre
PINU (Innovation and Unity Party)	141; Toribio Aguilera	142; Osmán Maldonado Ortíz	143; Xiomara Lizeth Pavón	144; Melvin Geovany Florez Canales	145; Elizabeth Contreras
PINU (Innovation and Unity Party)	146; José Dionicio Ponce Palacios	147; Fernando Mateo Garrigo	148; Francisco Rodolfo Jiménez	149; Luis Fernando Ramírez	150; Bertha Lydia Coello Hernández
PINU (Innovation and Unity Party)	151; Pedro René González Barahona	152; Karla Patricia Herrera Ulloa	153; Gisella María Altamirano Sánchez	154; Victorino Carranza Ponce	155; Julio Ismael Rápalo Zepeda
PINU (Innovation and Unity Party)	156; Martha Leticia Norales	157; Zinia Yamilet Vargas Gallegos	158; Eugenio Herrera Quiroz	159; Sergio Rolando Brocato Martínez	160; Maura Aracely Funez Martínez
PN (National Party)	161; Alberto Chedrani	162; Welsy Vásquez	163; Arturo Bendaña Pinel	164; Yaudet Burbara	165; Leda Lizethe García Pagán
PN (National Party)	166; Roxana Geraldina González	167; Zoila Wiladina Chiang Cortés	168; Melvin Ferraro Laínez	169; Gabriel García Ardón	170; Reynaldo Geovanni Ekonomo
PN (National Party)	171; Brenda Mercedes Flores Serrano	172; Eliseo Noel Mejía	173; Max Alejandro Gonzáles Sabillón	174; Victoria Carrasco	175; Omahara Hernández Trujillo
PN (National Party)	176; Wendy Carolina Estévez Paredes	177; José Antonio Montalván Villafranca	178; Leo Yamir Castellón Hirezi	179; Iris Yasmin Perdomo Sandoval	180; Ernesto Lazarus Pineda

== Choluteca ==
Choluteca (9 MPs)
UD (Democratic Unification)	1 Gerson Hernández Oviedo	2 Benedicto Cárcamo Mejía	3 Dilcia Esmeralda Sandoval Auceda	4 Felipe Nery Espinal López	5 José Francisco Ramírez Pineda
UD (Democratic Unification)	6 Rosibel Zepeda Ochoa	7 Nora Odalys Escobar Pover	8 María Clarett Velásquez	9 Yelson Joel Ponce Ordoñez	
DC (Christian Democracy)	10; Luis Alonso Marcia Hernández	11; Brenda Isolina Erazo Herrera	12; Elmer Noé García Morán	13; Lourdes Rosmery Ferrufino Cuevas	14; Oscar Arnulfo Cruz
DC (Christian Democracy)	15; Lizbeth Alejandro Sosa Euceda	16; Jorge Manuel Lazo	17; Rosa Elena Martínez	18; José Rafael Berrios Flores	
APH (Patriotic Alliance)	19; Felícita María Carranza Ordóñez	20; Karla Patricia Aguilar	21; José Ramón Sierra Zamora	22; Claudia Angelina Martínez Castillo	23; Nelson Omar Funez Flores
APH (Patriotic Alliance)	24; Oscar Espinal Baquedano	25; Blanca Lidia García Lizama	26; Mayra Karina Oyuela Estrada	27; Gonzalo Johel Romero Álvarez	
PL (Liberal Party)	28; Yury Sabas	29; Carlos Alfredo Lara Watson	30; María Bertilia Zepeda Lagos	31; Óscar Alfredo Benavides Ordoñez	32; Fredy Omar Chavarría Castillo
PL (Liberal Party)	33; Gary Ramón Maradiaga Soriano	34; Felipe Nery Méndez Soriano	35; Blanca Margarita Oyuela Carrasco	36; María Estelita Canales Ordoñez	
PAC (Anti-Corruption Party)	37; David Armando Reyes Sorto	38; Karen Melissa Linarez Osorto	39; Ricardo Leonel Dávila Vieras	40; Julio César Farach Narváez	41; Jorge Eliú Pérez Domínguez
PAC (Anti-Corruption Party)	42; Belinda Patricia Marcia Bonilla	43; Trudis Aminda Corrales Osorto	44; Darmy Adelaida Estrada Villalobos	45; Luis Fernando Coello	
LIBRE (Liberty & Refoundation)	46; Luis Geovany Martínez Sánchez	47; Ángel Enrique Sandoval López	48; Héctor Enrique Padilla Hernández	49; Cristóbal Jowany Rodríguez Amador	50; Dilma Doris Ramírez
LIBRE (Liberty & Refoundation)	51; Francisco Javier Lazo Mercado	52; Hernán Abel Carrasco Mayorga	53; Martha Lidia Armas	54; Mercedes Baca Paz	
FAPER (Political Broad Front in Resistance)	55; Ronald Adalberto Ruíz Vindel	56; Franklin Erick Toruño Colindres	57; Carlos Fabricio Flores Baca	58; Karen Marleny Izaguirre	59; Julia Maritza Vásquez Ponce
FAPER (Political Broad Front in Resistance)	60; María Leonor Tercero Méndez	61; Lesli Abigail Herrera Sosa	62; Raquel Montalván	63; Nancy Raquel Portillo	
PINU (Innovation and Unity Party)	64; Modesto Herrera Sánchez	65; Gloria Azucena Martínez Guillén	66; José Mercedes Estrada Martínez	67; Lydia de Jesús Herrera	68; Herles Misael Giménez
PINU (Innovation and Unity Party)	69; Emérita Anduray Fuentes	70; Gerson Leonel Espino Maradiaga	71; Gloria Esperanza Cruz Godoy	72; José Irecio Bonilla Bonilla	
PN (National Party)	73; Mauricio Oliva Herrera	74; Carlos Roberto Ledezma Casco	75; Francisco Antonio Macías Ortega	76; Vilma Guadalupe Aguilar	77; María Emérita Bardales Hernández
PN (National Party)	78; Rodanin Peralta	79; Fredy Espinoza Mondragón	80; Juán Francisco Argeñal Espinal	81; Juana Isabel Laínez Aguilar	
Independent Candidature "United For Choluteca"	82; José César Ortega Souza				

== El Paraíso ==
El Paraíso (6 MPs)
UD (Democratic Unification)	1 Jacobo Adolfo Flores	2 José Hernán Figueroa Rodríguez	3 Consuelo Amparo Villalta
UD (Democratic Unification)	4 Esmilda Marily Baquedano	5 Lidesky Milenia Argeñal Martínez	6 Adolfo Enrique García
DC (Christian Democracy)	7 José David Moncada	8 Flerida Aida Valladares	9 Oscar Emilio Carrasco Peralta
DC (Christian Democracy)	10; Naudia Maricela Borden Reyes	11; Ermis Yobanis Chavarría López	12; María José Solíz Mercado
APH (Patriotic Alliance)	13; Marvin César Fonseca Martínez	14; Wendy Yajaira Coto	15; Juan Ángel Álvarez Gómez
APH (Patriotic Alliance)	16; Karla Ninoska Martínez Herrera	17; Ángel Amado Díaz García	18; Herenia Bermúdez Trejo
PL (Liberal Party)	19; Rodrigo Castillo Flores	20; Ramón Chacón Ferrufino	21; Mario Edgardo Segura
PL (Liberal Party)	22; Fredy Alberto Pastrana	23; King Lenard Varela Álvarez	24; Luis Alberto Sanabria Caballero
PAC (Anti-Corruption Party)	25; Carlos Omar Oliva	26; Óscar Armando Alcántara Amador	27; Claudia Emilia Ávila Acuña
PAC (Anti-Corruption Party)	28; Sally Xiomara Maradiaga Mendoza	29; Santos Arcelio Lagos	30; Merary Gissela González Oseguera
LIBRE (Liberty & Refoundation)	31; Francisco Javier Paz Laínez	32; Claudia Lorena Garmendia Garay	33; Jorge Arturo Zavala Flores
LIBRE (Liberty & Refoundation)	34; Nehemías Martínez Argueta	35; Luis Alberto Posadas Alfaro	36; Daisy Guadalupe Rivera Ardón
FAPER (Political Broad Front in Resistance)	37; Arlett del Carmen Acuña	38; Karla Patricia Sosa Fortín	39; Sindy Mariela Rodríguez Moncada
FAPER (Political Broad Front in Resistance)	40; Claudia Yiseel Castellanos	41; Luis Arturo Salgado Centeno	42; Héctor Nahún Martínez Sosa
PINU (Innovation and Unity Party)	43; José León Aguilar	44; Oscar Emilio Menjívar Rubí	45; Ena Karolina Pozo
PINU (Innovation and Unity Party)	46; Marlen Gricelda Fernández Méndez	47; Olga Alicia Gamero Parria	48; Edy Alexis Murillo
PN (National Party)	49; Celín Discua	50; Sara Ismela Medina Galo	51; Walter Antonio Chávez
PN (National Party)	52; César Humberto Cerrato Flores	53; Marisabel del Carmen Ferrufino Flores	54; Héctor Efraín Vallejo Cerna

== Francisco Morazán ==
Francisco Morazán (23 MPs)
UD (Democratic Unification)	1 Marvin Ponce Sauceda	2 Mederlyn Dayanie Lopez Jacome	3 Juan Fernando Gonzales	4 Milgia del Carmen Hernandez Suazo	5 Rafael Leonidas Diaz Alcerro	6 Yeny Fernanda Castillo Escalante
UD (Democratic Unification)	7 Carlos Alejandro Hernandez Soto	8 Yohana Rebeca Fu Peña	9 Gustavo Mendieta Murcia	10; Neira Yareli Banegas Osorio	11; Favio Enrique Moncada Nuñez	12; Marta Alicia Meza Lagos
UD (Democratic Unification)	13; Edwin Alexander Cardona Galvez	14; Abella Ester Carbajal Paz	15; Osmin David Valle Castillo	16; Yeny Yaqueline Sauceda Ramos	17; Adonis Fernando Colindres Amador	18; Mercedes del Rosario Gomez Zuniga
UD (Democratic Unification)	19; José Antonio Cruz Oliva	20; Koritza Raquel Blanco Lopez	21; Nelson Josue Flores Mejia	22; Jarvin Roberto Sanchez Jimenez	23; Arjany Mariela Ramos	
DC (Christian Democracy)	24; Felicito Avila Ordoñez	25; Juan Ramon Velsquez Nazar	26; Augusto Domingo Cruz Asensio	27; Nelly Esperanza Muñoz Muñoz	28; David Arturo Aguilera Vallejo	29; Marco Antonio Suazo
DC (Christian Democracy)	30; Norma Patricia Martinez Zelaya	31; Estela Margarita Martinez Gonzales	32; Edgardo Alfonso Navarrete Melghem	33; Jose Julio Edmundo Marquez Peñalva	34; Eduardo Jorge Gaete Mejia	35; Karent Yadira Ulloa Romero
DC (Christian Democracy)	36; Karla Lizeth Montoya Pavon	37; Martha Elena Guevara Sequiera	38; Elsa Vargas Gonzalez	39; Maria Paz Gomez Castro	40; Jose Enrique Soto Navas	41; Nieves Fernando Perez Alvarado
DC (Christian Democracy)	42; Maria Francisca Rosales Rodriguez	43; Heriberto Flores Lagos	44; Gracibel Escoto Licona	45; Antonio Amador Barrientos	46; Odalis Yasmin Flores Rivera	
APH (Patriotic Alliance)	47; Billy Fernando Joya Amendola	48; Gloria Maritza Garcia Suarez	49; Miguel Enrique Nolasco Lopez	50; Karla Jeanine Padilla Reyes	51; Francisca Maribel Salgado Padilla	52; Tulio Armando Valladares Herrera
APH (Patriotic Alliance)	53; Bryan O'Nell Hernandez Medina	54; Adan Flaubert Rodriguez Sierra	55; Eduard Francisco Moreno Padilla	56; Fatima Viviana Hernandez	57; Nessy Minneth Suazo Melendez	58; Rosa Marivel Midence Alberto
APH (Patriotic Alliance)	59; Marvin Rigoberto Espinal Pinel	60; Delia Emeli Laitano Giron	61; Oscar Antonio Breve Duarte	62; Ivonne Esmeralda Pinto Rubio	63; Victor Lopez Sevilla	64; Julia Francisca Reyes Casco
APH (Patriotic Alliance)	65; Carlos Eduardo Suazo Diaz	66; Lilian Judith Miranda Murillo	67; Deysi Xiomara Castro Lainez	68; Francisco Javier Ramirez Acosta	69; Guido Antonio Bacci Grave de Peralta	
PL (Liberal Party)	70; Gabriela Nuñez Ennabe	71; Jariet Waldina Paz	72; Marco Antonio Andino Flores	73; Yadira Esperanza Bendaña Flores	74; Aixa Gabriela Zelaya Gomez	75; Hilda Aracely Pacheco Montero
PL (Liberal Party)	76; Angel Larissa Espinal Pinel	77; Jose Natanael Euceda Pacheco	78; Sandra Emilia Muñoz Reyes	79; Temis Caceres Andino	80; Amilcar Bulnes Hernandez	81; Lucio Izaguirre Romero
PL (Liberal Party)	82; Gabo Alfredo Jalil Mejia	83; Fabricio Jose Mejia Arita	84; Altagracia Sanchez Melendez	85; Jose Cecilio Cruz Guevara	86; Gustavo Adolfo Alfaro Zelaya	87; Silvio Danilo Pino Mercadal
PL (Liberal Party)	88; Mario Luis Noe Villafranca	89; Josuee Gerardo Aguilar Zelaya	90; Perla Simons Morales	91; Luis Alberto Martinez	92; Federico Duarte Acosta	
PAC (Anti-Corruption Party)	93; Claudia Patricia Rodriguez Rosales	94; Rafael Virgilio Padilla Paz	95; Carlos Alberto Zelaya Irias	96; Marlene Elizabeth Alvarenga Castellanos	97; Ramon Fernando Coto Mendez	98; Isaias Moran Pavon
PAC (Anti-Corruption Party)	99; Adela Maria Medina	100; Juan Carlos Berganza Godoy	101; Juan Fernando Redondo Guifarro	102; Milton Omar Turcios Caceres	103; Glenda Xiomara Osorio Nuñez	104; Gustavo Adolfo Manzanares Vaquero
PAC (Anti-Corruption Party)	105; Zenia Patricia Padgett Lagos	106; Ana Joselina Fortin Pineda	107; Dilcia Maribel Galo Juarez	108; Fernando Abel Valladares Alvarado	109; Jose Rafael Erazo Paisano	110; Jaime Ricardo Redondo Marini
PAC (Anti-Corruption Party)	111; Alejandro Carbajal Lizano	112; Maria Lourdez Lagoz Rodriguez	113; Jorge Alberto Giarelli Ferrera	114 (candidature withdrawn)	115; Sayra Iveth Aguilera Espinal	
LIBRE (Liberty & Refoundation)	116; Esdras Amado Lopez Rodriguez	117; Rasel Antonio Tome Flores	118; Pedro Rafael Alegria Moncada	119; Enrique Alberto Flores Lanza	120; Alejandro Villatoro Aguilar	121; Jose Luis Galdamez Alvarez
LIBRE (Liberty & Refoundation)	122; Delia Beatriz Valle Marichal	123; Jari Dixon Herrera Hernandez	124; Cesar Omar Silva Rosales	125; Gilberto Rios Munguia	126; Felix Ambrosio Sabio Gonzalez	127; Amadeo Osorto Lagos
LIBRE (Liberty & Refoundation)	128; Jose Luis Baquedano Hernandez	129; Fedra Nadime Thiebaud Garay	130; Dionisia Diaz Umaña	131; Jose Manuel Rodriguez Rosales	132; Norma Yanina Parada Martinez	133; Delmy Aracely Ordoñez Hernandez
LIBRE (Liberty & Refoundation)	134; Roberto Zelaya Sagastume	135; Dagoberto Suazo Zelaya	136; Aracely Flores Bueso	137; Javier Antonio Portillo Carbajal	138; Marco Eliud Giron Portillo	
FAPER (Political Broad Front in Resistance)	139; Marvin Geovanny Garcia Martinez	140; Marco Antonio Garcia Calix	141; Katia Arely Maradiaga Ponce	142; Angel Antonio Arguijo Galvez	143; Lorenzo Ubaldo Pavon Rodriguez	144; Emilio Arturo Guillen Sevilla
FAPER (Political Broad Front in Resistance)	145; Ilich David Pavon Lopez	146; Mariana Flores Vasquez	147; Edward Noel Lanza Claros	148; Alejandro Fernandez	149; Cesar Adin Barranza Luna	150; Luis Antonio Izaguirre Benitez
FAPER (Political Broad Front in Resistance)	151; Elsa Xiomara Garcia Flores	152; Reinery Velasquez Avila	153; Mirna del Carmen Moncada Pineda	154; Javier Martin Garay Colindres	155; Elia Yolanda Sierra Sanchez	156; Ernesto Carcamo Meza
FAPER (Political Broad Front in Resistance)	157; Tania Angelina Cruz Alvarado	158; Monica Dayanara Palacios Cardona	159; Thelma Patricia Rodriguez Espinoza	160; Xiomara Osorio Midence	161; Ericka Vanessa Maradiaga Hernandez	
PINU (Innovation and Unity Party)	162; German Edgardo Leitzelar Vidaurreta	163; Doris Alejandrina Gutierrez	164; Olban Francisco Valladares Ordoñez	165; Adriana Guevara Osorio	166; Carlos Andres Zelaya Elvir	167; Ana Rosa Andino Matamoros
PINU (Innovation and Unity Party)	168; Julio Santiago Soriano Miranda	169; Gladys Pavon Garmendia	170; Jose Oscar Moran Mendez	171; Maria Eugenia Toro Zuniga	172; Nelson Ivan Mejia Guardado	173; Yasmy Damarise Garcia
PINU (Innovation and Unity Party)	174; Jose Guillermo Cano Valladares	175; Ana Lucia Freije Murillo	176; Carlos Alberto Padilla Velasco	177; Lorena Mayen Elvir	178; Salvador Lovo Reichmann	179; Angie Geraldina Varela Meja
PINU (Innovation and Unity Party)	180; Mario Valentin Sanchez Valladares	181; Dora Lesvia Bracamonte Cortez	182; Roberto Eduardo Vallejo Diaz	183; Carmen Ondina Benedit Blanco	184; Mario Ernesto Rivera Vasquez	
PN (National Party)	185; Antonio Cesar Rivera Callejas	186; Wilmer Raynel Neal Velasquez	187; Juan Diego Zelaya Aguilar	188; Lena Karyn Gutierrez Arevalo	189; Rigoberto Chang Castillo	190; Jose Oswaldo Ramos Soto
PN (National Party)	191; David Guillermo Chavez Madison	192; Cossette Alejandra Lopez Osorio Aguilar	193; Lissi Marcela Matute Cano	194; Rossel Renan Inestroza Hernandez	195; Leonel Alejandro Giannini Espinal	196; Hector Virgilio Martinez Lozano
PN (National Party)	197; Waleska Marlene Zelaya Portillo	198; Jose Danilo Izaguirre Bonilla	199; Ramon Dagoberto Rodriguez Allen	200; Feryd Alberto Bascha Sahury	201; Leana Rebeca Martinez Caceres	202; Gaudy Alejandra Bustillo Martinez
PN (National Party)	203; Santos Orlando Morazan Ponce	204; Ada Maria Mejia Signorelli	205; Maria Elena Ordoñez Lazo	206; Jance Carolina Funes Dominguez	207; Oscar Arturo Alvarez Guerrero	
Independent Socialist Candidature	208; Fredin de Jesus Funez					

== Gracias a Dios ==
Gracias a Dios (1 MP)
DC (Christian Democracy)	1 Ezequiel Cruz Carrillo
APH (Patriotic Alliance)	2 Omar Edgardo Pérez Duarte
PL (Liberal Party)	3 Seth Paisano Wood
PAC (Anti-Corruption Party)	4 Emilia Miranda Martínez
LIBRE (Liberty & Refoundation)	5 Edmundo Flores Zúniga
UD/FAPER (Political Broad Front in Resistance/Democratic Unification Alliance)	6 Weber Melado Granwell
PINU (Innovation and Unity Party)	7 Marlen Manister Pamistan
PN (National Party)	8 Alberto Samuel Haylock Echeverría

== Intibucá ==
Intibucá (3 MPs)
DC (Christian Democracy)	1 José Alilian Díaz	2 María Mirsa Vijil Bautista	3 María de los Ángeles López Valladares
APH (Patriotic Alliance)	4 Héctor Aguilar Claros	5 Jose María Lemus Nolasco	6 Daisy Carolina Gutiérrez
PL (Liberal Party)	7 Jorge Maynor Vargas Díaz	8 María de la Paz Cantarero	9 Olga Graciela Bueso Meza
PAC (Anti-Corruption Party)	10; Juán Irene Girón Izaguirre	11; Oswal Lennin Cálix Mondragón	12; Alba Luz Manzanares Ramos
LIBRE (Liberty & Refoundation)	13; José Alberto Vásquez Cruz	14; Celso Sánchez Domínguez	15; María Suyapa Alemán Reyes
UD/FAPER (Political Broad Front in Resistance/Democratic Unification)	16; Olvin Reyniery Gonzáles Domínguez	17; Bertha Rosa Aguilar Aguilar	18; Juán Mejía
PINU (Innovation and Unity Party)	19; Kenia Argentina Sánchez Bautista	20; Delmy Yolibeth Hernández Amaya	21; Mario Vásquez Lemus
PN (National Party)	22; Elden Vásquez	23; Miguel Ángel Gámez	24; Hodalma Lisseth Benítez Erazo

== La Paz ==
La Paz (3 MPs)
UD (Democratic Unification)	1 Alejandro José Méndez Castillo	2 Nelson Méndez Isaula	3 Martza Elizabeth Arriaga
DC (Christian Democracy)	4 Saira Joselina Isaula Manueles	5 Luis Alonso Palomo Martínez	6 Julio César Orellana Vallecillo
APH (Patriotic Alliance)	7 Héctor Adán Almendarez Vásquez	8 Marylu Troncony Castillo	9 Oscar Edgardo Rodríguez Gómez
PL (Liberal Party)	10; Manuel de Jesús Velásquez Flores	11; Manuel Iván Fiallos Rodas	12; María del Carmen Urquía Martínez
PAC (Anti-Corruption Party)	13; Fernanda López Pérez	14; José Ramón Morales Burdett	15; María Enecon Perdomo Gómez
LIBRE (Liberty & Refoundation)	16; Abel Benítez	17; Miriam Elizabeth Pérez Zelaya	18; Santos Victorino Rodríguez Yanes
FAPER (Political Broad Front in Resistance)	19; Roger Emilio Medina Ramos	20; Oscar Rolando Melghem Dueñas	21; Glenis Laritza López Velásquez
PINU (Innovation and Unity Party)	22; Francisco Vásquez	23; Cándida Pérez	24; Sandra Lorena Argueta Ventura
PN (National Party)	25; Gladia Aurora López Calderón	26; Policarpo Bonilla Pinel	27; Raúl Edgardo Bulnes Barahona

== Lempira ==
Lempira (6 MPs)
UD (Democratic Unification)	1 Teodoro Díaz Bautista	2 Marino Nataren Meléndez	3 Aracely Portillo Castillo
UD (Democratic Unification)	4 Zonia Maibeli Díaz Landaverde	5 Blanca Rosa Guardado López	
DC (Christian Democracy)	6 Nely Ondina Martínez	7 José David Carrasco	8 María Lucinda Reyes Portillo
DC (Christian Democracy)	9 Moisés Urias Melgar Guardado	10; José Alexander Mateo López	
APH (Patriotic Alliance)	11; Marcos Leopoldo Hernández	12; Gilma Patricia Rivas	13; Juán José Reyes
APH (Patriotic Alliance)	14; Sulema Josefina Escalante Gómez	15; Alex Eduardo Menjívar Paz	
PL (Liberal Party)	16; Erick Mauricio Rodríguez	17; Nery Orlando Reyes Hernández	18; Edgar Kinett Zacapa López
PL (Liberal Party)	19; Leodegario Mateo García	20; Yolanda Pamela Borjas Aplicano	
PAC (Anti-Corruption Party)	21; Betulia Ruiz Mejía	22; Jesús Hernán Cruz Pérez	23; Doreen Esther Flores Orellana
PAC (Anti-Corruption Party)	24; Olga Floribel Aragón Posadas	25; Edwin Bery Cruz Mejía	
LIBRE (Liberty & Refoundation)	26; Yester Omar Muñoz	27; Lily Aguilar Madrid	28; Ryna Marisol Vásquez Sánchez
LIBRE (Liberty & Refoundation)	29; Licida Leonor Borjas Hercúles	30; Víctor Manuel Cruz Sánchez	
FAPER (Political Broad Front in Resistance)	31; Delmi Yaneth Castellanos Lorenzo	32; César Darío Meza Padilla	33; Pastora Villanueva Orellana
FAPER (Political Broad Front in Resistance)	34; Abel de Jesús Iraheta Cantarero	35; Noé Alejandro Perdomo Paz	
PINU (Innovation and Unity Party)	36; Karen Yameli García Murillo	37; Loorbin Oralia Hernández Aguilar	38; Héctor Armando Martínez Reyes
PINU (Innovation and Unity Party)	39; María Santos Licona	40; Cándido Dubón Ramírez	
PN (National Party)	41; Juan Carlos Valenzuela	42; Salvador Valeriano Pineda	43; Samuel Armando Reyes Rendón
PN (National Party)	44; Edna Yolani Batres	45; Yesenia Soledad Gómez Alvarenga	

== Ocotepeque ==
Ocotepeque (2 MPs)
UD (Democratic Unification)	1 Cesia Keren Santos Rivera
UD (Democratic Unification)	2 Paim González Pérez
DC (Christian Democracy)	3 José Alexis Miranda Hernández
DC (Christian Democracy)	4 Fany Marisol Valle Valle
APH (Patriotic Alliance)	5 Rafael Antonio Peraza Guerra
APH (Patriotic Alliance)	6 Elva Guadalupe Pineda Fuentes
PL (Liberal Party)	7 Hugo Ricardo Hernández
PL (Liberal Party)	8 Sandra Amparo Arita López
PAC (Anti-Corruption Party)	9 Nancy Marilú Lemuz Solorzano
PAC (Anti-Corruption Party)	10; Julio Alberto Tinoco Espinoza
LIBRE (Liberty & Refoundation)	11; Oscar Orlando Cáceres Ruíz
LIBRE (Liberty & Refoundation)	12; María del Tránsito Lara
FAPER (Political Broad Front in Resistance)	13; Martha Lidia Hercúles Arana
FAPER (Political Broad Front in Resistance)	14; Víctor Manuel Chinchilla Valle
PINU (Innovation and Unity Party)	15; Luis Alfonso Jiménez Escobar
PINU (Innovation and Unity Party)	16; Iris Marisol López González
PN (National Party)	17; Román Villeda Aguilar
PN (National Party)	18; Valencita Odalis Leverón Rosa

== Olancho ==
Olancho (7 MPs)
UD (Democratic Unification)	1 Marcos Ramiro Lobo Rosales	2 Juán Alberto Rodríguez Mercadal	3 Liliana Concepción Medina Ayala	4 Rossel Lorenzo Argueta Tejeda
UD (Democratic Unification)	5 Karla Maribel Alemán Mejía	6 Amalia Yaneth Inestroza	7 Walter Manrrique Juárez Hernández	
DC (Christian Democracy)	8 Flavio Javier Nájera Zelaya	9 Nora Betina Rodríguez Cáceres	10; Mirna Araceli Padilla Mencía	11; Lorenza del Carmen Aguilar Galeano
DC (Christian Democracy)	12; Erlin Antonio Hernándes	13; Fredy Alberto Ordóñez Romero	14; Bernardo Abraham Cubas	
APH (Patriotic Alliance)	15; Tulio Favián Zelaya Lobo	16; Héctor Oquelí Sarmiento	17; Alex David Sandoval Sabonge	18; Leticia Carolina Madrid
APH (Patriotic Alliance)	19; Tania Iveth Romero Lobo	20; Lindolfo Rafael Godoy	21; Yesy Marisela Pagoada Villafranca	
PL (Liberal Party)	22; Fredy Renán Nájera	23; Elman Joel Sandoval	24; Luis Beltrán Irías Laínez	25; Milton Mateo Montalván Mejía
PL (Liberal Party)	26; Justo Renán Martínez Miralda	27; Sifred Eugenio Brown Méndez	28; Oscar Rolando Flores Pinot	
PAC (Anti-Corruption Party)	29; Oscar Samuel Alemán Gutiérrez	30; Diana Maribel Hernández Blandín	31; Osman Roney Banegas Ruiz	32; Norma Sagrario Rivera Ferrera
PAC (Anti-Corruption Party)	33; Blanca Rosa Rivera Ferrera	34; Enma Mariela Rojas Pacheco	35; Jorge Leonardo Casco Mendoza	
LIBRE (Liberty & Refoundation)	36; José Manuel Zelaya Rosales	37; Miguel Ángel Navarro Cruz	38; Mario Alexander Ayala Turcios	39; José Salvador Arnodo Mercado
LIBRE (Liberty & Refoundation)	40; José Ramón Caballero Fajardo	41; Yadira Floribeth Álvarez Licona	42; Mario Arturo Padilla Mendoza	
FAPER (Political Broad Front in Resistance)	43; Yonary Lizeth Yánez	44; Milton Augusto Hernández Andrade	45; Luis Fernando Hernández Mateo	46; Ledis Fabiola Ortíz Fúnez
FAPER (Political Broad Front in Resistance)	47; Manuel Alexis Rodríguez Banegas	48; Héctor Luis Rubio Artica	49; Eda Argentina Bonilla Barralaga	
PINU (Innovation and Unity Party)	50; Omar Isaías Pacheco Tejeda	51; Óscar Bilmer Salazar Rivera	52; María Isabel García López	53; Andrés Eduardo Hernández
PINU (Innovation and Unity Party)	54; Yolani Albertina Talavera Cruz	55; Denis Enrique Rosales Murillo	56; Sindi Carolina Valdez Matute	
PN (National Party)	57; Reinaldo Antonio Sánchez	58; Teresa Concepción Cálix Raudales	59; José Francisco Rivera Hernández	60; Santos Ernesto Cálix Molina
PN (National Party)	61; María Dolores García Guifarro	62; Gilliam Guifarro Montes de Oca	63; Dennis Lizandro Mejía Zelaya	

== Santa Bárbara ==
Santa Bárbara (9 MPs)
UD (Democratic Unification)	1 Sergio Arturo Castellanos	2 Oscar Humberto Mejía Hernández	3 José Ramón Gómez	4 Idania Yadira Rodríguez	
UD (Democratic Unification)	5 María Teresa Sabillón Turcios	6 Coronado Gómez Izaguirre	7 Lily May Oliver	8 Liduvina Perdomo Castellanos	9 Blanca Suyapa Membreño Matute
DC (Christian Democracy)	10; Raúl Alberto Hernández Rivera	11; Argentina García	12; Edin Armando Rodríguez	13; Rafael Paz Deras	
DC (Christian Democracy)	14; Indira Isabel Delattibodier	15; Valentín Benítez Banegas	16; Juventina Rodríguez	17; Yanida Navidad Reyes Toro	18; Marlyn Gicela López Dubón
APH (Patriotic Alliance)	19; Celenia María Borjas	20; Carlos José Banegas	21; Oscar Orlando Guzmán Bennett	22; Glenda Arely Alonzo	
APH (Patriotic Alliance)	23; Pastora Madrid García	24; Flora Idalma López Vallecillo	25; Jesús Guillermo Alonzo Trejo	26; Osvaldo Omar Caballero Rápalo	27; Luis Guillermo Rivera Medrano
PL (Liberal Party)	28; Víctor Rolando Sabillón	29; Jesús Dagoberto Perdomo	30; Juan Carlos Enamorado Alcántara	31; Sonia Argentina Fajardo Regalado	
PL (Liberal Party)	32; Mirna Angélica Cardona Rivera	33; Rommel Caballero Mejía	34; Rina Cecilia Barahona Jerezano	35; Marco Tulio Muñoz López	36; Luis Edgardo Murillo Pineda
PAC (Anti-Corruption Party)	37; Teodocio Paz	38; Gloria Yasmín Meza	39; Merlin Nohe Escobar Hernández	40; José Adalid Rivera Paz	
PAC (Anti-Corruption Party)	41; Leonel Ayala Flores	42; José María Perdomo Ulloa	43; Alma Azucena Teruel	44; Kenia Maricela López	45; Florentina Reyes Herrera
LIBRE (Liberty & Refoundation)	46; Edgardo Antonio Casaña Mejía	47; Dennys Antonio Sánchez Fernández	48; Jorge Enoc Flores	49; Carlos Alberto Interiano	
LIBRE (Liberty & Refoundation)	50; José Ramón Amaya Caballero	51; Ramón Enrique Romero García	52; Alejandra María Mancia	53; Oscar Elvir Mendoza Rodríguez	54; Medardo Rosa Pineda
FAPER (Political Broad Front in Resistance)	55; Adalicia Cardona Ponce	56; José Ramón Vásquez Díaz	57; Digna Benítez Benítez	58; Jesús Baltazar Martínez Tróchez	
FAPER (Political Broad Front in Resistance)	59; Jerson Adalid Mejía Tróchez	60; María Enamorado	61; Medardo Isac Orellana Orellana	62; Ely Sonia Pineda Guardado	63; Angel María Herrera Sánchez
PN (National Party)	64; Rolando Dubón Bueso	65; Mario Alonso Pérez López	66; Martha Concepción Figueroa	67; César Enrique Handal Fernández	
PN (National Party)	68; Selma Yadira Silva Rodríguez	69; Claudio Roberto Perdomo	70; Carmen Alicia Fúnez Leiva	71; Nely Pineda Ayala	72; Dixie Roberto Ayala Mejía

- Innovation and Unity Party did not presented candidates

== Valle ==
Valle (4 MPs)
UD (Democratic Unification)	1 Lino Godínez	2 Roxana Gabriela Ramírez
UD (Democratic Unification)	3 Martir Eusebio Alvarado Izaguirre	4 Karla Patricia Aguilera
DC (Christian Democracy)	5 Carlos Humberto Manzanares Cabrera	6 Jisela Rosmery Godínez
DC (Christian Democracy)	7 Rodrigo Alexis Romero Villalobos	8 Flora Azucena Avila Matamoros
APH (Patriotic Alliance)	9 Erwin Gustavo Baquedano	10; Nancy Fabiola Maldonado Osorio
APH (Patriotic Alliance)	11; José Catalino Martínez García	12; Elva Noemy Manzanares Villatoro
PL (Liberal Party)	13; José Alfredo Saavedra	14; Jerónimo Arístides Gonzáles Hernández
PL (Liberal Party)	15; Elida Karina Reyes Posadas	16; Rosario Emperatris Carías
PAC (Anti-Corruption Party)	17; Bernabé Larios Villatoro	18; Ebesly Riabi Reyes Bustamante
PAC (Anti-Corruption Party)	19; Daniela Paola Flores Morales	20; Karen Lorena Lemus Berrios
LIBRE (Liberty & Refoundation)	21; Eleazar Alexander Juárez	22; Wilfredo Guevara Trujillo
LIBRE (Liberty & Refoundation)	23; Rony Javier Paz Reyes	24; Rony Cruz Castillo
PINU (Innovation and Unity Party)	25; Miguel Angel Talavera Cruz	26; Denis Amílcar Flores Ortíz
PINU (Innovation and Unity Party)	27; Lidia Yesenia Cruz Laínez	28; Francis Alejandra Linarez Gutiérrez
PN (National Party)	29; Tomás Zambrano	30; Luz Arely Valdez Meléndez
PN (National Party)	31; Marcos Antonio Velasquez	32; Ana Julia García Villalobos

- Political Broad Front in Resistance did not presented candidates.

== Yoro ==
Atlántida (8 MPs)
UD (Democratic Unification)	1 César Ham	2 Santos Paulino Cantillano	3 Hipólita Rodríguez	4 Héctor Darío Martínez	
UD (Democratic Unification)	5 Prisila Alvarado Euceda	6 Rafael Sibríán Guerra	7 Mirian Lizzeth Urbina Nájera	8 Marlon Edgardo Valeriano	9 Nérida Maritza Yánes Antúnez
DC (Christian Democracy)	10; Yadira Yamileth Reyes Cabrera	11; Francisco Javier Fúnez	12; Paola Elena Orellana	13; Denis Javier Cruz Martínez	
DC (Christian Democracy)	14; Doris Yanira Bautista Ortíz	15; Adán de Jesús Martínez Figueroa	16; Eva Rosario Martínez Sánchez	17; Juan Carlos Arita Licona	18; Juan Manuel Lagos Ortíz
APH (Patriotic Alliance)	19; Jerson Omar Velásquez Villatoro	20; Arlene Josaary Reaños Linares	21; Santos Faustino Padilla Figueroa	22; Miguel Angel García Fajardo	
APH (Patriotic Alliance)	23; Nelson David Leiva Banegas	24; Dilcia Rosibel López	25; Higda Amparo Andino Guevara	26; Evelyn Jeannete Archaga	27; Francisco Yalil Martínez Gabrie
PL (Liberal Party)	28; José Vivian Portillo	29; Maritza Janeth Varela Martínez	30; Delmi Graciela Rivera Guevara	31; Ricardo Arturo Cruz Navarro	
PL (Liberal Party)	32; María Luisa Pineda Hernández	33; Daniela Marquez Rivera	34; Roberto Antonio Orellana Velásquez	35; Sergio Armando Delgado	36; Enrique Orlando Cano Palma
PAC (Anti-Corruption Party)	37; Angel Roberto Rivera Pacheco	38; Jorge Adalid Díaz Martell	39; Denis Johan Collins Orellana	40; Liberato Madrid Castro	
PAC (Anti-Corruption Party)	41; Marlene Yesenia Izaguirre Vásquez	42; Fausto Ricardo Carías Mahchi	43; Eugenia Turcios García	44; Silvia Mariel Ponce Ferrufino	45; Claudia Lorena Flores López
LIBRE (Liberty & Refoundation)	46; Paula Crecencia Durán Soto	47; Bartolo Antonio Fuentes	48; Santos Alfonzo Vásquez Sánchez	49; Irma Aida Reyes Coello	
LIBRE (Liberty & Refoundation)	50; Danilo Alexander Tejada Murillo	51; Jairo Miguel Hernández	52; Mercedes Emilia Avila Panchamé	53; Ana Marlen Morales Reyes	54; Héctor Antonio Mejía
FAPER (Political Broad Front in Resistance)	55; Aydee Margoth Sandoval Mendoza	56; Gloria Elizabeth Caballero	57; Claudia Patricia Rosales Elías	58; Marvin Alexis Ramírez Juárez	
FAPER (Political Broad Front in Resistance)	59; José Omar Hernández	60; Jairo Roylan Mendoza Mejía	61; Lesly Amparo Echeverría Matamoros	62; Manuela del Carmen Maldonado Rodríguez	63; Sara Lizet Sorto Lorenzo
PINU (Innovation and Unity Party)	64; Rafael Sandoval Bardales	65; María Contreras Licona	66; Oscar Mardoqueo López Martínez	67; María del Carmen Bonilla Martínez	
PINU (Innovation and Unity Party)	68; Jorge Alberto Andino García	69; Blanca Aracely Matute Sánchez	70; Alejandro Gálvez Cano	71; María Marlenis Yánez Maldonado	72; José David Cruz Cruz
PN (National Party)	73; Diana Patricia Urbina	74; Milton Jesús Puerto	75; Ricardo Arturo Bermúdez Wills	76; Juan Carlos Molina Puerto	
PN (National Party)	77; Víctor Manuel Fonseca Flores	78; Jeffrey Alexander Flores	79; Óscar Remberto Hawit	80; Navil Enrique Hawit Valle	81; René Alfredo Chacón
