= List of members of the National Congress of Honduras, 2006–2010 =

This is a list of the 128 members of the National Congress of Honduras who were elected in the 2005 general election.

Name	Department	Party
Carlos Ramón Aguilar Guifarro	Colón	PN
Toribio Aguilera	Cortés	PINU
Manuel Antonio Alberto Zelaya	Copán	PL
Martha Lorena Alvarado	Francisco Morazán	PL
José Adolfo Alvarado	Copán	PN
Abraham Alvarenga	Lempira	PN
Elvia Josefina Amador	Olancho	PL
Marco Antonio Andino	Francisco Morazán	PL
Ana Rosa Andino	Francisco Morazán	PINU
Sadie Farid Andonie	Cortés	PL
Víctor Manuel Argeñal	Choluteca	PN
Juan de la Cruz Avelar	Comayagua	PL
Arnoldo José Avilés García	Francisco Morazán	PN
Silvia Ayala	Cortés	UD
José Azcona Bocock	Francisco Morazán	PL
Carlos Hernán Banegas	Colón	PL
Mario Alexander Barahona Martínez	Francisco Morazán	PN
Víctor Hugo Barnica	Copán	PN
Samuel Enrique Bográn	Cortés	PN
José Rosario Bonano	Atlántida	PL
Pompeyo Bonilla	La Paz	PN
Romualdo Bueso Melghem	Intibucá	PL
Oscar Orlando Burgos	Yoro	PN
Wilfredo Bustillo Castellanos	Comayagua	PN
Norma Haydee Calderón	Cortés	PL
Santos Mauricio Cálix	Atlántida	PN
Victoria Carrasco	Cortés	PN
Gladys Bernarda Casco	Choluteca	PN
Paola Castro Gómez	Comayagua	PN
Myrna Castro Rosales	Francisco Morazán	PL
Héctor Vidal Cerrato	Olancho	PL
Ramiro Adalid Chacón	El Paraíso	PL
Rigoberto Chang Castillo	Francisco Morazán	PN
María Teresa Chávez	El Paraíso	PN
José Sadi Contreras	Copán	PN
John Arnold Cook	Cortés	PL
Gladis Esmeralda del Cid	Cortés	PL
Ilsa Díaz Espinoza	Cortés	PN
Fabían Discua Carranza	Comayagua	PL
Celín Discua	El Paraíso	PN
Rolando Dubón Bueso	Santa Bárbara	PN
Edna Carolina Echeverría Haylock	Gracias a Dios	PL
Marcio René Espinal	Atlántida	PN
Marcia Facussé Andonie	Francisco Morazán	PL
Manuel Iván Fiallos	La Paz	PL
Martha Concepción Figueroa	Santa Bárbara	PN
Mary Elizabeth Flores	Francisco Morazán	PL
José Antonio Fuentes Posas	Atlántida	PL
Dario Gámez Panchamé	Cortés	PN
Miguel Ángel Gámez	Intibucá	PN
Gabriel García Ardón	Cortés	PN
Rubén Francisco García	Cortés	PL
Ana Julia García	Valle	PN
Gustavo Adolfo González	El Paraíso	PN
Ángel Antonio Guerra	Copán	PL
Elias Arnaldo Guevara	Lempira	PL
Adriana de Jesús Guevara	Choluteca	PL
Gillian Guifarro Montes de Oca	Olancho	PN
Doris Gutiérrez	Francisco Morazán	UD
Maria Felícita Guzmán	Comayagua	PL
Javier Francisco Hall	Yoro	PL
César Ham	Yoro	UD
Jorge Johnny Handal	Yoro	PN
Emil Hawitt	Yoro	PN
Ramón Hernández Alcerro	Francisco Morazán	PN
Juan Orlando Hernández	Lempira	PN
Mario Fernando Hernández	Cortés	PL
Lorena Enriqueta Herrera	Cortés	PN
José de la Paz Herrera	Francisco Morazán	PL
Jerry Dave Hynds	Islas de la Bahía	PL
Rodolfo Irias Navas	Atlántida	PN
Gabo Alfredo Jalil	Francisco Morazán	PL
Nelly Jeréz	Francisco Morazán	PN
Eleazar Alexander Juárez	Valle	PL
Carlos Gabriel Kattán	Cortés	PN
Wenceslao Lara Orellana	Cortés	PL
Carlos Alfredo Lara Watson	Choluteca	PL
José Arnulfo López	Yoro	PL
Luis Alonso Marcia	Choluteca	DC
Dayana Gisell Martínez	Francisco Morazán	PL
Aurelio Martinez	Atlántida	PL
David Matamoros Batson	Francisco Morazán	PN
Oscar Humberto Mejía	Santa Bárbara	UD
Ersy Sagot Mejía	Valle	PN
Felipe Nery Méndez	Choluteca	PL
Roberto Micheletti (President, 2006–09)	Yoro	PL
Arnulfo Jesús Miralda	Olancho	PL
Dario Alejandro Munguia	Atlántida	PN
Oscar Ramón Nájera	Colón	PN
Mauricio Oliva	Choluteca	PN
Edmundo Orellana	Francisco Morazán	PL
Ángel Alfonso Paz López	Santa Bárbara	PN
Marleny Beatriz Paz	Cortés	DC
José Neftalí Pérez	Lempira	PN
Marvin Ponce	Francisco Morazán	UD
Milton Jesús Puerto	Yoro	PN
Roger Arquimedes Quiroz	Choluteca	PN
Donaldo Ernesto Reyes	Santa Bárbara	PN
Antonio Rivera Callejas	Francisco Morazán	PN
Juan Ángel Rivera Tábora	Yoro	PL
Blanca Edith Rivera	Choluteca	PL
Gonzálo Antonio Rivera	Atlántida	PL
Maria de la Paz Rivera	Santa Bárbara	PL
Erick Mauricio Rodríguez	Lempira	PL
Ricardo Rodríguez	El Paraíso	PL
Elisa Cristina Ruíz	Comayagua	PN
José Alfredo Saavedra (Acting President, 2009–10)	Valle	PL
José Ángel Saavedra Posadas	Copán	PL
Santiago Sabillón Madrid	Santa Bárbara	PL
Víctor Rolando Sabillón	Santa Bárbara	PL
Juán Ramón Salgado	Colón	PL
Reinaldo Antonio Sánchez	Olancho	PN
Luis Rigoberto Santos	Ococtepeque	PL
Julio Edgardo Sarmiento	Olancho	PN
Mario Edgardo Segura	El Paraíso	PL
Orle Solís	Olancho	DC
Valentín Suárez Osejo	Comayagua	PL
José Rodrigo Trochez	Santa Bárbara	PL
Roland Valenzuela	Cortés	PL
Elvia Argentina Valle	Copán	PL
Elden Vásquez	Intibucá	PN
Manuel de Jesús Velásquez	La Paz	PL
Ramón Velásquez Názar	Francisco Morazán	DC
Víctor Hugo Ventura	Ococtepeque	PN
José Rodolfo Zelaya	Francisco Morazán	PN
Maria Margarita Zelaya	Cortés	PL
Adela Elizabeth Zúniga	Francisco Morazán	PN
