= Aroca =

Aroca is a surname of Basque origins. Notable people with the surname include:

- Fuensanta Aroca, Spanish mathematician
- Miriam Díaz Aroca (born 1962), Spanish actress
- Mario Edgardo Segura Aroca (born 1966), Honduran engineer and politician
