= Inestroza =

Inestroza is a surname. Notable people with the surname include:

- Francisco Inestroza, Honduran politician and President of Honduras
- Renan Inestroza (born 1965), Honduran politician

== See also ==
- Inostroza
