= Erick Rodríguez =

Erick Rodríguez may refer to:

- Erick Rodríguez (footballer) (born 1968), Costa Rican footballer
- Erick Mauricio Rodríguez (born 1968), Honduran lawyer and politician
- Erick Rodríguez Steller (born 1969), Costa Rican politician
- Erick Rodríguez (runner) (born 1990), Nicaraguan middle distance runner

== See also ==
- Eric Rodriguez (disambiguation)
