= Nájera (surname) =

Nájera is a surname. Notable people with the surname include:

- Antonio Vallejo-Nájera (1889–1960), Spanish psychiatrist
- Ariel Castillo Nájera (born 1955), Mexican politician
- Carlos Antonio Reyes Nájera (born 1961), Guatemalan chess player
- Eduardo Nájera (born 1976), Mexican basketball player
- Elda Luna-Nájera, American social worker and politician
- Elisa Nájera (born 1986), Mexican TV host, model and beauty pageant titleholder
- Francisco Nájera (born 1983), Colombian footballer
- Fredy Renán Nájera (born 1977), Honduran politician
- José Manuel Nájera (born 1988), Colombian footballer
- Juan Carlos Nájera (born 1981), Guatemalan triple jumper and coach
- Lourdes Gutiérrez Nájera, American cultural anthropologist
- Manuel Nájera (born 1952), Mexican footballer
- Manuel Gutiérrez Nájera (1859–1895), Mexican writer and political figure
- Maricruz Nájera, Mexican actress
- Oscar Ramón Nájera (born 1950), Honduran politician
- Pedro Nájera (1929–2020), Mexican footballer
- Rosa María Avilés Nájera (born 1951), Mexican politician
- Rossana Nájera (born 1980), Mexican actress
