= Nora Ruvalcaba =

Mexican politician

Nora Ruvalcaba Gámez

Coordinator of the Development Programs of the State of Aguascalientes
- In office 2 September 2021 – 1 January 2022
- Preceded by: Aldo Ruíz Sánchez
- Succeeded by: Silvia Licon Davila

Deputy of the Congress of Aguascalientes by Proportional representation
- In office 15 November 2007 – 6 March 2010
- Succeeded by: Guillermo Román Esqueda

Councilor of Aguascalientes Municipality
- In office 1 January 2002 – 31 December 2004

Personal details
- Born: 8 August 1967 (age 59) Pabellón de Arteaga, Aguascalientes, Mexico
- Party: PRD (1997–2014); MORENA (from 2014)
- Education: Autonomous University of Aguascalientes
- Occupation: Politician, teacher, lawyer

Nora Ruvalcaba Gámez (Note: In this Mexican name, the surname is Ruvalcaba and the second or maternal family name is Gámez.) (born 8 August 1967) is a Mexican educator and politician who is member of the National Regeneration Movement (Morena). She served as the party's first state president in Aguascalientes (2012–2015).

On 31 August 2021, she served as State Delegate of the Programs for the Development of the State of Aguascalientes, a position she left on 7 January 2022 to contend for the government of the state of Aguascalientes representing MORENA.

She has served as councilor in the Aguascalientes municipal government (2002–2004) and local deputy in the Congress of Aguascalientes (2007–2010).

== Career path ==
=== Education ===
Ruvalcaba studied at the Normal School of Aguascalientes and graduated with a degree in primary education. After her, she completed her studies at the Escuela Normal Superior, this time in social sciences. She finally obtained a third degree, at the Autonomous University of Aguascalientes as a law graduate with a specialty in constitutional law.

== Political career ==
She began her political career within the Party of the Democratic Revolution (1997–2012), she was president of the Municipal Executive Committee in Aguascalientes (1997–2000), General Secretary of the State Executive Committee (2005–2007) and finally national councilor (2007–2010). She was councilor of the Town Hall of Municipality of Aguascalientes (2002–2004) and local deputy in the Sixtieth Legislature corresponding to the period 2007–2010. In 2010 she ran as a candidate for governor of Aguascalientes for the Party of the Democratic Revolution. In 2012 she was the founder of the National Regeneration Movement (Morena) in Aguascalientes and in 2016 she was Morena's candidate for governor, when she obtained fourth place with 3.18% of the vote. In addition, she was a candidate for federal deputy for Aguascalientes 3rd district in the federal elections of 2015. She was the delegate of Programs for the Development of the State of Aguascalientes.

Ruvalcaba Gámez won election as Aguascalientes's third senator in the 2024 Senate election, occupying the first place on the Sigamos Haciendo Historia coalition's two-name formula.

On 25 August 2026, she was announced as Morena's "state coordinator for the defence of the transformation and national sovereignty", in which capacity she is expected to represent the party in the Aguascalientes gubernatorial election of 6 June 2027.
