= Mario Pérez =

Mario Pérez may refer to:

- Mario Perez (artist) (born 1943), Cuban artist
- Mario Pérez (footballer, born 1927), Mexican midfielder
- Mario Pérez (footballer, born 1946), Mexican defender
- Mario Pérez (footballer, born 1982), Mexican footballer
- Mario Alonso Pérez López (born 1975), Honduran politician
- Mario Gaspar Pérez (born 1990), Spanish footballer for Villarreal CF
- Mario Pérez de Arce (1917-2010), Chilean architect
- Mario Pérez Saldívar (born 1939), Mexican long-distance runner
- Mario Pérez Zúñiga (born 1982), Mexican footballer
