= Gamez =

Gamez or Gámez is a Spanish-language surname. Notable people with the name include:

- Ana Patricia Gámez (born 1987), Mexican beauty queen
- Blanca Amelia Gámez (born 1950), Mexican politician
- Celia Gámez (1905–1992), Argentine actress and dancer
- Eduardo Gámez (born 1991), professional Mexican footballer
- Elisbet Gámez (born 1997), Cuban swimmer
- Enrique Gámez (born 1981), Ecuadorian footballer
- Fran Gámez (born 1991), Spanish footballer
- Francisca Rubio Gámez (born 1949), aka Fanny Rubio, Spanish professor and writer
- Horacio Zevallos Gámez (1943–1984), Peruvian professor and founder of SUTEP
- Jesús Gámez (born 1985), Spanish professional footballer
- José Luis Íñiguez Gámez (born 1978), a Mexican politician from the National Action Party
- Juan de Alfaro y Gámez (1610–1680), Spanish Baroque painter
- Juan José Gámez (1939–1997), Costa Rican football player and manager
- Julio César Gámez Interiano (born 1955), Honduran politician
- Leo Gámez, Silvio Rafael Gamez, (born 1963), Venezuelan boxer
- Máximo Gámez (born 1989), Nicaraguan professional defender
- Melani Bergés Gámez (born 1990), blind Spanish Paralympic athlete
- Miguel Ángel Gámez (born 1954), Honduran politician
- Óscar Serrano Gámez (born 1978), known as Óscar Serrano, former Spanish professional male tennis player
- Rafael Muino Gamez (born 1975), known as Rafael Muiño, Spanish wheelchair basketball player
- Robert Gamez (born 1968), American professional golfer
- Roberto Gámez Panchamé (born 1950), Honduran veterinarian and politician
- Victoria Gamez (1923–2005), Spanish operatic lyric soprano and recitalist
