= Donaldo =

Donaldo is a male given name. Notable people with the name include:

- Donaldo Arza (1946–), Panamanian track and field athlete
- Donaldo Açka (1997–), Greek-Albanian footballer
- Luis Donaldo Colosio Murrieta (1950–1996), Mexican politician
- Luis Donaldo Colosio Riojas (1985–), Mexican politician
- Donaldo "Dennis" Farina (1944–2013), American actor
- Donaldo González (1971–), Panamanian footballer
- Luis Donaldo Hernández (1998–), Mexican footballer
- Donaldo "Dondon" Hontiveros (1977–), Filipino politician
- Donaldo Macedo (1950–), Cape Verdean-American academic
- Donaldo Méndez (1978–), Venezuelan baseball player
- Donaldo Morales (1982–), Honduran footballer
- Donaldo Ortiz Colín (1961–), Mexican politician
- Luis Donaldo Pineda (1992–), Mexican footballer
- Donaldo Ernesto Reyes (1939–), Honduran lawyer and politician
- Donaldo Ross (1904–1972), Uruguayan footballer

== See also ==
- Donald
- Donald (disambiguation)
