= Brenda Flores =

Brenda Flores may refer to:

- Brenda Flores (runner) (born 1991), Mexican long-distance runner
- Brenda Mercedes Flores (born 1969), Honduran politician
- Brenda "La Bonita" Flores (born 1992), Mexican boxer
