= Argueta =

Argueta is a Spanish-language surname. People with the surname include:

- Jorge Argueta, Salvadorian award-winning poet and author
- Luis Argueta (born 1946), Guatemalan film director and producer
- Manlio Argueta (born 1935), Salvadoran writer, critic, and novelist
- Rony Argueta (born 1991), American soccer player
- Sadia Argueta (born 1984), Honduran politician
- Virginia Argueta (born 1994), Guatemalan model and beauty pageant titleholder
- Manuel Colom Argueta (1932–1979), Guatemalan politician and mayor of Guatemala City
- Darvis Argueta (born 1996), Honduran footballer
