= Juan Valenzuela =

Juan Valenzuela may refer to:

- Juan Bautista Valenzuela Velázquez (1574–1645), Spanish jurist
- Juan Carlos Valenzuela (footballer) (born 1984), Mexican footballer
- Juan Carlos Valenzuela (politician) (born 1970), Honduran politician
- Juan de Dios Valenzuela (born 1889), Chilean businessman and politician
- Juan Marcelo Valenzuela (fl. 2020s), Chilean politician
