= Elvia (name) =

Elvia is a given name or surname. Notable people with the name include:

== Given name ==
- Elvia Allman (1904–1992), American actress
- Elvia Alvarado (born 1938), Honduran human rights activist
- Elvia Josefina Amador (born 1948), Honduran politician
- Elvia Andreoli (1950–2020), Argentine actress
- Elvia Violeta Menjívar (born 1952), Salvadoran politician
- Elvia María Pérez (born 1954), Mexican politician
- María Elvia Amaya Araujo (1954–2012), Mexican politician
- Elvia Reyes (born 1956), Honduran fencer
- Elvia Hernández García (born 1962), Mexican politician
- Elvia Ardalani (born 1963), Mexican writer

== Surname ==
- Anna Maria Elvia (1713–1784), Swedish feminist writer
