= Elvia =

Elvia may refer to:

- Elvia (name)
- Elvia (moth), a genus of moths in the family Geometridae
