= José Juan (given name) =

José Juan is a Spanish given name. Notable people with this name include:

- José Juan Arrom (1910–2007), Spanish professor and scholar of Latin American culture
- José Juan Bárcenas (born 1961), Mexican politician
- José Juan Barea (born 1984), Puerto Rican basketball coach
- José Juan Bautista Pampuro (1949–2021), Argentine politician
- José Juan Cotto (born 1977), Puerto Rican retired professional boxer
- José Juan Figueiras (born 1979), Spanish professional footballer
- José Juan García (1940–2002), the founder of the international drug-rehabilitation institution Hogar CREA
- José Juan Luque (born 1977), Spanish footballer
- José Juan Macías (born 1999), Mexican former professional footballer
- José Juan Martínez Gómez (born 1957), criminal and hostage taker
- José Juan Navarro (born 1981), Spanish weightlifter
- José Juan Rivera Ramos (born 1970), Honduran politician
- José Juan Romero (born 1974), Spanish professional football manager
- José Juan Santesteban (1809–1884), Basque composer
- José Juan Tablada (1871–1945), Mexican poet, art critic, and diplomat
- José Juan Vázquez (born 1988), Mexican former professional footballer

== See also ==
- Juan José (given name)
- José Juan Almeyra, a village in Navarro Partido, Buenos Aires Province, Argentina
