= Interiano =

Interiano is a surname. Notable people with the surname include:

- Giorgio Interiano (fl. 15th century), Italian traveler, historian and ethnographer
- Julio César Gámez Interiano (born 1955), Honduran politician
- Maity Interiano (born 1985), American journalist
