= Miguel Edgardo Martínez =

Honduran politician

Miguel Edgardo Martínez Pineda (born 12 August 1965) is a Honduran politician. He currently serves as deputy of the National Congress of Honduras representing the National Party of Honduras for Comayagua.
