= Oscar Kilgore =

Honduran politician

Oscar Kilgore is a Honduran journalist and National Party of Honduras politician and former Mayor of San Pedro Sula (2002–2006). He was imprisoned in 2008 for abuse of authority and corruption relating to a loan he received while Mayor. Kilgore was sentenced to three years in prison on the 24th of October, 2017, for abuse of authority due to a $20,000,000 donation made to a church to build a psychiatric hospital. He was later acquitted of these charges. In 2021, Kilgore was found guilty of charges involving 140 purchase orders totaling over one million lempiras to a restaurant owned by the wife of the city's general manager. As of 2021, Kilgore had had 12 trials against him.

Preceded by Roberto Larios Silva	Mayor of San Pedro Sula; 2002-2006	Succeeded by Rodolfo Padilla Sunseri
