= Carolina Echeverría =

Honduran politician (1960–2021)

Edna Carolina Echeverría Haylock (1960 or 1961 in Gracias a Dios Department— July 25, 2021 in Tegucigalpa) was a Honduran politician.

A member of the Partido Liberal de Honduras, Echeverría represented Gracias a Dios Department in the National Congress of Honduras from 2006 to 2010, and was assassinated in 2021 while running for a second term.

The assassination took place at her home in the Tegucigalpa neighborhood of Lomas de Mayab; the killers gained access by posing as medical personnel and saying that they had come for COVID-19-related reasons. Radio America reported that a price of a million Honduran lempiras was paid in connection with the killing.

As of December 2023, three people had been charged with involvement in her murder, and two had been convicted.

== Family ==
Echeverría's daughter is Erika Urtecho, who took her place on the ballot after the assassination and was elected.
