= Carlos Gabriel Kattán =

Honduran politician

Carlos Gabriel Kattán Salem (born 17 September 1957) is a Honduran economist, businessman and politician. He served as deputy of the National Congress of Honduras representing the National Party of Honduras for Cortés during the 2006-2010 period.

He also served as member of the National Commission of Energy during 2010.
