= Juan Fernando Lobo =

Honduran politician

Juan Fernando Lobo Pineda (born 31 January 1973 in Tegucigalpa) is a Honduran publicist, television host and politician, currently acts as deputy of the National Congress of Honduras representing the National Party for Francisco Morazán. He is nephew of the President Porfirio Lobo Sosa.

He started his television career in 2002 hosting the variety program Radicales in Canal 11. Later the program moved to Canal 6 where he stayed until 2009, when he was elected as deputy.
