= Olman Danery Maldonado =

Honduran lawyer and politician

Olman Danery Maldonado Rubio (born 5 April 1966) is a Honduran lawyer and politician. He currently serves as deputy of the National Congress of Honduras representing the Liberal Party of Honduras for Comayagua.
