= Adela Elizabeth Zúñiga =

Honduran politician (born 1942)

Adela Elizabeth Zúñiga Morazán (born 4 February 1942) is a Honduran politician. She served as deputy of the National Congress of Honduras representing the National Party of Honduras for the Cortés Department during the 2006–2010 term.
