= Inostroza =

Inostroza is a surname. Notable people with the surname include:

- Benjamín Inostroza (born 1997), Chilean footballer
- Diego Inostroza (born 1992), Chilean footballer
- Eddio Inostroza (born 1946), Chilean footballer
- Enrique Inostroza (1921–2006), Chilean marathon runner
- Jesús Inostroza (born 1956), Chilean photographer
- Juan Inostroza (1942–1989), Chilean fencer
- Paris Inostroza (born 1972), Chilean fencer
- Raúl Inostroza (1921–1975), Chilean long-distance runner
