= Manuel Antonio Alberto Zelaya =

Honduran politician

Manuel Antonio Alberto Zelaya (born November 27, 1958) is a Honduran politician. A member of the Liberal Party of Honduras, he represented the Copán Department as a deputy of the National Congress of Honduras for 2006–2010.
