= Eric Rodriguez =

Eric Rodriguez may refer to:

- Erick Rodríguez (born 1991), Nicaraguan middle-distance runner
- Eric Rodriguez (basketball) (born 1981), Filipino basketball player
- Erick Mauricio Rodríguez (born 1968), Honduran lawyer and politician
