= Teófilo Enamorado =

Honduran politician

José Teófilo Enamorado Cárcamo (born 27 April 1963) is a Honduran politician. He currently serves in the Secretaria de Educacion as a deputy of the National Congress of Honduras, representing the Liberal Party of Honduras in Lempira. He is married to Isvela Sorto, and is the father of four children, Josue, Cesar, Elian, and Daniel.
