= Eduardo Bueso =

Honduran politician

Eduardo Bueso was the acting mayor of San Pedro Sula from June 28, 2009 until January 27, 2010. He is a member of the Liberal Party of Honduras.

Political offices
Preceded by Rodolfo Padilla Sunseri	Mayor of San Pedro Sula; 2009–2010 (Acting)	Succeeded by Juan Carlos Zuniga
