= José Adolfo Alvarado Lara =

Honduran politician

José Adolfo Alvarado Lara (born May 15, 1945) is a Honduran politician. A member of the National Party of Honduras, he represents the Copan Department and is a deputy of the National Congress of Honduras for 2006–2010.
