= Lisandro Mauricio Arias =

Honduran politician

Lisandro Mauricio Arias (born 12 April 1965 in Santa Rosa de Copán) is a Honduran politician. He currently serves as deputy of the National Congress of Honduras representing the Liberal Party of Honduras for Copán He was also mayor of Copan Ruinas during tow periods the 2002-2006 and the 2006–2010 period. He is married to Maru Aviles. In the elections of 2013 he returned to win his second term as being deputy.
