= Mario Fernando Hernández =

Honduran politician

Mario Fernando Hernández Bonilla (7 December 1966 – 22 November 2008) was a Liberal Party congressman for the Cortés Department in Honduras from January 2006 until his assassination. He was secretary for the legislative committee on Industry and Commerce and the legislative committee on Drug Trafficking and Security and was also a member of the legislative committee for Peace and Democracy. In addition he acted as alternative vice president (speaker) of Congress. He had a degree in business administration at University of San Pedro Sula.

== Death ==
Hernández was shot dead on 22 November 2008 in San Pedro Sula along with two of his colleagues while on his way to a meeting with activists in the Cabañas neighbourhood. He was an important supporter of Liberal presidential candidate Roberto Micheletti.
