= Jorge Elvir =

Honduran politician

Jorge Alberto Elvir Cruz is a Honduran politician. Elvir was elected to the National Congress of Honduras in the 2009 general election, as a Christian Democratic Party of Honduras (DC) candidate from Atlantida. Elvir obtained 4,830 votes (4.9% of the valid votes in the constituency). He alternate deputy was Aldo Farin Acosta Sarmiento. In the parliament Elvir was part of the commission that prepared the proposal for constitutional reform to allow the setting up of 'model cities'.

When the DC parliamentary group suffered an internal conflict in early 2011, Elvir was put forth as a candidate for group leader (supported by three out of five DC deputies).

In August 2013 Elvir tabled a parliamentary motion seeking to reform article 321 of the Honduras Penal Code, the article that outlaws discrimination against the LGBT community. According to Elvir, article 321 contravenes freedom of religion.

Elvir is a candidate of DC for deputy from Atlantida in the 2013 general election.
