= Romualdo Bueso Melghem =

Honduran politician (born 1947)

Romualdo Bueso Melghem (born 9 October 1947) is a Honduran politician. He served as deputy of the National Congress of Honduras representing the Liberal Party of Honduras for Intibucá during the 2006–10 period.
