= José Rosario Bonano =

Honduran politician

José Rosario Bonano (born 14 March 1956) is a Honduran politician. He served as deputy of the National Congress of Honduras representing the Liberal Party of Honduras for Atlántida during the 2006–2010 term.

During the government of Manuel Zelaya he was appointed to be Minister of the Secretary of Public Works, Transport and Housing.
