= Gladis Aurora López Calderón =

Honduran politician (born 1960)

6th Vice President of the National Congress of Honduras
- Incumbent
- Assumed office 25 January 2018

Deputy of the La Paz Department
- Incumbent
- Assumed office 25 January 2010

Personal details
- Born: 25 January 1960 (age 66) Marcala, Honduras
- Party: National Party
- Spouse: Arnold Castro
- Profession: Politician

Gladis Aurora López Calderón (born 25 January 1960) is a Honduran politician. She is currently the sixth vice president of the National Congress of Honduras. She served as President of the Central Executive Committee of the National Party between 2014 and 2017.

== Biography ==
Her spent her childhood with her parents and five brothers and sisters, all of whom grew up in the municipality of Marcala. López attended high school at the Anna D. Betchold Evangelical School in San Pedro Sula, achieving her title of Bilingual Secretary, she continued with her Bachelor of Tourism studies at LaSalle College in Canada in 1980.

== Attack outside the National Congress ==
On 8 January 2026, López was injured outside the Honduras National Congress in Tegucigalpa when an unknown assailant hurled a homemade explosive device at a group of lawmakers, striking her in the head before detonating. López suffered visible injuries to her back and was treated by medical personnel at the scene. The attack underscored the volatile atmosphere gripping the country in the aftermath of its disputed presidential election.

== Personal life ==
After returning to Honduras, she worked for Tan-Sahsa and later at the El Cajón hydroelectric plant. She and her husband, Arnold Castro, had three daughters: Ana Lucía, Gracia María, and Megan. Her daughter Gracia María Castro López was kidnapped in August 2008 and later found dead in Milpa Grande, south of Tegucigalpa.
