= José Tomás Ponce =

Honduran politician

José Tomás Ponce Rosas (born 1 July 1952) is a Honduran politician. In 2009 he was elected to represent the Yoro Department as a deputy in the 2010–2014 session of the National Congress of Honduras, representing the Liberal Party of Honduras.
