= Felipe Zúniga del Cid =

Honduran politician

Felipe Zúniga del Cid (born 27 April 1948) is a Honduran politician. He currently serves as deputy of the National Congress of Honduras representing the Liberal Party of Honduras for Intibucá.
