= Selvin Laínez =

Honduran politician

Selvin Efraín Laínez Sevilla (born 1983) is a Honduran politician. He currently serves as deputy of the National Congress of Honduras representing the Liberal Party of Honduras for Yoro.
