= Juan Francisco Argeñal =

Honduran politician (born 1954)

Juan Francisco Argeñal Espinal (born 21 January 1954 in Choluteca) is a Honduran politician. He currently serves as deputy of the National Congress of Honduras representing the National Party of Honduras for Choluteca.
