= Armando Calidonio =

Honduran politician

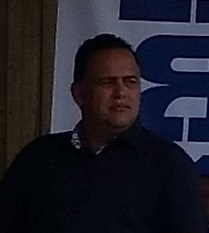
- Image of Armando Calidonio

Mayor of San Pedro Sula
- In office 25 January 2014 – 25 January 2022
- Preceded by: Juan Carlos Zuniga
- Succeeded by: Roberto Contreras

Deputy for Cortés
- In office 25 January 2010 – September 2011

Personal details
- Born: 19 September 1969 (age 56) Tegucigalpa, Honduras
- Party: National Party of Honduras
- Spouse: Karen Stechmann
- Profession: Agricultural engineer

Armando Calidonio Alvarado (born 19 September 1969) is a Honduran politician from the National Party of Honduras who since 2014 serves as Mayor of San Pedro Sula. He previously served as Deputy of the National Congress of Honduras during the 2010–2014 period.

Preceded by Juan Carlos Zuniga	Mayor of San Pedro Sula; 2014 — Present	Succeeded by Incumbent
