= Rodolfo Padilla Sunseri =

Honduran politician

Rodolfo Augusto Padilla Sunseri is a Honduran politician in the Liberal Party of Honduras. He was mayor of San Pedro Sula from January 25, 2006 to June 28, 2009. He supported president of Honduras Manuel Zelaya, and went into exile in Nicaragua after Zelaya's deposition in 2009.

Political offices
Preceded by Oscar Kilgore	Mayor of San Pedro Sula; 2006–2009	Succeeded by Eduardo Bueso (Acting)
