= Dennis Antonio Sánchez =

Honduran politician (born 1962)

Dennis Antonio Sánchez Fernández (born 24 June 1962) is a Honduran politician. He currently serves as deputy of the National Congress of Honduras representing the Liberal Party of Honduras for Santa Bárbara.
