= Juan Carlos Zuniga =

Honduran politician

Juan Carlos Zuniga was the Mayor of San Pedro Sula from 2010 to 2014. He was elected mayor in the 2009 elections and took office on 25 January 2010. He is a member of the Liberal Party of Honduras.

Political offices
Preceded by Eduardo Bueso (Acting)	Mayor of San Pedro Sula; 2010-2014	Succeeded by Armando Calidonio
