= George Romeo Silvestri =

Honduran politician

George Romeo Silvestri Ferez (born 23 April 1950 in La Ceiba) is a Honduran politician who currently serves as deputy of the National Congress of Honduras representing the National Party of Honduras for Islas de la Bahía.
