= Wenceslao Lara Orellana =

Honduran politician

Wenceslao Lara Orellana (born 28 August 1962) is a Honduran politician, who currently serves as deputy of the National Congress of Honduras representing the Liberal Party of Honduras for Cortés.

Orellana is the brother of the deputy and former Puerto Cortés mayor Marlon Guillermo Lara Orellana. He was first elected in 2006.

In 2008 Lara was accused by feminist groups that pleaded with Congress to expulse him of the hemicycle due to a domestic violence case.

In August 2012 Lara announced that he was leaving the Liberal Party to join the recently created Anti-Corruption Party, however, its presidential candidate Salvador Nasralla denied him and in June 2013 Lara returned to the Liberal Party.
