= María Teresa Chávez =

Honduran politician

María Teresa Chávez Ledesma (born 19 February 1953) is a Honduran politician. She currently serves as deputy of the National Congress of Honduras representing the National Party of Honduras for El Paraíso.
