= Mario Pérez de Arce =

Chilean architect

Mario Pérez de Arce Lavín
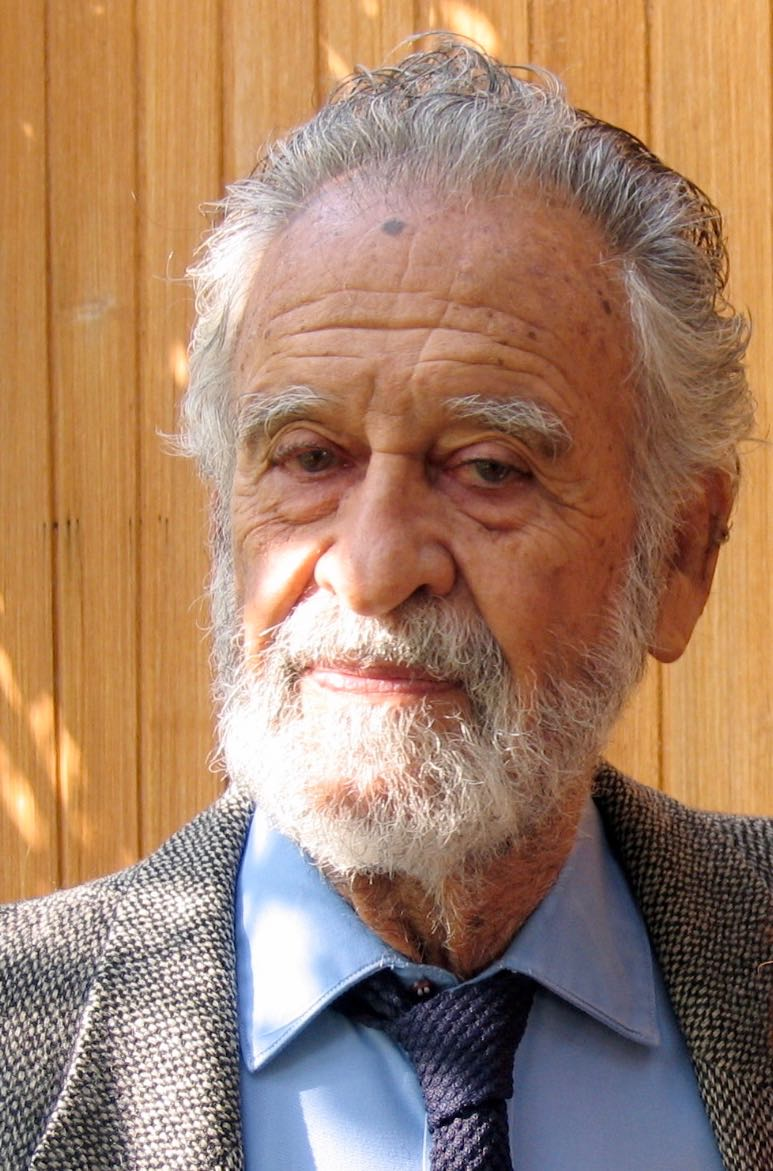
- Born: 1917; Santiago, Chile
- Died: 13 August 2010; Santiago, Chile
- Education: Pontifical Catholic University of Chile
- Occupation: Architect
- Organization: Mario Pérez de Arce Arquitectos
- Known for: Arturo Prat Naval School, Colegio Verbo Divino, Mapocho River Integrated Parks System
- Title: Professor Emeritus
- Awards: Chilean National Architecture Prize (1989)

Mario Pérez de Arce Lavín (1917–2010) was a Chilean architect known for his contributions to modern architecture and urban planning in Chile. In 1989, he was awarded the Chilean National Architecture Prize in recognition of his professional work and influence on the country’s urban landscape.

== Biography ==
Pérez de Arce was born in 1917 in Santiago, Chile. From 1947 to 1995, he served as a professor at the Pontifical Catholic University of Chile (PUC), where he also held the positions of Director of the School of Architecture in 1954 and Dean of the Faculty of Architecture, Design, and Fine Arts from 1973 to 1975. In 1993, he was named Professor Emeritus by PUC for his contributions to architectural education in Chile.

== Career and works ==
Pérez de Arce’s architectural approach aligned with the principles of the modern movement and was influenced by figures such as Le Corbusier. His designs emphasized the relationship between built space and its urban context, integrating functionality with the aesthetic language of his time. Among his most notable works are the Colegio Verbo Divino in Santiago (1947), the Arturo Prat Naval School in Valparaíso (1957), and the indoor pool at Estadio Español in Santiago (1987).

He also collaborated with the Chilean Navy, most notably through the design of the Arturo Prat Naval School. This project is documented in the Chilean Navy’s historical archive.

One of his most well-known urban proposals was the Mapocho River Integrated Parks System, presented in 2010 at the PUC’s Lo Contador campus. The project proposed transforming the banks of the Mapocho River into a 32-kilometer-long public space. Developed in collaboration with PUC, the plan aimed to reinsert the river into Santiago’s daily life and increase public access to green space. After the presentation, Pérez de Arce donated his archive of architectural plans to the Sergio Larraín García Moreno Documentation Center at PUC.

== Mario Pérez de Arce Arquitectos ==
Pérez de Arce founded the firm Mario Pérez de Arce Arquitectos, from which he developed many of his later works. The firm has remained active in urban design and restoration projects and is noted for its commitment to modernist principles.

== Philosophy and reflections ==
Upon being named Professor Emeritus in 1993, Pérez de Arce gave a speech on the role of “common sense” in architecture, describing it as a foundational principle in his practice. He emphasized the balance between functional needs and aesthetic and social values, reflecting his modernist alignment and socially conscious design ethos.

== Legacy ==
Pérez de Arce died on August 13, 2010. His work has been the subject of academic studies, such as Mario Pérez de Arce Lavín: la permanencia de la arquitectura moderna en Chile by León Rodríguez Valdés, and Confesiones de tres arquitectos: vida y obra, a book co-authored with Fernando Castillo Velasco and Héctor Valdés Phillips.

His work is also included in the collection of the Museum of Modern Art (MoMA) in New York.
