= Sadia Argueta =

Honduran politician

Sadia Yarardin Argueta Hernández (born 15 March 1984) is a Honduran politician. She currently serves as deputy of the National Congress of Honduras representing the Christian Democratic Party of Honduras for Cortés.
