= Jesús Inostroza =

Chilean photographer

Jesús Inostroza Toro is a Chilean photographer. He was official photographer of Chilean presidents Patricio Aylwin, Eduardo Frei and Ricardo Lagos, between 1990 and 2001.

He studied Fine Arts, mention in photography, in the Institute of Art of Universidad de Chile from 1975 to 1980.

He worked as a sport photographer in magazines Foto Sport, Estadio, Deporte Total and Triunfo. Between 1987 and 1990 he worked in La Época, a leftish newspaper.

From 1990 to 2001, he worked as a photographer and Head of photography department for Chilean presidents Patricio Aylwin, Eduardo Frei and Ricardo Lagos.

Then, he worked as a photographer in the Metropolitan Zoo in Santiago and was the editor for La Nación newspaper in 2005. He has also taught in universities and institutes.
