= Brenda Mercedes Flores =

Honduran politician (born 1969)

Brenda Mercedes Flores Serrano (born 15 March 1969, in San Pedro Sula) is a Honduran politician. She currently serves as deputy of the National Congress of Honduras representing the National Party of Honduras for Cortés.
