= Orle Solís =

Honduran lawyer and politician

Orle Aníbal Solís Meraz (born 22 August 1953) is a Honduran lawyer and politician. He ran an unsuccessful campaign as the presidential candidate of the Christian Democratic Party of Honduras during the 2013 presidential elections.

Since 2002 he has been a deputy of the National Congress of Honduras representing the Christian Democratic Party of Honduras for Olancho.
