= Fuensanta Aroca =

Spanish mathematician

Fuensanta Aroca Bisquert is a Spanish mathematician who works in Mexico as a researcher in the Institute of Mathematics (Oaxaca unit) of the National Autonomous University of Mexico (UNAM). Her mathematical research involves the use of power series to solve differential equations, singularity theory, and tropical geometry. She has also published research on screening for mental health, and has spoken on discrimination and harassment in mathematics.

== Education and career ==
Aroca was an undergraduate at the Autonomous University of Madrid, where she graduated in 1992. She completed a Ph.D. in 2000 at the University of Valladolid; her dissertation, Métodos algebraicos en ecuaciones diferenciales de primer orden en el campo complejo, was supervised by José M. Aroca Hernández Ros.

She has been a researcher at the UNAM Institute of Mathematics (Cuernavaca unit) since 2004.

== Recognition ==
Aroca was elected to the Mexican Academy of Sciences in 2022.
