= Elvia María Pérez =

Mexican politician

- Born: 30 January 1954 (age 72); Campeche, Mexico
- Occupation: Deputy
- Political party: PRI

Elvia María Pérez Escalante (born 30 January 1954) is a Mexican politician affiliated with the PRI. As of 2013 she served as Deputy of the LXII Legislature of the Mexican Congress representing Campeche.
