= Alberto Chedrani =

Honduran politician

Alberto Chedrani Castañeda (born 7 March 1957 in Lima, cortés ) is a Honduran businessman and politician who currently serves as deputy of the National Congress of Honduras, representing the National Party of Honduras for Cortés.

In the 2012 primary elections, Chedrani was reelected as deputy candidate. However, in February 2013 he withdrew it due to differences with the National Party's directives.
