= Elman Joel Sandoval =

Honduran politician

Elman Joel Sandoval Sabonge (born 27 February 1972 in Juticalpa) is a Honduran politician. He currently serves as deputy of the National Congress of Honduras representing the Liberal Party of Honduras for Olancho.

In January 2013 Sandoval became subject of controversy and critics. While the Congress was discussing and approving the 2013 Budget, Sandoval was watching in his assigned laptop a F.C. Barcelona match for the 2012–13 Copa del Rey.
