= Roberto Gámez Panchamé =

Honduran politician

Roberto Gámez Pánchamé (born 23 October 1950) is a Honduran veterinarian and politician. He currently serves as deputy of the National Congress of Honduras representing the National Party of Honduras for Yoro.
