= Ángel Darío Banegas =

Honduran politician

- Born: October 21, 1969 (age 56); Santa Bárbara, Honduras
- Occupations: Cartoonist, television host, politician
- Website: https://twitter.com/Angeldariobaneg

Ángel Darío Banegas Leiva (born 21 October 1969 in Santa Bárbara, Honduras) is a Honduran political cartoonist, former reporter, television host and politician. He currently serves as deputy of the National Congress of Honduras representing the Liberal Party of Honduras for Cortés.

== Career ==
He started as reporter and press correspondent during his youth, also he was sports commentator in some radio stations in San Pedro Sula. However he started his career as cartoonist in 1985, making a daily cartoon in El Heraldo.

Later in 1989, he was hired by Diario Tiempo and one year later began in La Prensa where he is actually.

Since 2003, he hosts and directs a daily television program in Telered 21 called En voz alta.

In 2009 elections he was elected as deputy of the National Congress of Honduras for the Liberal Party.
