= Waldina Paz =

Honduran politician

Jariet Waldina Paz (born 15 June 1966 in Tegucigalpa) is a Honduran journalist and politician. She currently serves as deputy of the National Congress of Honduras representing the Liberal Party of Honduras for Francisco Morazán.
