= Salvador Valeriano Pineda =

Honduran politician

Salvador Valeriano Pineda (born 6 August 1965) is a Honduran politician. He currently serves as deputy of the National Congress of Honduras representing the National Party of Honduras for Lempira.
