= Wilfredo Bustillo Castellanos =

Honduran politician

Wilfredo Bustillo Castellanos (born 17 January 1958 in Comayagua) is a Honduran politician. He currently serves as deputy of the National Congress of Honduras representing the National Party of Honduras for Comayagua.
