= José Rodolfo Zelaya =

Honduran politician (born 1968)

José Rodolfo Zelaya Portillo
- Born: 19 October 1968 (age 57); Tegucigalpa, Honduras.
- Education: Central American Technological University, UNITEC
- Occupations: Executive Director, Ex-congressman
- Title: Executive Director for Latin America for Del Norte

Rodolfo Zelaya Portillo (born 19 October 1968 in Tegucigalpa) is a Honduran politician. He is a former congressman of the National Congress of Honduras representing the National Party of Honduras for the department of Francisco Morazán. He is one of the most notable and recognized politicians in the area of security and defense.

== Career ==
Portillo served 16 years as a congressman between 1998 and 2014 for the National Party of Honduras during which time he was appointed Sub-chief of the National Party of Honduras in congress during Ricardo Maduro's presidency and was elected as a congressman in the department of Francisco Morazán during the period of 2010–2014 under the presidency of Porfirio Lobo Sosa.

Portillo served as Vice President of the national anti-narcotics commission between 27 January 2006 and the 26 January 2010, and presided the presidency of the commission against drug trafficking between 2006 and 2010 as well as Vice President of the national defense commission between 2010 and 2014.

In recent years Portillo served as the minister of the Plan de Nación (National Plan) for 8 years between 2014 and 2022 during the presidency of Juan Orlando Hernández. Currently he works in the private sector as executive director for governmental advisory firm Del Norte.
