= Yaudet Burbara =

Nicaragua politician

Yaudet Burbara Canahuati, also known as Júnior Burbara (born July 21, 1971) is a Honduran engineer, businessman and politician of Palestinian ancestry. He was born in San Pedro Sula. He currently serves as a deputy in the National Congress of Honduras representing the National Party of Honduras for the Cortés Department. His first term began on January 27, 2010, and he was re-elected in 2014, 2018 and 2022.
