= Perla Simons =

Honduran politician (born 1963)

Perla Simons Morales (born 15 March 1963 in San Pedro Sula) is a Honduran politician. She currently serves as deputy of the National Congress of Honduras, representing the Liberal Party of Honduras for Francisco Morazán. She is the only African-Honduran deputy in the Congress and was first elected in 2006.
