= Claudio Roberto Perdomo =

Honduran politician (born 1964)

Claudio Roberto Perdomo Interiano (born 20 March 1964) is a Honduran politician. He currently serves as deputy of the National Congress of Honduras representing the National Party of Honduras for Santa Bárbara.
