= Ana Julia García =

Honduran politician (born 1961)

Ana Julia García Villalobos (born 19 June 1961 in Langue, Valle) is a Honduran politician. She served as deputy of the National Congress of Honduras representing the National Party of Honduras for Valle.
