= Sergio Arturo Castellanos =

Honduran politician (born 1969)

Sergio Arturo Castellanos Perdomo (born 21 December 1969 in Concepción del Sur) is a Honduran politician. He served as deputy of the National Congress of Honduras representing the Democratic Unification Party for Santa Bárbara.
