= José Azcona Bocock =

Honduran politician

José Simón Azcona Bocock (born 13 May 1972 in La Ceiba) is a Honduran businessman and politician, currently acts as deputy of the National Congress of Honduras representing the Liberal Party of Honduras for Francisco Morazán.

He is son of the late former President of Honduras José Azcona del Hoyo.

== Political career ==
- 2000: Pre-candidate of the Liberal Party for Tegucigalpa
- 2002–2006: Council of Tegucigalpa
- 2006–2010: Deputy of the National Congress of Honduras for Francisco Morazán
