= Oscar Orlando Burgos =

Honduran politician (born 1957)

Oscar Orlando Burgos (born 18 January 1957 in Yoro) is a Honduran politician. He currently serves as deputy of the National Congress of Honduras representing the National Party of Honduras for Yoro.
