= Gladys Bernarda Casco =

Honduran politician

Gladys Bernarda Casco Cruz (born 20 August 1954) is a Honduran politician. She currently serves as deputy of the National Congress of Honduras representing the National Party of Honduras for Choluteca.
