= Walter Antonio Chávez =

Honduran politician

Walter Antonio Chávez Hernández (born 24 July 1971, in Yuscarán) is a Honduran teacher and politician. He currently serves as deputy of the National Congress of Honduras representing the National Party of Honduras for El Paraíso Department.
