= Eliseo Noel Mejía =

Honduran politician

Eliseo Noel Mejía Castillo (born 17 February 1948 in Colón) is a Honduran politician. He currently serves as deputy of the National Congress of Honduras representing the National Party of Honduras for Cortés.
