= Elvia Josefina Amador =

Honduran politician

Elvia Josefina Amador Muñoz (born 1 May 1948) is a Honduran politician. She served as deputy of the National Congress of Honduras representing the Liberal Party of Honduras for Olancho during the 2006–2010 term.
