= Ruvalcaba =

Ruvalcaba is a Spanish surname. Notable people with the surname include:

- Felipe Ruvalcaba (1941–2019), Mexican association football forward
- Higinio Ruvalcaba (1905–1976), Mexican violinist and composer
- Lenia Ruvalcaba (born 1986), Mexican judoka
- Marcelo Garza Ruvalcaba (born 1983), Mexican politician
- Nicolás Ruvalcaba (born 1982), Mexican association football player
- Rogelio Ruvalcaba (born 1988), Mexican boxer

== See also ==
- Bannayan–Riley–Ruvalcaba syndrome, a rare overgrowth syndrome
