= Oscar Álvarez (politician) =

Honduran politician

Oscar Alvarez is a former Honduran politician who served as Secretary of Public Security for the Government of Honduras from 2002 to 2005, as well as serving from 2010 to 2011 under a different administration. He has also been elected to the National Congress of Honduras multiple times, where he held the distinction of named Congressional Party Leader by his peers for the duration of the 2014 term.

== Minister of Public Security ==
Álvarez is in charge of all internal security for Honduras. In his first term he played a key role in helping to implement Homeland Security’s CSI (Container Security Initiative), which gave Hondurans the ability to ship containers to any port in the United States without major security restrictions.

Álvarez also worked closely with several United States agencies in the fight against organized crime, narcotics trafficking, terrorism, human smuggling, and gangs. Such agencies include but are not limited to: Drug Enforcement Administration (DEA), Federal Bureau of Investigation (FBI), Customs and Border Protection (CBP), Immigration and Customs Enforcement (ICE), and the Central Intelligence Agency (CIA). His attempts to make Honduras safer led to a tough crackdown on gangs that saw many gang members put in jail.

Álvarez was also a key element in the establishment of the Honduran Border Patrol Units, in close cooperation with Homeland Security’s Border Tactical Units (BORTAC). Up to today, it is considered among the most successful exercises involving international cooperation in law enforcement between the United States of America and Honduras. On September 10, 2011 unexplained events led to the forced resignation of Alvarez and his closest staff. According to CSmonitor.com: “The departure of the Honduran Security Minister Oscar Alvarez, the leading crusader against police corruption in Honduras, is a victory for crooked cops.

With the departure of Honduran Security Minister Oscar Alvarez, an outspoken foe of police corruption, the country is facing an uphill battle as it grapples with attempts to reform its notorious police force.

In a surprise move, the administration of President Porfirio Lobo announced late Saturday night that it had accepted Mr. Alvarez's resignation. Up until now, he had been seen as one of the president’s closest and most influential advisers. While officials are claiming that the resignation was voluntary, Alvarez was joined by Foreign Minister Mario Canahuati as well as several other ministers and deputy ministers, suggesting they were dismissed as part of a major shake-up.”

== Past accomplishments ==
Alvarez has held numerous presidential appointments in Honduras, including deputy chief of staff and director of the Office of Coordination and Analysis, which reports directly to the president of Honduras. Alvarez is founder and president of ATESA Seguridad, one of the largest security companies in Honduras. ATESA Seguridad provides turn key service to many major banks and industries. Services include risk analysis, due diligence, design and implementation of electronic and physical security, training and maintenance of the equipment. Also, Atesa Seguridad has done specialized work for global security companies such as Control Risk, Kroll and foreign intelligence services.

Alvarez attended several US military schools, including Ranger, Special Forces and the Corps of Cadets at Texas A&M University, where he had the distinction of being the first cadet to receive commission in a foreign army. During Alvarez's career he has been awarded several medals and recognitions, including the Honduran Army Combat Medal, Commendation Medal, US Special Forces School Achievement Medal and Special Recognition from the US State Department, FBI and DEA. Mr. Alvarez has a BA in political science from Texas A&M University and has attended the School of Advanced International Studies (SAIS) taking courses on International Relations and Security Studies.

== Family ==
Alvarez is married and has four children.
