= Gabo Alfredo Jalil =

Honduran politician

Gabo Alfredo Jalil Mejía (born 11 December 1962) is a Honduran politician. He served as deputy of the National Congress of Honduras representing the Liberal Party of Honduras for Francisco Morazán during the 2006-10 period.
