= German Leitzelar =

Honduran lawyer and politician

German Edgardo Leitzelar Vidaurreta (born 4 July 1945) is a Honduran lawyer and politician, he was a member of the National Congress of Honduras representing the Innovation and Unity Party for Francisco Morazán.
