= Welsy Vásquez =

Honduran politician

Welsy Milena Vásquez López (born 17 September 1970 in San Pedro Sula) is a Honduran journalist and politician. She currently serves as deputy of the National Congress of Honduras representing the National Party of Honduras for Cortés.

She is well known in television for being reporter and anchor of the morning news program Desde Temprano from 1998 until 2008.
