= Mario Alexander Barahona Martínez =

Honduran politician

Mario Alexander Barahona Martínez (born October 3, 1976) is a Honduran businessman and retired politician.

Mostly known for being a member of the National Party of Honduras, he represented the Francisco Morazan Department and was a congressman of the National Congress of Honduras for 2006–2010, and 2010–2014.

He is also the son of the renowned Honduran late Pastor Mario Tomas Barahona.
