= Maria Aracely Leiva =

Honduran politician (born 1967)

Maria Aracely Leiva Peña (born 23 June 1967) is a Honduran politician. She currently serves as deputy of the National Congress of Honduras representing the Liberal Party of Honduras for Atlántida.
