= Hipólita Rodríguez =

Honduran politician (1925–2023)

Hipólita Graciela Rodríguez (13 August 1925 – August 2023), also known as Mama Chela, was a Honduran politician.

== Life and career ==
Rodríguez was born in Yoro on 13 August 1925. She served as deputy of the National Congress of Honduras, representing the Democratic Unification Party for Yoro from 2010 to 2014. Rodríguez was 84 when first elected in 2009. In July 2014, Rodríguez was honoured, receiving a scroll and a gold medal for her political service. Rodríguez died in Sulaco, Yoro in August 2023, at the age of 97.
