= José Juan Rivera Ramos =

Honduran politician (born 1970)

José Juan Rivera Ramos (born 21 December 1970 in Copán Department) is a Honduran politician. He currently serves as deputy of the National Congress of Honduras representing the National Party of Honduras for La Paz.
