= Jesús Dagoberto Perdomo =

Honduran politician (born 1967)

Jesús Dagoberto Perdomo Chávez (born 13 October 1967 in Santa Bárbara, Honduras) is a Honduran doctor and politician. He currently serves as deputy of the National Congress of Honduras representing the Liberal Party of Honduras for Santa Bárbara.
