= Rigoberto Chang Castillo =

Honduran lawyer and politician

Rigoberto Chang Castillo (born 1 May 1950 in Tegucigalpa) is a Honduran lawyer and politician, currently serves as Secretary of the National Congress of Honduras after being elected representing the National Party of Honduras for Francisco Morazán.
