= Silvia Ayala =

Honduran lawyer and politician

Silvia Bessy Ayala Figueroa (born 14 December 1969, in Cortés) is a Honduran lawyer and politician. She served as deputy of the National Congress of Honduras representing the Democratic Unification Party for Cortés during the 2006–10 term.

She ran as a candidate for deputy representing LIBRE for the 2013 general election.
