= Milton Jesús Puerto =

Honduran politician (born 1969)

Milton Jesús Puerto Oseguera (born 1 January 1969) is a Honduran politician. He currently serves as deputy of the National Congress of Honduras representing the National Party of Honduras for Yoro.
