= Fredy Renán Nájera =

Honduran politician

Fredy Renán Nájera Montoya (born 11 January 1977) is a former Honduran politician and convicted drug trafficker. He had served as deputy of the National Congress of Honduras, representing the Liberal Party of Honduras for Olancho.

In early 2013 Nájera was accused of homicide.

In 2018, Nájera pleaded guilty to conspiracy to import cocaine into the US and possession of weapons during the course of the conspiracy. US Attorney Geoffrey Berman, in a press release, stated: "As he has now admitted in a United States courthouse, Fredy Renan Najera Montoya used his power and influence as a Honduran congressman to facilitate the transporting of massive amounts of cocaine from Colombia through Honduras, and ultimately to the streets of the U.S. He further admitted that he and his hired security teams used military-grade weapons, including machineguns, to protect the drug smuggling enterprise. Now, Najera awaits sentencing for the serious crimes to which he has pled."

His sentencing is scheduled to take place on August 10, 2020.
