= Víctor Rolando Sabillón =

Honduran politician

Víctor Rolando Sabillón Sabillón (born 12 October 1963 in Santa Bárbara) is a Honduran politician. He currently serves as deputy Vice-President of the National Congress of Honduras representing the Liberal Party of Honduras for Santa Bárbara.
