= Eleazar Alexander Juárez =

Honduran politician (born 1969)

Eleazar Alexander Juárez Sarabia (born 11 March 1969 in Nacaome) is a Honduran doctor and former politician, he served as deputy of the National Congress of Honduras representing the Liberal Party of Honduras for Valle from 2006 to 2014 and Partido Libertad y Refundacion from 2014 to 2018.
