= Juan Carlos Valenzuela (politician) =

Honduran politician

Juan Carlos Valenzuela Molina (born 21 December 1970 in Santa Rosa de Copán) is a Honduran politician. He currently serves as deputy of the National Congress of Honduras representing the National Party of Honduras for Lempira.
