= Renan Inestroza =

Honduran politician (born 1965)

Renan Inestroza (born 4 December 1965) is a member of the National Congress of Honduras representing the National Party of Honduras.
