= Norma Haydee Calderón =

Honduran politician (born 1967)

Norma Haydee Calderón Arias (born 4 April 1967) is a Honduran politician. She currently serves as deputy of the National Congress of Honduras representing the Liberal Party of Honduras for Cortés.
