= Celín Discua =

Honduran politician

José Celín Discua Elvir (born 26 August 1950 in Valle de Ángeles) is a Honduran politician who currently serves as deputy of the National Congress of Honduras representing and leading the National Party of Honduras for El Paraíso.
