= Carlos Ramón Aguilar Guifarro =

Honduran politician

Carlos Ramón Aguilar Guifarro (born July 28, 1973) is a Honduran politician. A member of the National Party of Honduras, he represents the Colón Department and is a deputy of the National Congress of Honduras for 2006–2010. His profession is a lawyer.
