= Marvin Ponce =

Honduran politician

Marvin Ponce served as deputy of the National Congress of Honduras. Marvin Ponce is widely known among Hondurans for throwing a glass full of water at a colleague on national TV. On April 12, 2018, while discussing the subject of a national political dialogue, he became involved in a verbal altercation with Ricardo Salgado, political advisor to the LIBRE party. Both men exchanged insults, and Ponce threatened to throw water at his opponent.
