= Victoria Carrasco =

Honduran politician

Victoria Carrasco García (born 6 March 1946) is a Honduran politician. She currently serves as deputy of the National Congress of Honduras representing the National Party of Honduras for Cortés.
