= Carlos Alfredo Lara Watson =

Honduran politician

Carlos Alfredo Lara Watson (born 28 December 1952) is a Honduran politician. He currently serves as deputy of the National Congress of Honduras representing the Liberal Party of Honduras for Choluteca.
