= Tomás Zambrano =

Honduran politician (born 1982)

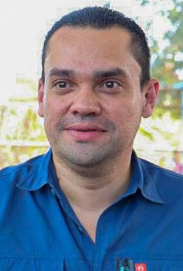
- Zambrano in 2026

President of the National Congress
- Incumbent
- Assumed office 25 January 2026
- Preceded by: Luis Redondo

Member of National Congress of Honduras
- Incumbent
- Assumed office 25 January 2010

Personal details
- Born: José Tomás Zambrano Molina; 29 July 1982 (age 43)
- Party: National

José Tomás Zambrano Molina (born 29 July 1982) is a Honduran politician serving as a member of the National Congress since 2010. He has served as president of the Congress since 2026.
