= Mario Alonso Pérez López =

Honduran lawyer and politician

Mario Alonso Pérez López (born 13 July 1975 in Santa Bárbara) is a Honduran lawyer and politician. He currently serves as the secretary of the National Congress of Honduras representing the National Party of Honduras for Santa Bárbara. He is married and has one daughter.
