= Antonio Rivera Callejas =

Honduran politician and lawyer

Antonio César Rivera Callejas (born 17 January 1963 in Tegucigalpa) is a Honduran lawyer and politician who currently serves as deputy of the National Congress of Honduras representing the National Party of Honduras for Francisco Morazán.

He was first elected for the 2006-2010 period and is well known as the "Chocollos deputy". He is known also for his conservative character. He has five children
