= Marco Antonio Andino =

Honduran politician and lawyer

Marco Antonio Andino Flores (25 April 1955 – 9 August 2015) was a Honduran politician and lawyer. He served as deputy of the National Congress of Honduras representing the Liberal Party of Honduras for Francisco Morazán.

Andino was born in San Buenaventura, Francisco Morazán Department. He served as mayor of Tegucigalpa from 2002 to 2006. While serving as Deputy, he earned a law degree from the Universidad Nacional Autónoma de Honduras (UNAH). He was married and had three children.

Andino suffered from diabetes and hypertension, and died at home of cardiac arrest.
