= Toribio Aguilera =

Honduran economist and politician

José Toribio Aguilera Coello (7 March 1941 – 10 June 2014) was a Honduran economist and politician. He served as deputy of the National Congress of Honduras representing the Innovation and Unity Party for Cortés from 1998 to 2014. He died of cancer in Tegucigalpa.
