= Martha Concepción Figueroa =

Honduran politician (born 1952)

Martha Concepción Figueroa Torres (born 17 July 1952 in Santa Bárbara) is a Honduran teacher and politician. She currently serves as deputy and Fifth Vice-president of the National Congress of Honduras representing the National Party of Honduras for Santa Bárbara.
