= Donaldo Ernesto Reyes =

Honduran lawyer and politician

Donaldo Ernesto Reyes Avelar (born 18 June 1939 in Santa Bárbara) is a Honduran lawyer and politician. He currently serves as deputy of the National Congress of Honduras representing the National Party of Honduras for Santa Bárbara.
