= Rodolfo Irias Navas =

Honduran politician

Rodolfo Irias Navas (born 25 October 1949 in La Ceiba) is a Honduran politician; he currently acts as deputy of the National Congress of Honduras representing the National Party for Atlántida since 1986.

In 1990, after being elected, he took office as President of the National Congress of Honduras from 1990 until 1994.
