= José Alfredo Saavedra =

Interim President of the National Congress of Honduras following the 2009 coup until 2010

Acting President of the National Congress
- In office 28 June 2009 – 25 January 2010
- Preceded by: Roberto Micheletti
- Succeeded by: Juan Orlando Hernandez

Personal details
- Born: Honduras

José Alfredo Saavedra (born December 4, 1964) is a Honduran Liberal Party politician and was head of the National Congress of Honduras from June 28, 2009 to January 25, 2010, a position he took from Roberto Micheletti when the 2009 Honduran constitutional crisis saw the forced removal of Manuel Zelaya from being President of Honduras.

Political offices
Preceded by Roberto Micheletti	President of the National Congress of Honduras (Acting); 2009-2010	Succeeded by Juan Orlando Hernández
