= Oscar Ramón Nájera =

Honduran politician

Oscar Ramón Nájera (born 12 December 1950) is a Honduran politician. He currently serves as deputy of the National Congress of Honduras representing the National Party of Honduras for Colón.

== International Sanctions ==
On April 26, 2021, the UK's Foreign Office announced personal restrictions against Najera under the Global AntiCorruption Sanctions Regime, making him subject to a travel ban and an asset freeze, citing his alleged involvement in significant corruption and facilitation of drug trafficking.
