= Marlon Guillermo Lara Orellana =

Honduran politician (born 1966)

Marlon Guillermo Lara Orellana (born April 30, 1966, in San Pedro Sula, Honduras) is a Liberal Party politician from Honduras. He was Mayor of the City of Puerto Cortes and former Minister of the Government under the presidency of Manuel Zelaya. He served as the 2nd vice-president of the National Congress of Honduras(Jan. 25, 2010- Jan. 21, 2014).

== Background ==
Lara's family moved to Puerto Cortes, Honduras where he grew up. His brother Wenceslao Lara was elected Congressman on the 2005 elections and was re-elected on the 2009 elections for another four years term. He was also mayor of Puerto CortesMarlon Lara holds a Doctor in Chemistry and Pharmacy from UNAH (Universidad Autónoma de Honduras) and an Executive Master of Business Administration (MBA) from INCAE (Instituto Centroamericano de Administracion de Empresas). He speaks three languages: Spanish, English and French.

== Political career ==
Lara is an active member of the Honduran Liberal Party (Partido Liberal de Honduras in Spanish). In 1989, at age 23, he started his political career by running unsuccessfully for a seat in the National Congress. In 1993 he ran for Mayor of Puerto Cortes, winning the election overwhelmingly. With his two subsequent re-elections, Lara was mayor for three consecutive terms (January 25, 1994 - January 25, 2006), a feat unprecedented among Honduran mayors at that time.

In 2004 he started an internal movement within the Liberal Party in order to win candidacy for President of Honduras in the near future. His movement lost the internal elections of the Liberal Party in 2005 by a wide margin, but helped him to secure a future appointment as Minister in the Government of Manuel Zelaya. On January 27, 2006, he was appointed the Minister-Director of FHIS-Fondo Hondureño de Inversion Social (Honduran Social Investment Fund) under the Zelaya Administration.

In December 2006 Lara was one of the Government Officials who failed the annual evaluation performed by President Zelaya. The evaluation process was a new initiative introduced by Zelaya and was headed by Minister Yani Rosenthal. Lara received one of the lowest scores among all ministers. Immediately the Government started the process to separate the failed official. He presented his resignation in January 2007. The evaluation process is being criticized, because the worst evaluated ministers were kept in the Government for four years.

== 2009 Honduran general election ==
Marlon Lara served as Elvin Ernesto Santos national chairperson during the 2009 elections. Marlon ran for congressman in the 2009 and 2013 elections and won. He was the 2nd vice-president of the National Congress (Jan 25, 2010- Jan 21,2014)
