= Mario Edgardo Segura =

Honduran politician

Mario Edgardo Segura Aroca (born 7 October 1966) is a Honduran engineer and politician. He currently serves as deputy of the National Congress of Honduras representing the Liberal Party of Honduras for El Paraíso.
