= Julio César Gámez Interiano =

Honduran politician

Julio César Gámez Interiano (born 8 December 1955) is a Honduran politician. He currently serves as deputy of the National Congress of Honduras representing the National Party of Honduras for Copán.
