= Miguel Ángel Gámez =

Honduran politician

Miguel Ángel Gámez (born 5 December 1954) is a Honduran politician. He served as deputy of the National Congress of Honduras representing the National Party of Honduras for Intibucá.

In April 2012 he was appointed as minister of the Secretary of Public Works, Transport and Housing. He left office in May 2013 in order to run for re-election in the 2013 general elections.

Gámez is also known for writing both literature and songs. He is a civil engineer with specialty in pavements, and he serves as the Honduran representative for the Iberolatinamerican Asphalt Pavement Congress.
