= Christian Democratic Party of Honduras =

Christian Democratic Party of Honduras Partido Demócrata Cristiano de Honduras
- Leader: Lucas Evangelisto Aguilera
- Founded: 10 September 1968
- Headquarters: Tegucigalpa
- Ideology: Christian democracy
- Political position: Center-right
- Regional affiliation: Center-Democratic Integration Group
- Continental affiliation: Christian Democrat Organization of America
- International affiliation: Centrist Democrat International
- Colors: Green
- Anthem: "Himno Partido Democracia Cristiana de Honduras" "Hymn of the Christian Democratic Party of Honduras"
- National Congress: 1 / 128

Party flag

Website
- www.pdch.hn (archived)

The Christian Democratic Party of Honduras (Spanish: Partido Demócrata Cristiano de Honduras), known by the abbreviation DC, is a political party in Honduras. At the legislative elections, held on 25 November 2001, DC won 3.7% of the popular vote and three out of 128 seats in the National Congress. Its candidate at the presidential elections, Marco Orlando Iriarte, won 1.0% of the vote.

In the legislative elections of 27 November 2005, the party won four out of 128 seats in the Congress. Its candidate at the presidential elections, Juan Ramón Martínez won 1.4%.

DC's candidate in the 2009 presidential election was Felicito Ávila. The party supported the interim government of Roberto Micheletti which came to power in the 2009 Honduran coup d'état, itself a part of the 2009 Honduran constitutional crisis. Orle Solís was the party's candidate for the 2013 presidential elections. Mario Rivera ran as a Presidential Candidate for the Christian Democratic Party in the 2025 Honduran general election and when election day ended after 30 November 2025, the party only won 6,450 votes or 0.18% of the vote which is close to five times fewer votes than the next place Partido de PINU-SD In the Parliamentary/National Congress elections on the same year and day, the Party received 552,739 Votes or 2.73% of the Vote, maintaining One seat.
