= Erick Mauricio Rodríguez =

Honduran lawyer and politician (born 1968)

Erick Mauricio Rodríguez Gavarrete (born 23 February 1968 in Tegucigalpa) is a Honduran lawyer and politician. He currently serves as deputy of the National Congress of Honduras representing the Liberal Party of Honduras for Lempira.
