= National Congress of Honduras =

National legislature of Honduras

Coordinates: 14.10375°N 87.20495°W

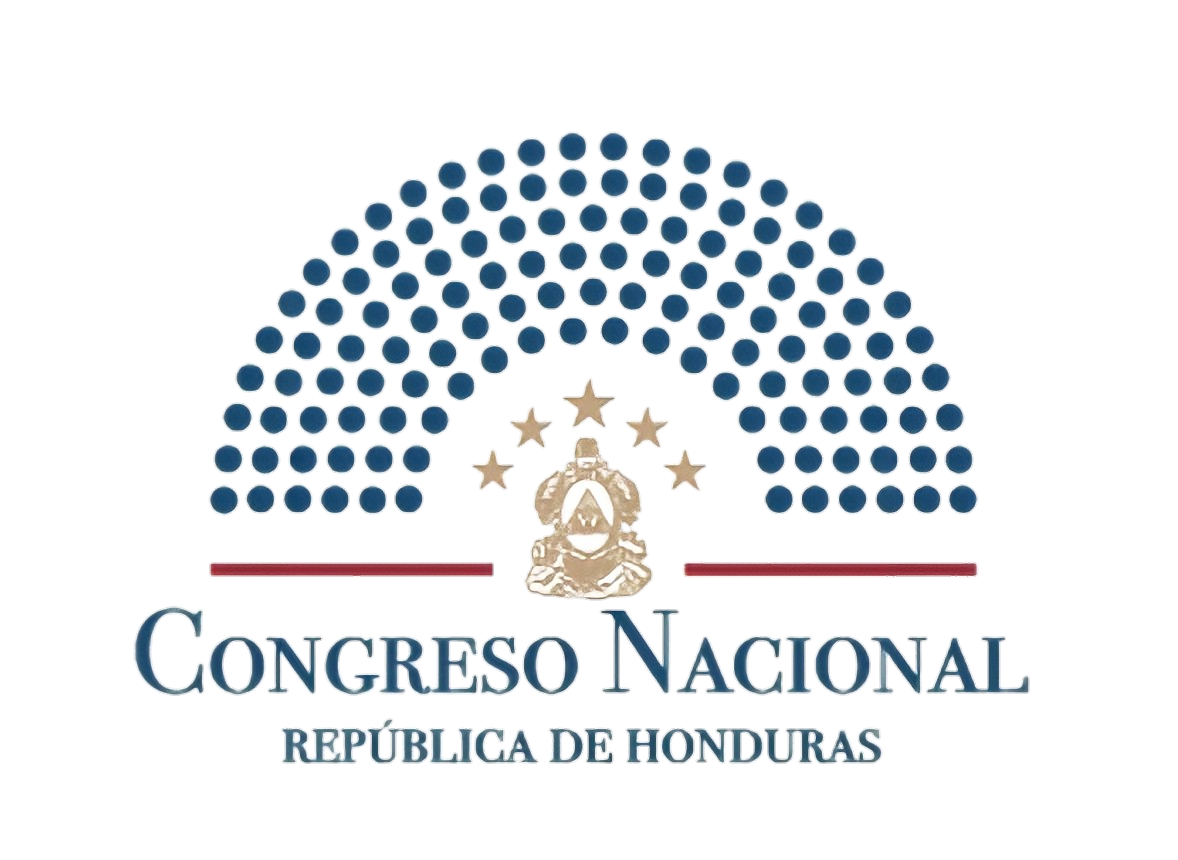

Type
- Type: Unicameral

Leadership
- President: Tomás Zambrano (National) since 20 January 2026

Structure
- Seats: 128
- Political groups: Government (49): National (49); Opposition (79): Liberal (41); Libre (35); PINU (2); Christian Democratic (1)

Elections
- Voting system: Open list proportional representation
- Last election: 30 November 2025
- Next election: By late November 2029

Meeting place
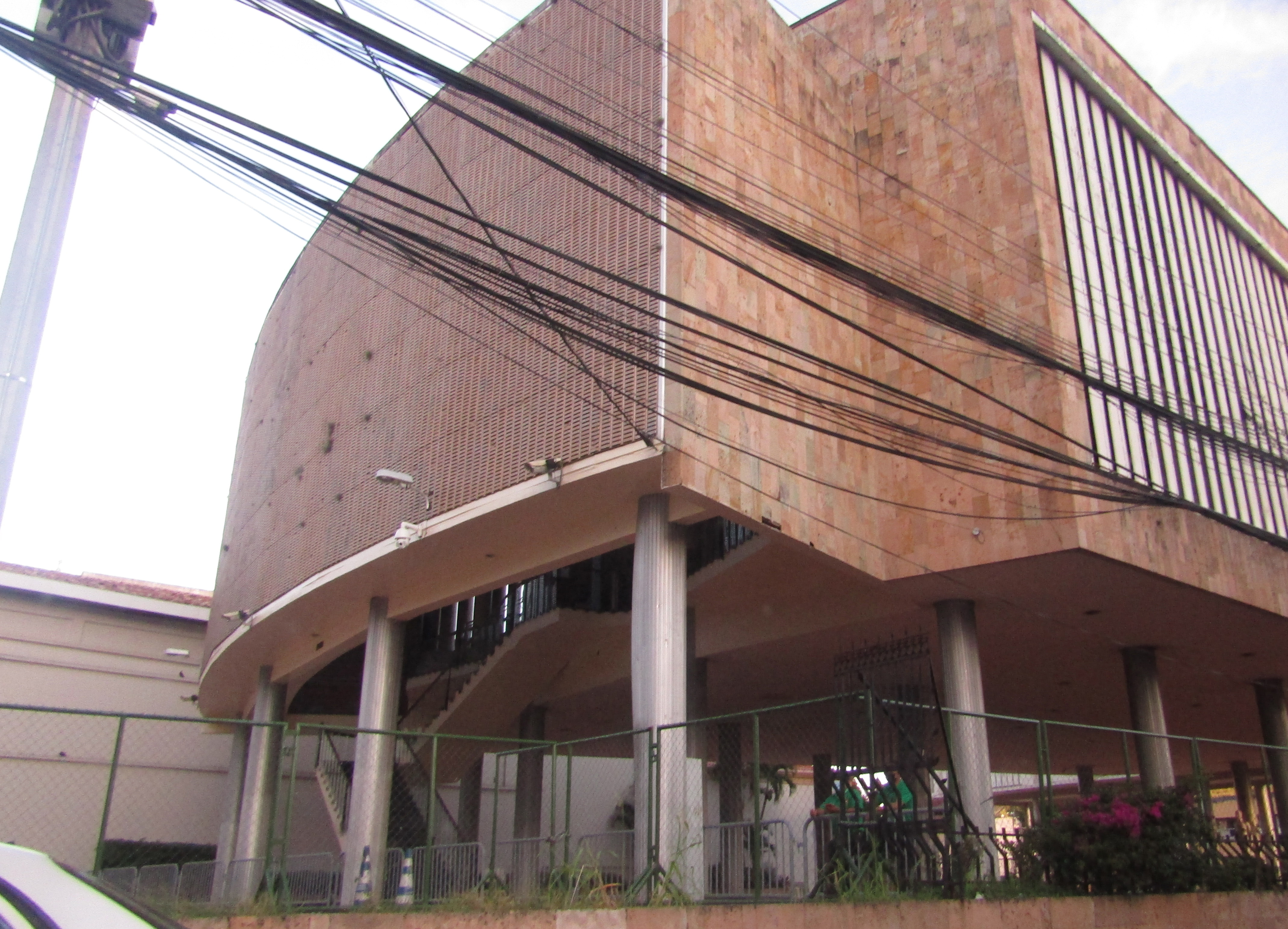
- Legislative Palace, Tegucigalpa

Website
- www.congresonacional.hn

The National Congress (Spanish: Congreso Nacional) is the legislative branch of the government of Honduras.

== Organization ==
The Honduran Congress is a unicameral legislature. The nominal President of the National Congress of Honduras is currently Luis Redondo. Its members are 128 deputies, who are elected on a proportional representation basis, by department, to serve four-year terms.

== Meeting place ==
Congress meets in a purpose-built legislative palace (Palacio Legislativo) in the centre of Tegucigalpa. Of a modernist design, it is painted in an array of bright colours and rests on a series of concrete pillars that separate it from the ground.

== Directive ==
=== 2022–2026 legislative period ===
The directive of the National Congress for the period 2022–2026:

- Luis Redondo (President) (PSH)
- Hugo Noé Pino (1st Vice-President) (LIBRE)
- Edgardo Casaña (2nd Vice-President) (LIBRE)
- Rasel Tomé (3rd Vice-President) (LIBRE)
- Scherly Arriaga (4th Vice-President) (LIBRE)
- Iroshka Elvir (5th Vice-President) (PSH)
- Fátima Mena (6th Vice-President) (PSH)
- Ricardo Elencoff (7th Vice-President) (PLH)
- Christian Josué Hernández (Alternate Vice-President) (LIBRE)
- Kritza Pérez (Alternate Vice-President) (PLH)
- Issis Cuellar (Alternate Vice-President) (LIBRE)
- Carlos Alexis Raudales (Alternate Vice-President) (DC)
- Carlos Zelaya (General Secretary) (LIBRE)
- Luz Angelica Smith (2nd Secretary) (LIBRE)
- Fabricio Sandoval (1st Pro-Secretary) (LIBRE)
- Linda Donaire (2nd Pro-Secretary) (LIBRE)
- Juan Barahona (Alternate Secretary) (LIBRE)
- Silvia Ayala (Alternate Secretary) (LIBRE)

=== 2018–2022 legislative period ===
The directive of the National Congress for the period 2018–2022:

- Mauricio Oliva (President) (PNH)
- Antonio César Rivera (1st Vice-President) (PNH)
- Denis Armando Castro (2nd Vice-President) (APH)
- Milton Jesus Puerto Oseguera (3rd Vice-President) (PNH)
- Mario Noé Villafranca (4th Vice-President) (UD)
- Felicito Ávila Ordóñez (5th Vice-President) (DC)
- Gladis Aurora López Calderón (6th Vice-President) (PNH)
- Román Villeda Aguilar (7th Vice-President) (PNH)
- Elden Vásquez (Alternate Vice-President) (PNH)
- Walter Antonio Chávez Hernández (Alternate Vice-President) (PNH)
- Olga Josefa Ayala Alvarenga (Alternate Vice-President) (PNH)
- Dunia Lizzette Ortiz Cruz (Alternate Vice-President) (APH)
- José Tomás Zambrano Molina (1st Secretary) (PNH)
- Salvador Valeriano Pineda (2nd Secretary) (PNH)
- Teresa Concepción Cálix Raudales (1st Pro-Secretary) (PNH)
- Rossel Renán Inestroza Martínez (2nd Pro-Secretary) (PNH)
- Gerardo Tulio Martínez Pineda (Alternate Secretary) (PNH)
- Wilmer Raynel Neal Velásquez (Alternate Secretary) (PNH)

=== 2014–2018 legislative period ===
The directive of the National Congress for the period 2014–2018 is:

- Mauricio Oliva (President) (PNH)
- Gladis Aurora López (1st Vice-President) (PNH)
- Lena Gutiérrez Arévalo (2nd Vice-President) (PNH)
- Antonio Rivera Callejas (3rd Vice-President) (PNH)
- Milton de Jesús Puerto (4th Vice-President) (PNH)
- Miguel Edgardo Martínez (5th Vice-President) (PNH)
- Augusto Cruz Ascensio (6th Vice-President) (DC)
- Edwin Roberto Pavón (7th Vice-President) (UD)
- Rolando Dubón Bueso (Alternate Vice-President) (PNH)
- Ramón Antonio Leva Bulnes (Alternate Vice-President) (PNH)
- Jose Vicente de León Rojas (Alternate Vice-President) (PNH)
- Mario Alonso Perez (1st Secretary) (PNH)
- Román Villeda Aguilar (2nd Secretary) (PNH)
- José María Martínez (Alternate Secretary) (PNH)
- Wilmer Neal Velásquez (Alternate Secretary) (PNH)
- José Tomás Zambrano (1st Pro-Secretary) (PNH)
- Sara Ismena Medina Galo (2nd Pro-Secretary) (PNH)

=== 2010–2014 legislative period ===
The directive of the National Congress for the period 2010–2014 is:

- Juan Orlando Hernández (President) (PNH)
- Lena Gutiérrez Arévalo (1st Vice-President) (PNH)
- Marlon Lara (2nd Vice-President) (PLH)
- Ramón Velásquez Názar (3rd Vice-President) (DC)
- Marvin Ponce (4th Vice-President) (PUD)
- Martha Concepción Guevara (5th Vice-President)(PNH)
- Nora de Melgar (6th Vice-President) (PNH)
- Rigoberto Chang Castillo (1st Secretary) (PNH)
- Gladis Aurora López (2nd Secretary) (PNH)
- Eliseo Noel Mejía (Pro-Secretary) (PNH)
- Yariel Waldina Paz (Pro-Secretary) (PLH)
- Óscar Orlando Burgos (Alternate Vice-President) (PNH)
- Victoria Carrasco García (Alternate Vice-President) (PNH)
- Ángel Banegas (Alternate Secretary) (PLH)
- Milton de Jesús Puerto (Alternate Secretary) (PNH)

== Elections ==
The most recent election was held November 2025.

Party	Votes	%	Seats	+/–
National Party	7,138,761	35.29	49	+5
Liberal Party	6,988,261	34.55	41	+19
Liberty and Refoundation	4,912,816	24.29	35	–15
Innovation and Unity Party	634,168	3.14	2	+2
Christian Democratic Party	552,739	2.73	1	–
Total	20,226,745	100.00	128	0
Registered voters/turnout	6,522,577	–		
Source: CNE

(As each voter can cast many votes, the total number of votes cast cannot be used to assess the voter turnout percentage.)

== President ==
President of the National Congress of Honduras
- Presidente del Congreso Nacional de Honduras
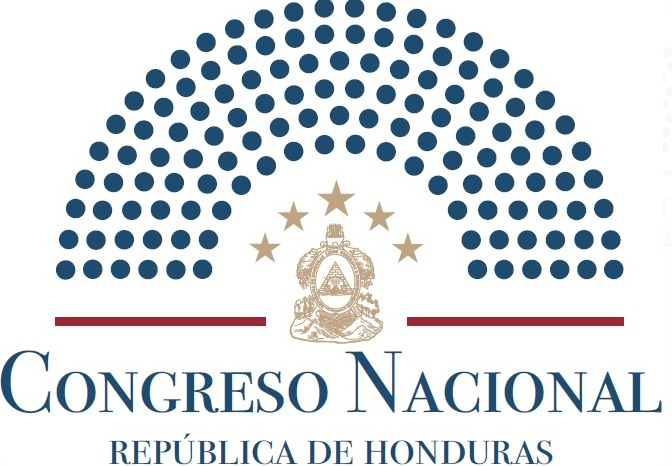
- Logo of the National Congress of Honduras
- Incumbent; Tomás Zambrano since 20 January 2026
- Style: Mister/Madam President
- Appointer: National Congress
- Term length: Four years
- Formation: 29 September 1865
- Deputy: Vice Presidents of the National Congress

The President of the National Congress of Honduras is the presiding officer (speaker) of the National Congress of Honduras.

=== Presidents of the Congress 1900–1982 ===
Name	Term	Party	Notes
Carlos Alberto Ucles	1900–1902		
Rafael Alvarado Guerrero	1902–1903		
Fausto Dávila	1904–1906		
Francisco Escobar	1911–1913		
Rafael Alvarado Manzano	1914–1915	National Party of Honduras	
Francisco Escobar	1915-1918		
Francisco Bográn	1919-1920		
Angel Ugarte	1921	Liberal Party of Honduras	
Miguel Oqueli Bustillo	1923	Liberal Party of Honduras	
Ángel Sevilla Ramírez	1924	National Party of Honduras	
Ramón Alcerro Castro	1924		President of the Constituent Assembly of 1924
Venancio Callejas	1925–1926	National Party of Honduras	
Tiburcio Carías Andino	1926–1929	National Party of Honduras	First Time
Antonio C. Rivera	1929–1930	National Party of Honduras	First Time
Tiburcio Carías Andino	1930–1931	National Party of Honduras	Second Time
Santiago Meza Cálix	1931–1932	Liberal Party of Honduras	
Antonio Bográn Mojeron	1932	National Party of Honduras	
Abraham Williams Calderón	1932	National Party of Honduras	
Miguel Paz Barahona	1933–1934	National Party of Honduras	
Ramón Alcerro Castro	1934–1935	National Party of Honduras	President of the Constituent Assembly of 1934
Antonio C. Rivera	1935–1939	National Party of Honduras	Second Time
Plutarco Muñoz P.	1939–1948	National Party of Honduras	
Luciano Milla Cisneros	1949	National Party of Honduras	
Juan B. Valladares Rodríguez	1949	National Party of Honduras	
Jose Máximo Gálvez	1949–1950	National Party of Honduras	
Camilo Gómez y Gómez	1950–1954	National Party of Honduras	
Francisco Salomón Jiménez Castro	1954	National Party of Honduras	
Ramón Villeda Morales	1957	Liberal Party of Honduras	President of the Constituent Assembly of 1957
Modesto Rodas Alvarado	1957–1963	Liberal Party of Honduras	He was overthrown by the military coup led by Oswaldo López Arellano.
Héctor Orlando Gómez Cisneros	1963	Liberal Party of Honduras	He assumed the Presidency of the Congress for a few days, after the military coup led by Oswaldo López Arellano
Mario E. Rivera López	1965–1971	National Party of Honduras	He was President of the National Constituent Assembly of 1965 and the National Congress from 1965 to 1971.
Martín Agüero Vega	1971–1972	National Party of Honduras	
Roberto Suazo Cordova	1981	Liberal Party of Honduras	He was the President of the National Constituent Assembly that drew up the 1982 Honduran Constitution. He was then elected President of Honduras in the Honduran general election, 1981

=== List of presidents since 1982 ===
Name	Term	Party
Efraín Bu Girón	1982–1986	Liberal Party of Honduras
Carlos Orbin Montoya	1986–1990	Liberal Party of Honduras
Rodolfo Irias Navas	1990–1994	National Party of Honduras
Carlos Roberto Flores	1994–1998	Liberal Party of Honduras
Rafael Pineda Ponce	1998–2002	Liberal Party of Honduras
Porfirio Lobo Sosa	2002–2006	National Party of Honduras
Roberto Micheletti	2006–2009	Liberal Party of Honduras
José Alfredo Saavedra	2009–2010	Liberal Party of Honduras
Juan Orlando Hernández	2010–2014	National Party of Honduras
Mauricio Oliva	2014–2022	National Party of Honduras
Luis Redondo	2022–2026	LIBRE
Tomás Zambrano	2026–present	National Party of Honduras

== See also ==
- Politics of Honduras
- Government of Honduras
- Supreme Court of Honduras
- Executive branch of the government of Honduras
- List of legislatures by country
