= Executive branch of the government of Honduras =

The Republic of Honduras is organized according to Title I: On the State of the Honduran Constitution of 1982. According to Title V: Branches of the Government, the three administrative branches are the legislative, executive and judicial. The legislative branch is the National Congress, which is elected by direct vote. Executive power is held by the president of Honduras or, in their absence, by one of the three vice-presidents. The judicial branch is composed of a supreme court, a court of appeals and other courts specified by the law.

== President ==
The president, the head of state, of government and supreme administrative authority, is chosen by its citizens. The current president is Nasry Asfura who was preceded by Xiomara Castro. The vice-presidents are María Antonieta Mejía, Carlos Flores Guifarro, and Diana Herrera.

=== Responsibilities ===
1. To comply with and enforce the Constitution, treaties and conventions, laws, and other legal provisions
2. To represent and direct the policies of the state
3. To safeguard the independence and honor of the republic and the integrity and inviolability of its territory
4. To maintain the peace and internal security of the republic and to repel attacks or external aggression
5. To freely appoint and dismiss secretaries and deputy secretaries of the cabinet, along with other officials and employees whose appointment is not assigned to other authorities
6. To convene the national congress in special sessions (through the permanent committee) or to propose the continuance of regular sessions
7. To restrict or suspend the exercise of rights in agreement with the Council of Ministers, subject to the constitution
8. To send messages to the congress at any time by personal appearance, and in writing when each legislative session begins
9. To participate in the enacting of laws by introducing bills in the congress through the secretaries of the cabinet
10. To give to the legislative and judicial powers and the supreme electoral tribunal the aid required to make their resolutions effective
11. To issue directives, decrees, regulations and resolutions according to law
12. To direct foreign policy and relations
13. To conclude treaties and agreements and to ratify (following approval by the congress) international treaties of a political and military nature, those relating to national territory and sovereignty and concessions, those entailing financial obligations for the public treasury, those requiring amendment or repeal of a constitutional or legal provision and those requiring legislation for implementation
14. To appoint (in accordance with the foreign-service law) the heads of diplomatic and consular missions, who shall be Honduran nationals by birth except for honorary posts or joint representatives of Honduras with other states
15. To receive the heads of foreign diplomatic missions and representatives of international organizations; to issue the exequatur to (and withdraw it from) consuls of other states
16. To command the armed forces the commander-in-chief and adopt measures necessary for the defense of the republic
17. To declare war and make peace during a recess of the congress, which must be subsequently convened
18. To oversee the official behavior of public officials and employees for the security and prestige of the government and state
19. To administer the public treasury
20. To adopt economic and financial measures when the national interest so requires and to give an account to the congress
21. To negotiate loans and conclude contracts following approval by the congress, when appropriate
22. To draw up the national development plan, discuss it with the council of ministers, submit it to the national congress for approval and direct and execute it
23. To regulate tariffs according to law
24. To pardon and commute sentences according to law
25. To confer declarations according to law
26. To ensure that state revenues are collected and to regulate their investment according to law
27. To publish a quarterly statement of income and expenditure of public revenue
28. To organize, direct, orient and promote public education, eradicate illiteracy and provide and improve technical education
29. To adopt measures for the promotion, recovery and rehabilitation of public health and the prevention of disease
30. To direct the economic and financial policy of the state
31. To supervise and control banks, insurance companies and investment houses through a national banking and insurance commission whose membership and operation shall be governed by law, and to appoint the president and vice-presidents of the state banks according to law
32. To prescribe measures and provisions to promote agrarian reform and improve productivity in rural areas
33. To sanction, veto, promulgate and publish laws approved by the congress
34. To direct and support economic and social integration, national and international, to improve the living conditions of the Honduran people
35. To create, maintain and suppress public services, taking necessary measures for their efficient operation
36. To confer military ranks from second lieutenant to captain, inclusive
37. To see that the armed forces are apolitical, professional and obedient
38. To issue and cancel naturalization papers authorized by the executive branch, according to law
39. To award pensions, bonuses and allowances, according to law
40. To confer legal status on civil organizations, according to law
41. To ensure harmony between capital and labor
42. To fix and revise the minimum wage, according to law
43. To permit or deny, following authorization by the congress, transit through Honduran territory of foreign troops
44. To permit (following authorization by the congress) the departure of Honduran troops to serve in foreign territory, in accordance with international treaties and conventions for the maintenance of peace
45. Other powers and duties conferred by the constitution and legislation

== Ministries and secretaries (since 2026) ==
- Sulmy Ortéz, minister of governance, justice and decentralization
- Ivette Argueta, minister of education
- Mireya Agüero, minister of foreign affairs
- Emilio Hernández Hércules, minister of finance
- Moisés Molina, minister of agriculture and livestock
- Enrique Rodríguez Burchard, minsiter of defence
- Gerson Velásquez, minister of security
- Nasry Asfura, president and minister of health
- Aníbal Ehrler, minister of infrastructure
- Fátima Juárez, minister of social development

== General budget ==
In January 2014, the government of Honduras approved a general budget of 183,635,281,000 lempiras ($9 billion), allocated as follows:

- 179.681 million for the executive branch
- 1.864 million for the judicial branch
- 2.089 million for the legislative branch

== See also ==
- Politics of Honduras
- Elections in Honduras
- Economy of Honduras
- Government of Honduras
- List of legislatures by country
- Honduras Presidential House
- Ministry of Finance (Honduras)
