= 2024 in Central America =

Guatemala, El Salvador, Honduras, Nicaragua, Costa Rica, Panama and Belize are historically the seven nations in Central America politically and geographically.

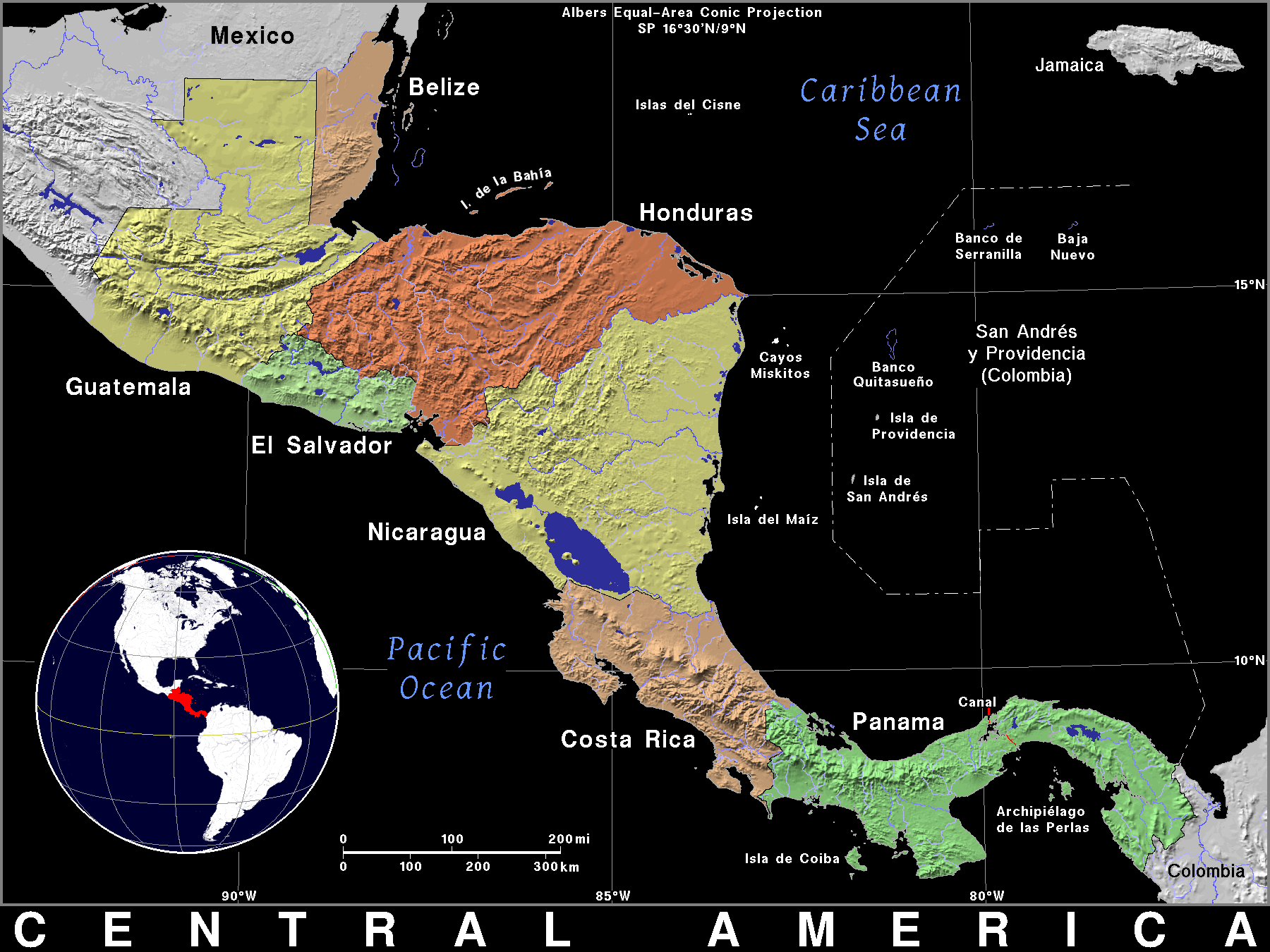
Central America geography

The following lists events of 2024 in Central America.

The combined population of Central America is estimated at 180.64 million (2023).

== Incumbents ==
=== Belize ===
(Belize)

- Monarch: Charles III
- Prime Minister: Johnny Briceño
- Governor-General: Dame Froyla Tzalam
- Chief Justice of Belize: Louise Blenman

=== Costa Rica ===
(Costa Rica)

- President: Rodrigo Chaves Robles
- First Vice President: Stephan Brunner
- Second Vice President: Mary Munive

=== El Salvador ===
(El Salvador)

- President: Nayib Bukele
- Vice President: Félix Ulloa

=== Guatemala ===
(Guatemala)

- President:Alejandro Giammattei
- Vice-president: Guillermo Castillo

=== Honduras ===
(Honduras)

- President: Xiomara Castro
- First Vice President: Salvador Nasralla
- Second Vice President: Doris Gutiérrez
- Third Vice President: Renato Florentino
- President of the National Congress: Luis Redondo

=== Nicaragua ===
(Nicaragua)

- President: Daniel Ortega
- Vice President: Rosario Murillo

=== Panama ===
(Panama)

- President: Laurentino Cortizo
- Vice President: José Gabriel Carrizo

== Events ==
=== Elections ===
- 4 February: 2024 Salvadoran presidential election
- 5 May – 2024 Panamanian general election

== Holidays ==
=== January to March ===
- January 1 – New Year's Day
- January 9 – Martyrs' Day (Panama)
- January 15 – George Price Day, Belize
- February 12–14 – Carnival, Panama
- March 11 – National Heroes & Benefactors Day, Belize. (in lieu of Saturday, 9 March)
- 28 March – Maundy Thursday, Nicaragua
- 29 March – Good Friday
- March 30 – Holy Saturday, Belize

=== April to June ===
- 1 April – Easter Monday
- 11 April – Juan Santamaría, Costa Rica
- 14 April – Americas Day, Honduras
- 29 April – Labour Day (in lieu of Wednesday, 1 May), Belize
- 1 May – Labour Day

=== July to September ===
- 19 July – Liberation Day, Nicaragua
- 25 July – Guanacaste Day, Costa Rica
- 1 August – Emancipation Day, Belize
- 2 August – Lady of the Angels Day, Costa Rica
- 15 August – Assumption Day, Mother's Day, Costa Rica
- 1 September – Day of the Black Person and Afro-Costa Rican Culture
- 10 September – St. George's Caye Day, Belize
- 14 September – Battle of San Jacinto, Nicaragua
- 15 September – Independence Day, Nicaragua
- 21 September – Independence Day, Belize

=== October to December ===
- 3 October – Francisco Morazán, Honduras
- 12 October – Discovery of America Day, Honduras
- 14 October – Indigenous Peoples’ Resistance Day (in lieu of Saturday, 12 October), Belize
- 20 October – Guatemalan Revolution
- 21 October – Army Day, Honduras
- 3 November – Separation of Panama from Colombia
- 5 November – Colon, Panama
- 10–11 November – Uprising of Los Santos, Panama
- 19 November – Garifuna Settlement Day, Belize
- 28 November – Independence of Panama from Spain
- 1 December – Army Abolition Day, Costa Rica
- 8 December – Mother's Day, Panama
- 8 December – Immaculate Conception, Nicaragua
- 20 December – National Mourning Day, Panama
- 25 December – Christmas Day
- 26 December – Boxing Day, Belize

== See also ==
- 2020s
- 2020s in political history
- List of state leaders in Central America in 2024
- Central American Parliament
