= 2025 in Central America =

Guatemala, El Salvador, Honduras, Nicaragua, Costa Rica, Panama and Belize are historically the seven nations in Central America politically and geographically.

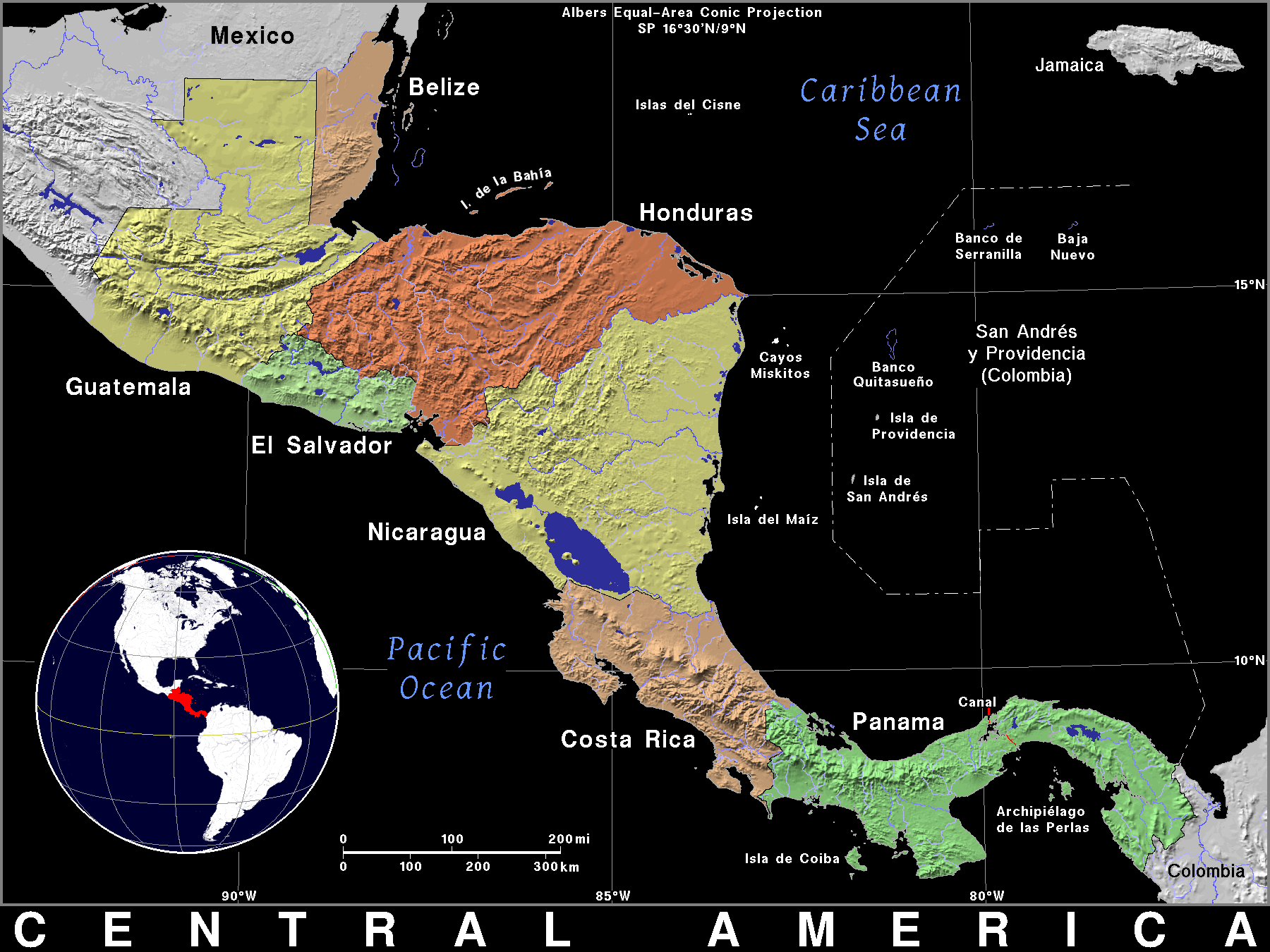
Central America geography

The combined population of Central America is estimated at 183.40 million (2024).

The following lists events of 2025 in Central America.

== Sovereign states ==
=== Belize ===
(Belize)

- Monarch: Charles III (2022–present)
- Prime Minister: Johnny Briceño (2020–present)
- Governor-General: Dame Froyla Tzalam (2021–present)
- Chief Justice of Belize: Louise Blenman (2022–present)

=== Costa Rica ===
(Costa Rica)

- President: Rodrigo Chaves Robles (2022–present)
- First Vice President: Stephan Brunner (2022–2025)
- Second Vice President: Mary Munive (2022–2025)

=== El Salvador ===
(El Salvador)

- President: Nayib Bukele (2019–present)
- Vice President: Félix Ulloa (2019–present)

=== Guatemala ===
(Guatemala)

- President: Bernardo Arévalo (2024–present)
- Vice-president: Karin Herrera (2024–present)

=== Honduras ===
(Honduras)

- President: Xiomara Castro (2022–present)
- First Vice President: Doris Gutiérrez (2024–present)
- Second Vice President: Renato Florentino (2022–present)
- President of the National Congress: Luis Redondo (2022–present)

=== Nicaragua ===
(Nicaragua)

- President: Daniel Ortega (2007–present)
- Vice President: Rosario Murillo (until 2025); vacant (from 2025)

=== Panama ===
(Panama)

- President: José Raúl Mulino (2024–present)
- Vice President: vacant

== Dependencies ==
- San Andrés and Providencia (Colombia)

== Holidays ==
=== January to March ===
- January 1 – New Year's Day
- January 9 – Martyrs' Day (Panama)
- January 15 – George Price Day, Belize
- March 3 – Carnival, Panama
- March 10 – National Heroes & Benefactors Day, Belize. (in lieu of Sunday, 9 March)

=== April to June ===
- 11 April – Juan Santamaría, Costa Rica
- 14 April – Americas Day, Honduras
- 17 April – Maundy Thursday, Nicaragua
- 18 April – Good Friday
- 19 April – Holy Saturday, Belize
- 21 April – Easter Monday
- 1 May – Labour Day

=== July to September ===
- 19 July – Liberation Day, Nicaragua
- 25 July – Guanacaste Day, Costa Rica
- 1 August – Emancipation Day, Belize
- 2 August – Lady of the Angels Day, Costa Rica
- 15 August – Assumption Day, Mother's Day, Costa Rica
- 1 September – Day of the Black Person and Afro-Costa Rican Culture
- 10 September – St. George's Caye Day, Belize
- 14 September – Battle of San Jacinto, Nicaragua
- 15 September – Independence Day, Guatemala, Honduras, El Salvador, Nicaragua, and Costa Rica
- 22 September – Independence Day, Belize (in lieu of Sunday 21 September)

=== October to December ===
- 3 October – Francisco Morazán, Honduras
- 12 October – Discovery of America Day, Honduras
- 13 October – Indigenous Peoples’ Resistance Day (in lieu of Sunday, 12 October), Belize
- 20 October – Guatemalan Revolution
- 21 October – Army Day, Honduras
- 3 November – Separation of Panama from Colombia
- 5 November – Colon, Panama
- 10–11 November – Uprising of Los Santos, Panama
- 19 November – Garifuna Settlement Day, Belize
- 28 November – Independence of Panama from Spain
- 1 December – Army Abolition Day, Costa Rica
- 8 December – Mother's Day, Panama
- 8 December – Immaculate Conception, Nicaragua
- 20 December – National Mourning Day, Panama
- 25 December – Christmas Day
- 26 December – Boxing Day, Belize

== See also ==
- 2020s
- 2020s in political history
- Central American Parliament
- List of state leaders in Central America in 2025
