= Walter López =

Walter López is the name of:

- Walter López (footballer, born 1977) (1977–2015), Honduran footballer
- Walter López (footballer, born 1985), Uruguayan footballer
- Walter Adolfo López (born 1971), Guatemalan footballer, see Deportivo Marquense
- Walter López Reyes, (1940-2022), Honduran politician, Vice President of Honduras
- Walter López Castellanos (born 1980), Guatemalan football referee
