= Honduras–Taiwan relations =

Taiwan–Honduras relations

- Taiwan: Honduras

Honduras–Taiwan relations are foreign relations between Honduras and Taiwan. Honduras maintained official diplomatic relations with Taiwan from 1941 to 2023. Relations between Honduras and China began on 26 March 2023. As of 2026, Honduras does not officially recognize Taiwan, instead recognizing the People's Republic of China as the one official government of China but still maintains unofficial relations with Taiwan.

== History ==
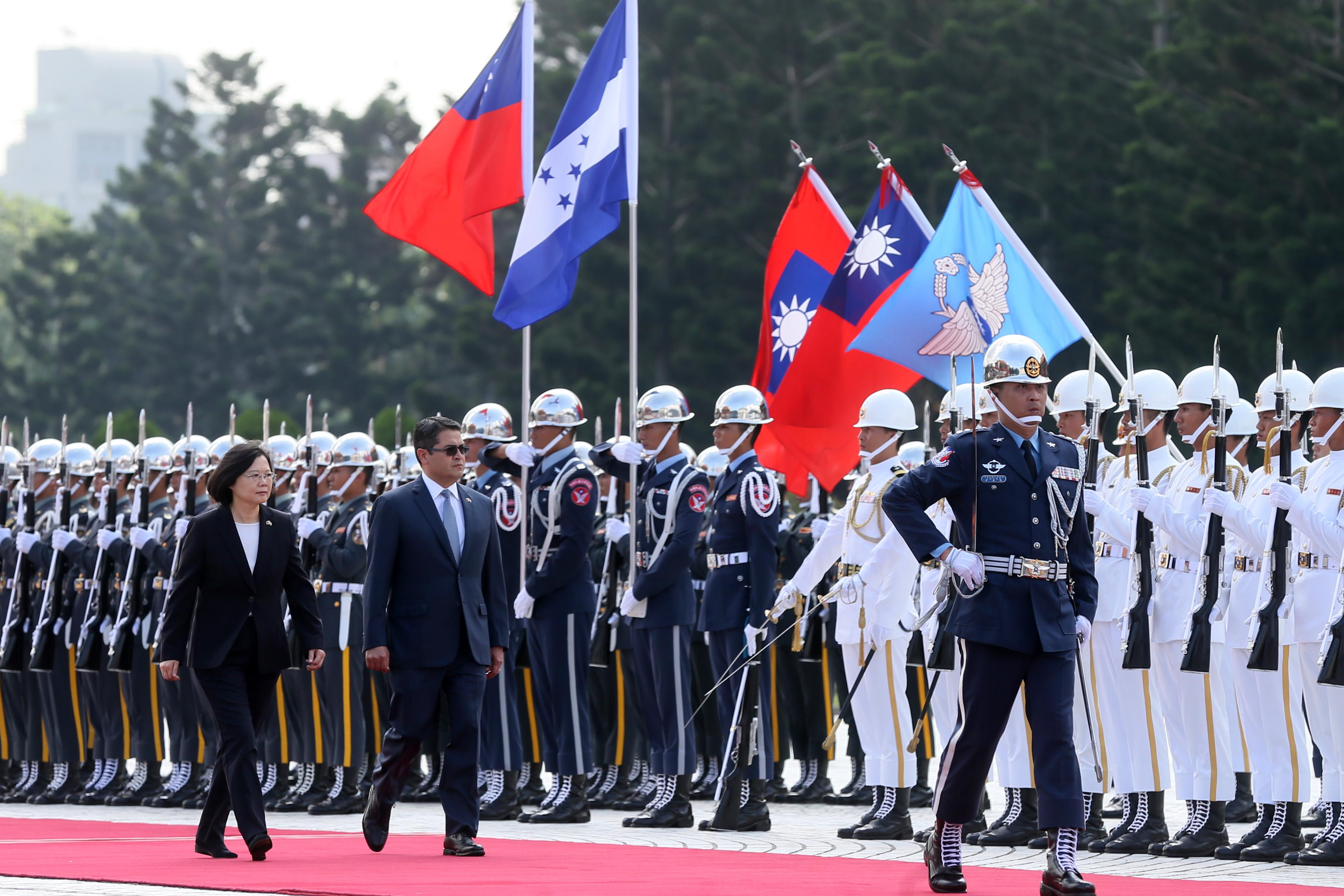
Meeting between Taiwanese President Tsai Ing-wen and Honduran President Juan Orlando Hernández in October 2016.)

The Honduran Foreign Ministry began to maintain formal diplomatic relations with Taiwan under the Empire of Japan in 1935, under the dictatorship of General Tiburcio Carias Andino. Taiwan's relationship with Honduras continued after Japan was defeated in WW2 and the the Republic of China took over the rule of the island in 1945.

On 12 November 2021, Honduran President Juan Orlando Hernández visited Taiwan for a 3-day trip to celebrate the 80th anniversary of diplomatic ties.

During the campaign for the 2021 Honduran general election, candidate Xiomara Castro stated her wished to establish diplomatic relations with China, at the expense of Taiwanese authorities.

On 26 March 2023, Honduras's Foreign Ministry posted on Twitter Inc. announcing the severance of official diplomatic ties with Taiwan and the establishment of ties with China.

Before the tie break, Taiwan was a major market for Honduras, especially the whiteleg shrimp. In 2022, almost 40% of Honduras's whiteleg shrimp exports went to Taiwan. After the diplomatic shift, Honduran shrimp exports to Taiwan plummeted, reportedly affected more than 14,000 workers in the industry.

One year after the tie break in March 2024, the Taiwanese government stopped providing scholarships for Honduran students, leaving 90 Honduran students in Taiwan without financial support.

In 2025, opposition presidential candidate Nasry Asfura stated that Honduras was “100 times better off” when it maintained diplomatic relations with Taiwan. He pledged that, if elected, he would restore diplomatic ties with Taiwan and forge partnerships with the United States, Taiwan, and Israel in order to revitalize the Honduran economy.

According to a 2026 report by Taiwan News, Honduras still owes Taiwan more than US$400 million more than three years after cutting diplomatic ties with Taipei and recognizing Beijing.
