= China–Honduras relations =

- China: Honduras

The Republic of Honduras and the People's Republic of China (PRC) have maintained diplomatic relations since 2023. However, diplomatic relations with China date back to 1941 when the Republic of China (ROC) controlled the mainland; under the One China policy since 1949, Honduras maintained relations with the ROC on Taiwan for an additional 74 years until it shifted recognition to the PRC in 2023. China has an embassy in Tegucigalpa. Honduras has an embassy in Beijing.

== History ==
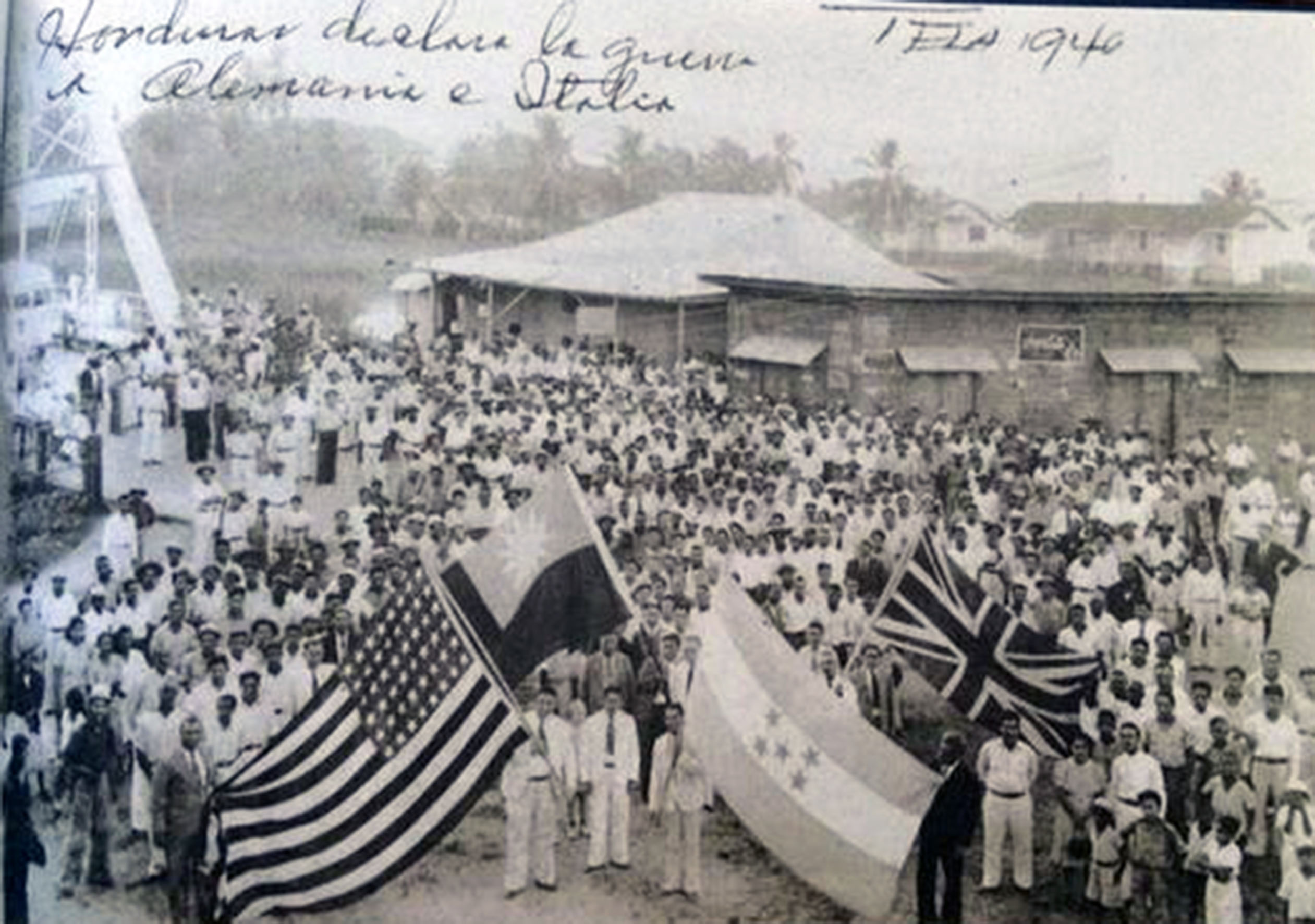
Celebration for Honduras' decision to join the Allies During the Second World War on the upper left side the flag of the Chinese Republic under the Kuomintang.

The Republic of Honduras and the Nationalist government of China based in Chongqing (Chungking) entered diplomatic relations on April 9, 1941, but continued after the Chinese government lost the Chinese Civil War to the Communists and decamped to Taiwan, formerly a Qing prefecture ceded to Japan from 1895 to 1945. Relations with the two countries were upgraded to ambassadorial level on May 20, 1965. Honduras established an embassy in Taipei in June 1985 and sent a full-time ambassador.

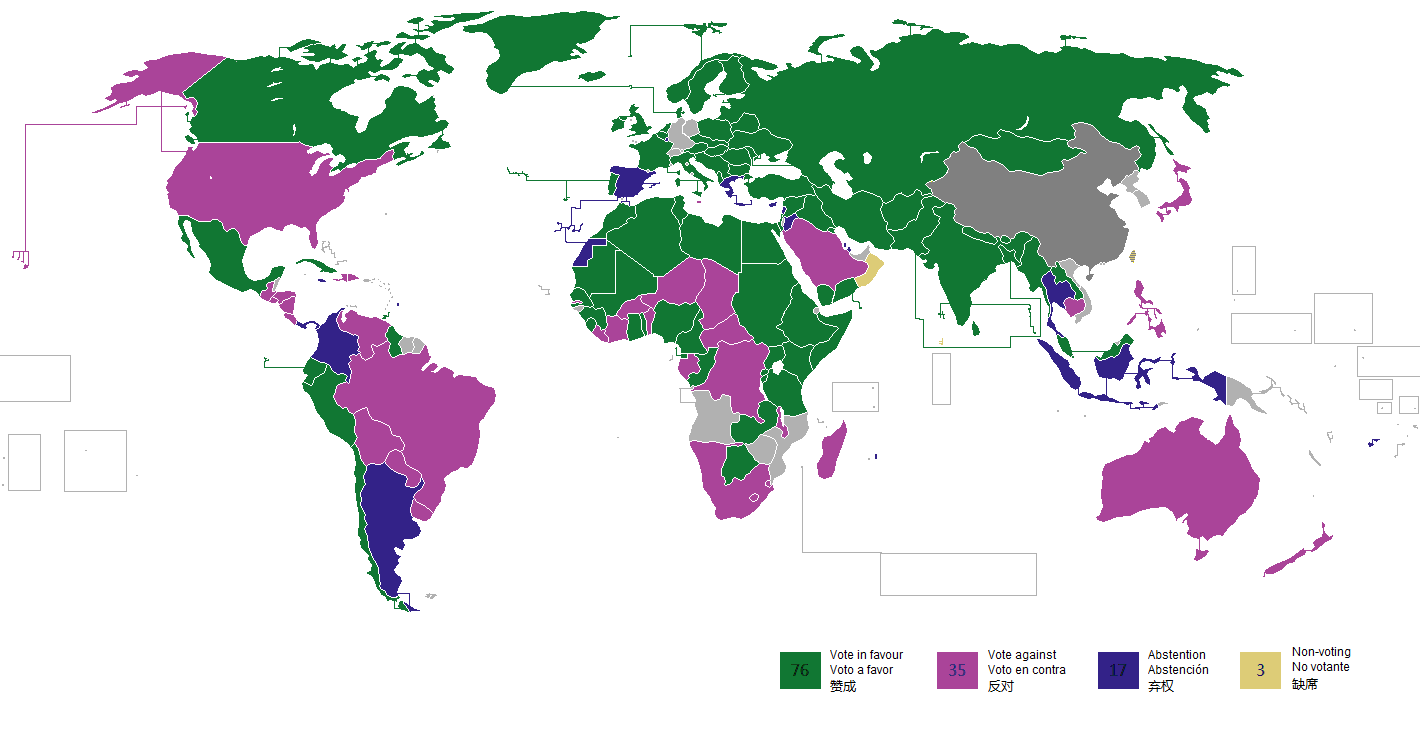
Honduras voted against Resolution 2758, which removed the Republic of China from the United Nations.

On 1 January 2023, Honduran foreign minister Enrique Reina met with Chinese Vice Minister of Foreign Affairs Xie Feng on the sidelines at the inauguration of Brazilian President Luiz Inácio Lula da Silva in Brazil. The encounter sparked concerns by the Taiwan government that Beijing was persuading Honduras to switch to recognizing China over Taiwan.

On 14 March, Honduran President Xiomara Castro announced that she had directed her foreign minister to begin the process of opening official relations with the People's Republic of China. During her presidential campaign in the 2021 Honduran general election, Castro had referenced the possibility of Honduras cutting its relations with the Taiwan and beginning relations with the People's Republic of China, although as recently as January 2022 she had stated a desire for Honduras to maintain ties with Taiwan. The Chinese foreign ministry stated that it welcomed President Castro's announcement, noting China's position that "[o]n the basis of the One-China principle, China is willing to develop friendly and cooperative relations with Honduras and other countries in the world."

On 26 March, Honduras formally broke ties with Taiwan and established ties with the PRC. According to Taiwan Foreign Minister Joseph Wu, Taiwan had ended its relations with Honduras to "safeguard its sovereignty and dignity."

On 5 June, China officially inaugurated its embassy in Honduras and it opened on 11 June. During the embassy opening, General Secretary of the Chinese Communist Party Xi Jinping announced that China is willing to begin talks on a free trade agreement with Honduras "as soon as possible".

== Economic relations ==
According to the Central Bank of Honduras, Honduras's exports to China totaled $24.7 million in 2020. In 2022, bilateral trade reached almost $1.589 billion.

In March 2023, Honduras announced that it was negotiating with China to build a hydroelectric dam, Patuca II.

== See also ==
- Honduras–Taiwan relations
- Foreign relations of China
- Foreign relations of Honduras
- Foreign relations of Taiwan
