= Fátima Juárez =

Honduran lawyer and politician

Minister of Social Networks
- Incumbent
- Assumed office 27 January 2026
- President: Nasry Asfura
- Preceded by: José Carlos Cardona Erazo

Personal details
- Born: Santa Bárbara, Honduras
- Occupation: lawyer and politician

Fátima Idalma Juárez Padilla is a Honduran lawyer and politician. She has been serving as Minister of Social Networks of Honduras since 2026.

== Career ==
Juárez was the mayor of her hometown Santa Bárbara between 2018 and 2022. She became acting president of the National Party of Honduras in January 2024.

She was appointed by newly elected President Nasry Asfura as the new Minister of Social Networks, and Juárez was sworn in on 27 January 2026.
