= Ivette Argueta =

Honduran educator and politician

Minister of Education
- Incumbent
- Assumed office 27 January 2026
- President: Nasry Asfura
- Preceded by: Jaime Atilio Rodríguez Peñalva

Personal details
- Occupation: politician

Ivette Arely Argueta Padilla is a Honduran educator and politician. She has been serving as Minister of Education of Honduras since 2026.

== Career ==
Argueta has a background in education and administrative management and holds a ,aster’s degree in science. She has spent her professional career in the education sector and has served as director of the Department of Environmental Education and Health at the Ministry of Education.

She was appointed by newly elected President Nasry Asfura as the new Minister of Education, and she was sworn in on 27 January 2026. In the run-up to the teachers’ strike called for 9 February 2026, the Ministry for Education had to deny a rumour claiming that Argueta had threatened to dismiss and deport from the country any teachers who took part in the demonstration on grounds of terrorism.
