= Marcelino Ponce Martínez =

Honduran politician (1920s–2003)

1st Vice President of Honduras
- In office 1982–1986
- President: Roberto Suazo Cordova
- Preceded by: René Bendaña Meza
- Succeeded by: Alfredo Fortín Inestroza

Personal details
- Died: February 2003
- Party: Liberal Party

Marcelino Ponce Martínez (1920s – February 2003) was Vice President of Honduras during the administration of Roberto Suazo Cordova. He was from the Liberal Party.

== Career ==
Ponce Martínez was the mayor of La Ceiba from 1958 to 1960. He was the director of the civil guard from 1960 to 1963, during the presidency of Ramón Villeda Morales.

He was also the first presidential designate aka Vice President from 1982 to 1986, in the government of Roberto Suazo Córdova, when Honduras returned to the democratic system after 18 years of military regimes.

He was 80 years old when he died on cancer in February 2003, so he was born about 1922–1924. His son, Marco Antonio Ponce, has been a deputy in the National Congress twice.
