= Vicente Williams Agasse =

Politician of Honduras

1st Vice President of Honduras
- In office January 2002 – January 2006
- President: Ricardo Maduro
- Preceded by: William Handal Raudales
- Succeeded by: Elvin Santos

Personal details
- Born: 6 June 1935 (age 90) Tegucigalpa
- Party: National Party of Honduras
- Parent: Abraham Williams Calderón (father)

Vicente Williams Agasse is Honduran politician. He was Vice President of Honduras during the administration of Ricardo Maduro from 2002 to 2006. He was the first vice president aka first presidential designate. He is from the National Party.

Williams was born on 6 June 1935 in Tegucigalpa.

Williams is a banker and civil engineer by profession. He is a son of Abraham Williams Calderón.
