= César Castellanos (politician) =

Honduran politician (1947–1998)

César Armando Castellanos Madrid
- Died: November 1, 1998
- Cause of death: Helicopter accident
- Burial place: Jardines de Paz Suyapa, Tegucigalpa, Honduras
- Education: National Autonomous University of Honduras
- Occupations: Politician, Doctor, Surgeon
- Title: Mayor of Tegucigalpa
- Successor: Vilma Reyes Escalante
- Political party: National Party of Honduras
- Spouse: Vilma Reyes Escalante
- Children: César Castellanos, Jorge Castellanos

César Castellanos (November 1, 1947 – November 1, 1998), known as El Gordito Trabajador, was a Honduran politician and Mayor of Tegucigalpa for the National Party at the time of his death. He died when the helicopter he was traveling in crashed due to entangling with electrical wires while he was inspecting damage caused by Hurricane Mitch.
