= Ricardo Álvarez Arias =

Honduran politician

Ricardo Antonio Álvarez Arias
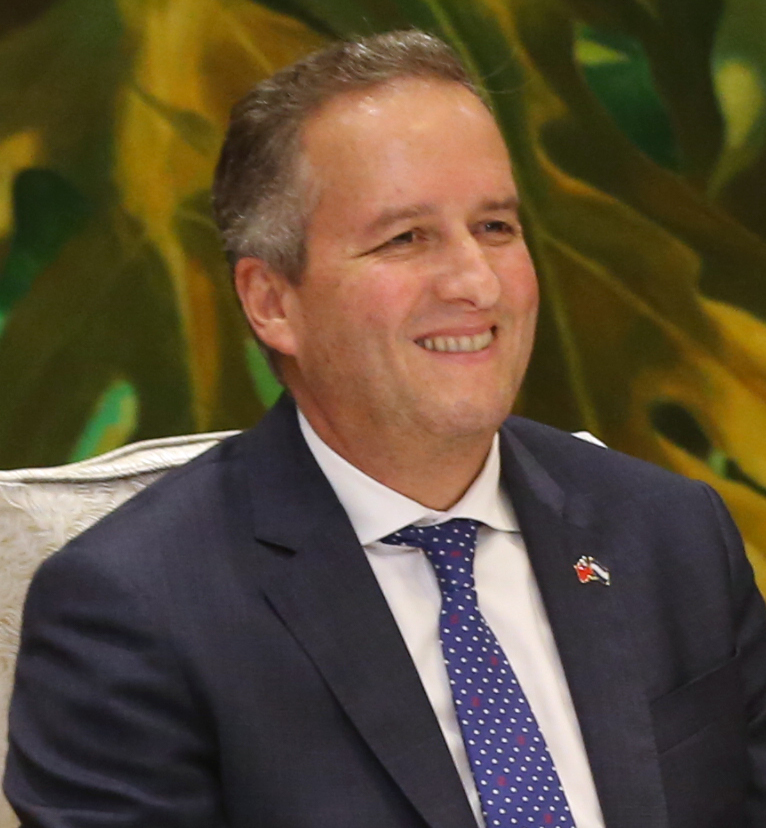

First Vice President of Honduras
- In office 27 January 2014 – 27 January 2022
- President: Juan Orlando Hernández
- Preceded by: María Antonieta de Bográn
- Succeeded by: Salvador Nasralla

Mayor of Tegucigalpa
- In office 25 January 2006 – 25 January 2014
- Preceded by: Miguel Pastor
- Succeeded by: Nasry Asfura

Personal details
- Born: 4 February 1963 (age 63) Panama City, Panama
- Education: University of St. Thomas (Texas) (BBA); University of St. Thomas (Texas) (MBA)

Ricardo Antonio Álvarez Arias (born 4 February 1963) is a businessman and the former mayor of Tegucigalpa and the former First Vice President of Honduras.

He ran for Mayor of Tegucigalpa and won the 2005 elections and was re-elected on the 2009 elections representing the National Party of Honduras. In 2012, Álvarez ran for the National Party nomination for president, ultimately losing to Juan Orlando Hernández. Hernández named him his vice presidential candidate, and together they won the 2013 elections. He is named in the trial for links to the Los Cachiros cartel.

Political offices
Preceded by Miguel Pastor	Mayor of Tegucigalpa; 2006–2014	Succeeded by Nasry Asfura
Preceded by María Antonieta de Bográn	1st Vice President of Honduras; 2014–2022	Succeeded by Salvador Nasralla
