= Ministry of Human Rights, Justice, Governance and Decentralization =

Established as early as 1826, the Ministry of Human Rights, Justice, Governance and Decentralization of Honduras was created from the territorial division of Honduras and was initially composed of seven departments. The ministry is responsible for matters pertaining to the internal government, which include the following:

- The coordination, liaison, supervision and evaluation of the departmental and municipal regimes
- Monitoring political parties with regard to their relationship with the government
- Publishing laws, regulations and general provisions
- The extrajudicial solution of conflicts and the coordination and liaison with the organs of the Judicial Power, Public Ministry, Attorney General of the Republic, National Electoral Court and the State Controlling Institutions

The ministry has been called by different names over the course of its history. For instance, in 2014, President Juan Orlando Hernández announced plans to eliminate the Ministry of Justice and Human Rights and merge it with the Ministry of Interior. Certain sources refer to the Minister of Human Rights, Justice, Governance and Decentralization as the Secretariat.

== List of ministers (1990–present) ==
=== Minister of Governance & Justice ===
- Enrique Ortez Colindres (1989–1990)
- Jose Francisco Cardona Arguelles (1991–1993)
- Celin Discua (1993–1994)
- Efrain Moncada Silva (1994–1998)
- Delmer Urbizo Panting (1998–1999)
- Enrique Flore Valeriano (2000–2001)

=== Minister of Interior & Justice ===
- Vera Sofia Rubi (2001–2002)
- Jorge Ramon Hernandez Alcerro (2002–2005)

=== Minister of Governance & Justice ===
- Jose Roberto Pacheco Reyes (2005–2006)
- Jorge Arturo Reina (2006–2008)
- Victor Orlando Meza Lopez (2008–2010)
- Africo Madrid (2010–2012)

=== Minister of Justice and Human Rights ===
- Ana Pineda (2012–2014)

=== Minister of Human Rights, Justice, & Decentralization ===
- Rigoberto Chang Castillo (2014–2016)

=== Minister of Human Rights, Justice, Governance and Decentralization ===
- Héctor Leonel Ayala Alvarenga (2016–2018)
- Karla Cuevas (2018–2021)

=== Minister of Governance, Justice and Decentralization ===
- Sulmy Ortéz (2026–present)

== See also ==
- Ministry of justice
- Secretaría de Gobernación (Honduras) [Ministry of the Interior (Honduras)]
- Politics of Honduras
