= Sulmy Ortéz =

Honduran politician and civil servant

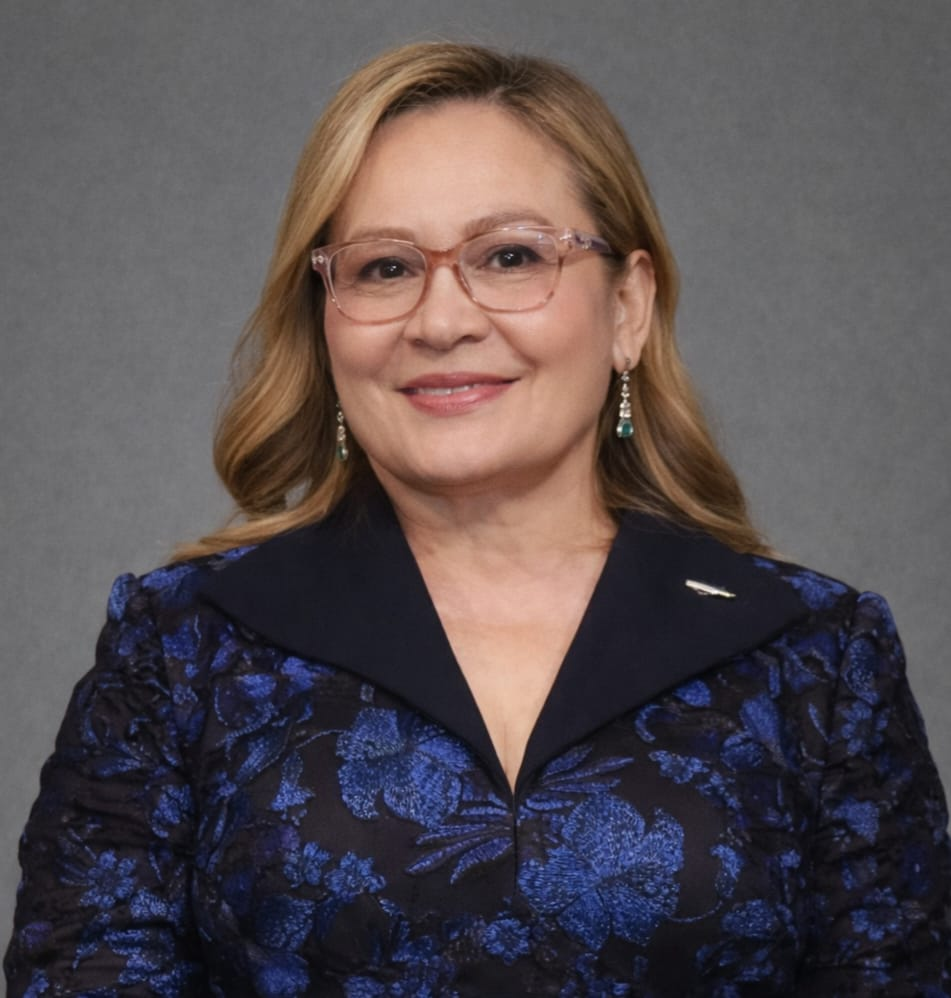
- Official portrait, 2026

Minister of Governance, Justice and Decentralization
- Incumbent
- Assumed office 27 January 2026
- President: Nasry Asfura
- Preceded by: Tomás Vaquero

Personal details
- Occupation: politician

Sulmy Yamileth Ortéz Maldonado is a Honduran civil servant and politician. She has been serving as Minister of Governance, Justice and Decentralization of Honduras since 2026.

== Career ==
Ortéz is from southern Honduras. She has training and professional experience in strategic planning for public institutions, finance, public administration and organisational management. In August 2018 she was appointed deputy director of institutional development at the National Penitentiary Institute.

She was appointed by newly elected President Nasry Asfura as the new Minister of Governance, Justice and Decentralization, and she was sworn in on 27 January 2026. She was the first minister to take office and presided over the swearing-in ceremonies for ministers Mireya Agüero and Emilio Hernández Hércules.
