= Karla Cuevas =

Honduran politician

Minister of Justice
- In office 16 January 2018 – 22 January 2021

Karla Cuevas is a Honduran politician who served as the minister of human rights, justice, governance and decentralization from 2018 to 2021. She resigned on 22 January 2021.
