= William Handal Raudales =

Honduran politician (1945–2024)

1st Vice President of Honduras
- In office January 1998 – January 2002
- President: Carlos Roberto Flores
- Preceded by: Walter López Reyes
- Succeeded by: Vicente Williams Agasse

Personal details
- Born: 1945
- Died: 3 September 2024 (aged 78–79)
- Party: Liberal Party

William Ulric Handal Raudales (24 March 1945 - 3 September 2024) was Vice President of Honduras during the administration of Carlos Roberto Flores from 1998 to 2002. He was the first vice president aka first presidential designate. He is from the Liberal Party.

Handal was an engineer by profession. He was of Palestinian origin.

He died on 3 September 2024.
