= Arístides Mejía =

Honduran politician

Vice President Commissioner of Honduras
- In office 1 February 2009 – 28 June 2009
- President: Manuel Zelaya
- Preceded by: Elvin Santos
- Succeeded by: María Antonieta de Bográn (as First Vice President); Samuel Armando Reyes (as Second Vice President); Victor Hugo Barnica (as Third Vice President)

Personal details
- Born: 30 January 1960 (age 65)
- Party: Liberal Party (Until 2011) (2019-Present); LIBRE (2011-2019)

Arístides Mejía Carranza (born July 30, 1960) served as the Vice President Commissioner of Honduras from 1 February 2009 until 28 June 2009. The position of "Vice President Commissioner" was created by former President Manuel Zelaya after then-Vice President Elvin Santos resigned in late 2008. Arístides Mejía didn't fully occupied the charge, he was a Presidential Commissioner not a vice-president since he was appointed by President Zelaya and not popularly elected.

== Biography ==
He is a son of Arístides Mejía and Orfilia Carranza. He was a lawyer at the National Autonomous University of Honduras. He was the Honduran Ambassador to Greece (1994–1998). Mejía was a part-time legal adviser of the International Organization for Migration (1999–2002), and the executive director of the Program for Modernization of the Administration of Justice. (1998–2003). He was the President and Judge of the Supreme Electoral Tribunal (2004–2005) and served as Secretary of National Defense from January 2006 until January 2009 under the presidency of Manuel Zelaya. He is married and father of three children: two daughters and a son. He speaks Spanish, French and English.

After the 2009 Honduran coup d'état Arístides Mejía chose to exile himself and do diplomatic work abroad to restore Manuel Zelaya in the presidency. As a consequence of the 2009 Honduran coup d'état, an arrest warrant was issued in Honduras for abuse of authority. Interpol however deemed that the warrant was due to political causes and declined to cooperate with the Honduran police force. On April 9, 2010, the charges were definitely dropped against him.

Political offices
Preceded by Elvin Santos	Vice President of Honduras; 2009	Succeeded by María Antonieta de Bográn (1st Vice President); Samuel Armando Reyes Rendon (2nd Vice President); Victor Hugo Barnica (3rd Vice President)
Preceded by Frederico Brevé Travieso	Defense Minister of Honduras; 2006-2009	Succeeded by Edmundo Orellana
