= Olga Margarita Alvarado =

Honduran politician (born 1981)

Olga Margarita Alvarado Rodríguez
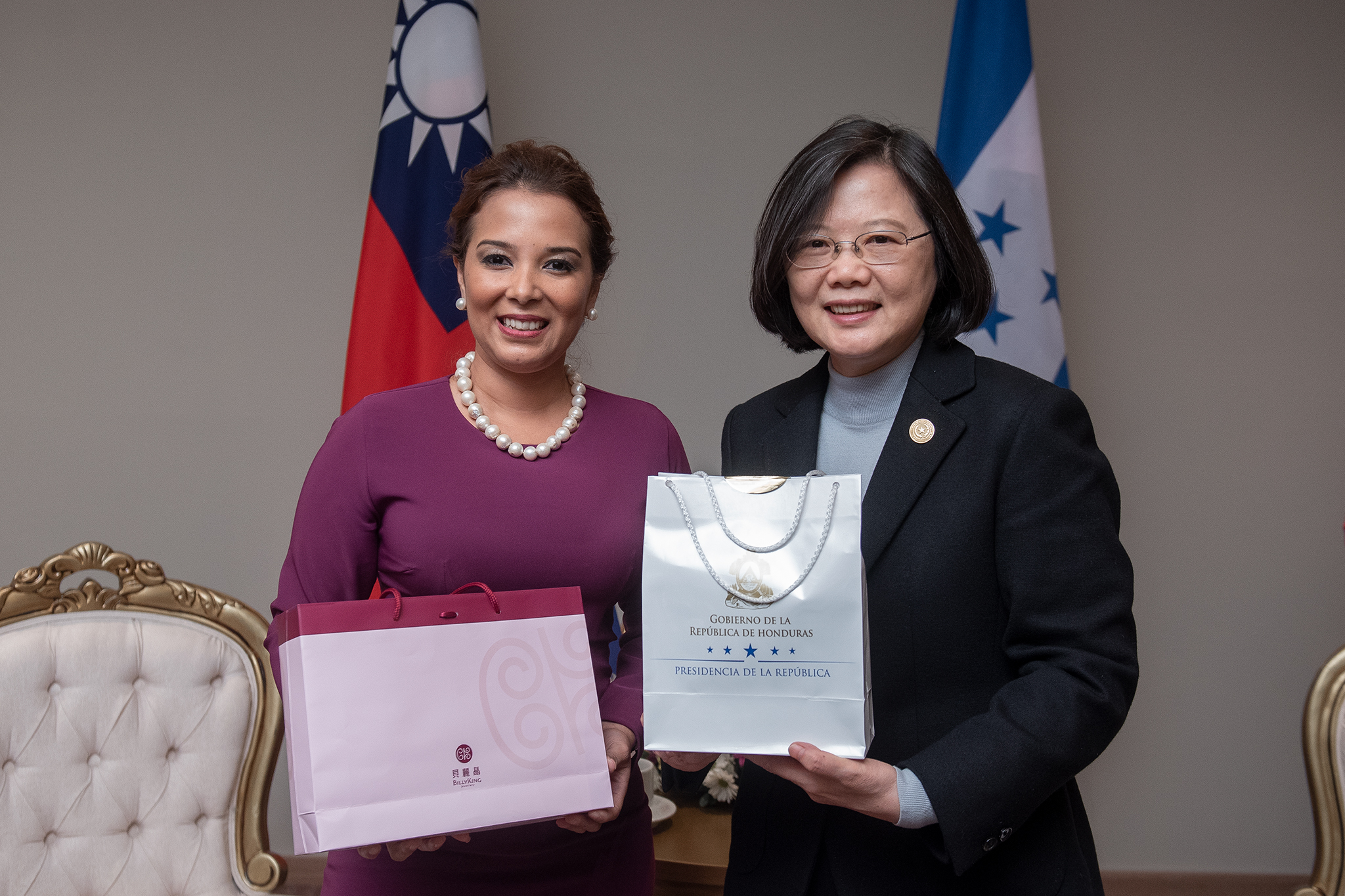
- Alvarado on left

3rd Second Vice President of Honduras
- In office 26 January 2018 – 27 January 2022
- President: Juan Orlando Hernández
- Preceded by: Ava Rossana Guevara
- Succeeded by: Doris Gutiérrez

Personal details
- Born: 22 November 1981 (age 44)
- Party: National Party
- Education: Catholic University of Honduras

Olga Margarita Alvarado Rodríguez (born 22 November 1981) is a Honduran politician who served as Vice President of Honduras under Juan Orlando Hernández from 2018 to 2022. She is from the National Party.

Alvarado was born on 22 November 1981. She graduated as a business administrator from the Catholic University of Honduras. She served as undersecretary and secretary of state in the youth offices, in the government of President Porfirio Lobo Sosa, directing youth policies and implementing the Youth Initiative project. From January 2015 to May 2017, she served as an undersecretary for policies and inclusion at the secretariat for social inclusion development (Sedis). She has carried out aid programs such as Ciudad Mujer.

Alvarado was elected as Vice President of Honduras of Honduras in the 2017 elections, and took office in January 2018.
