= María Antonieta de Bográn =

Honduran politician

María Antonieta Guillén de Bográn

First Vice President of Honduras
- In office 27 January 2010 – 27 January 2014 Serving with Samuel Armando Reyes Rendon and Victor Hugo Barnica
- President: Porfirio Lobo Sosa
- Preceded by: Arístides Mejía (Vice President Commissioner)
- Succeeded by: Ricardo Álvarez

Personal details
- Born: 13 July 1955 (age 69); Honduras
- Political party: National Party

María Antonieta de Bográn (born 13 July 1955) served as First Vice President of Honduras. She was one of the three candidates for Vice President of Honduras with the National Party in the 2009 Honduran elections, and also served as that party's national chairperson during those elections. President-elect Porfirio Lobo Sosa won the election with approximately 55% of the vote.

She was described as the right hand of the Porfirio Lobo administration, and with the additional position as minister of the presidency, she led important state policies in various areas of the administration.

She was the director of institute of tourism during the administration of Rafael Callejas 1990–1994.

Political offices
Preceded by Arístides Mejía (Vice President Commissioner)	1st Vice President of Honduras; 2010–2014	Succeeded by Ricardo Álvarez
