= María Antonieta Mejía =

First Vice President of Honduras since 2026

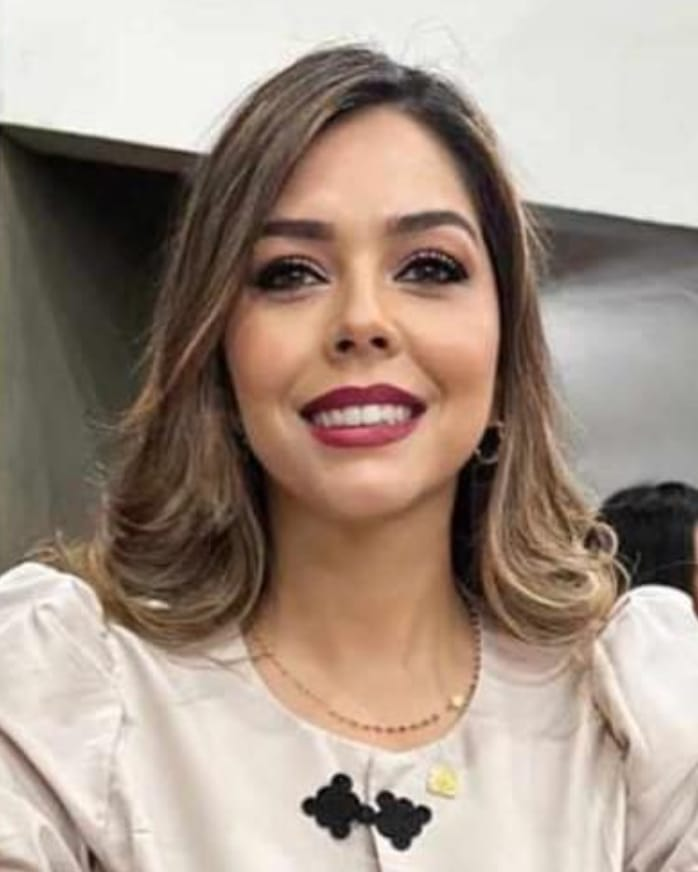
- Mejía in 2026

First Vice President of Honduras
- Incumbent
- Assumed office 27 January 2026 Serving with Carlos Flores Guifarro and Diana Herrera
- President: Nasry Asfura
- Preceded by: Salvador Nasralla (2024)

Vice President of the National Party
- Incumbent
- Assumed office 24 May 2025
- President: Nasry Asfura

Member of the National Congress of Honduras
- In office 25 January 2022 – 25 January 2026
- Constituency: Francisco Morazán Department

Personal details
- Born: María Antonieta Mejía Sánchez; 15 May 1981 (age 45) San Marcos de Colón, Choluteca, Honduras
- Party: National
- Children: 2
- Education: Autonomus University of Honduras (BBA)
- Occupation: Business manager; politician

María Antonieta Mejía Sánchez (born 15 May 1981) is a Honduran politician serving as First Vice President of Honduras since 2026. She previously served as member of the National Congress for the National Party of Honduras.

== Career ==
Mejía got a degree in business administration Universidad Nacional Autónoma de Honduras and got a master's degree in human resources-oriented business management. During the Juan Orlando Hernández's presidency, she worked in various state secretaries and previously worked in the Secretary of Finance, between 2010 and 2014.

Mejía workes also as journalist in the US for Univision and the KQED FM at KQED Forum in the San Francisco Bay Area.

Mejía was elected member of the National Congress of Honduras in the 2021 general election, representing Francisco Morazán Department for the National Party of Honduras. Her belligerent interventions against Xiomara Castro's government led her to become a popular politician.

=== First Vice President of Honduras (2026–present) ===
In August 2024, Mejía was announced as the vice president on Nasry Asfura's ticket for the 2025 presidential election for National Party of Honduras. In October 2024, alongside Diana Herrera and Carlos Flores Guifarro, Mejía was confirmed as one of the three vice presidents in the National Party primary election campaign led by Asfura, which took place on 9 March 2025.

On 24 December 2025, after one month of controversial vote count, Mejía was declared First Vice President-elect of Honduras after the victory of Nasry Asfura's ticket. On 21 January 2026, Mejía received the credentials for her elected position from the National Electoral Council.

Mejía was sworn in on 27 January 2026.

== Personal life ==
She speaks her native Spanish, English and Portuguese.

Political offices
Preceded by Salvador Nasralla	First Vice President of Honduras; 2026–present	Incumbent
