= Carlos Flores Guifarro =

Second Vice President of Honduras since 2026

Second Vice President of Honduras
- Incumbent
- Assumed office 27 January 2026 Serving with María Antonieta Mejía and Diana Herrera
- President: Nasry Asfura
- Preceded by: Doris Gutiérrez

Personal details
- Born: Carlos Alberto Flores Guifarro; 25 December 1970 (age 55) Tegucigalpa, Honduras
- Party: National
- Occupation: Plastic surgeon; politician

Carlos Alberto Flores Guifarro (born 25 December 1970) is a Honduran plastic surgeon and politician serving as Second Vice President of Honduras since 2026.

== Career ==
Flores was born on 25 December 1970 in Tegucigalpa, Honduras, the son of a priest and a nun who renounced their vows to marry. He is a renowned plastic surgeon.

In October 2024, alongside Diana Herrera and María Antonieta Mejía, Flores was confirmed as one of the three vice presidents in the National Party of Honduras primary election campaign led by Asfura, which took place on 9 March 2025.

=== Second Vice President of Honduras (2026–present) ===
On 24 December 2025, after one month of controversial vote count, Flores was declared Second Vice President-elect of Honduras after the victory of Nasry Asfura's ticket. On 21 January 2026, Flores received the credentials for his elected position from the National Electoral Council.

Flores was sworn in on 27 January 2026.

== Personal life ==
Flores enjoys Christian music, baseball, reading, and movies, and is a deeply devout Christian.

== Citations ==
Political offices
Preceded by Doris Gutiérrez	Second Vice President of Honduras; 2026–present	Incumbent
