= Doris Gutiérrez =

Honduran lawyer and politician (born 1947)

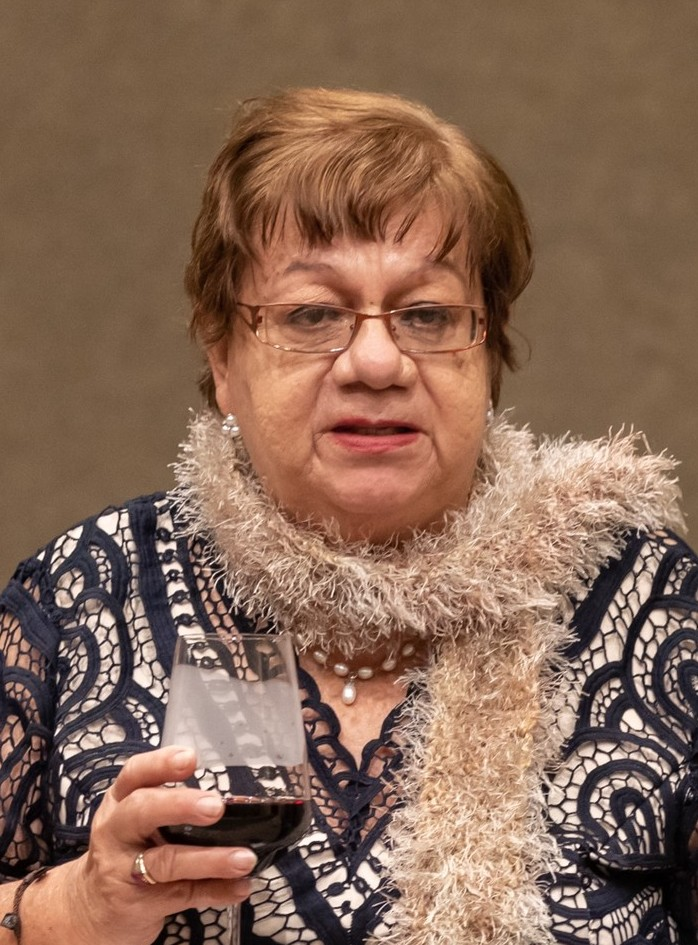
- Gutiérrez in 2022

Second Vice President of Honduras
- In office 27 January 2022 – 27 January 2026 Serving with Salvador Nasralla (2022–2024) and Renato Florentino
- President: Xiomara Castro
- Preceded by: Olga Margarita Alvarado
- Succeeded by: Carlos Flores Guifarro

Member of the National Congress of Honduras
- In office 25 January 2006 – 28 June 2009
- In office 25 January 2014 – 25 January 2022

Personal details
- Born: Doris Alejandrina Gutiérrez; 21 August 1947 (age 79) Comayagüela, Honduras
- Party: Innovation and Unity
- Relatives: José de la Paz Herrera (brother)
- Education: Universidad Nacional Autónoma de Honduras; Universidad Tecnológica de Honduras
- Occupation: Politician, lawyer

Doris Alejandrina Gutiérrez (born 21 August 1947) is a Honduran lawyer and politician who served as Second Vice President of Honduras from 2022 to 2026. She was previously a representative in the National Congress of Honduras belonging to the Innovation and Unity Party.

== Biography ==
Doris Gutiérrez was born on 21 August 1947 in Comayagüela, and is the daughter of Martha Gutiérrez and Armando Uclés Sierra, and sister to José de la Paz Herrera. She was raised by her single mother and grandmother. Gutiérrez completed her primary studies at the Universidad José Cecilio del Valle, then graduated from the Sacred Heart Institute in Tegucigalpa as a teacher with high marks, going on to win further academic honors while studying education. She found her first teaching job in Trinidad, in the Santa Bárbara Department, and would work here for 14 years teaching. While working with organized labor she decided to enter politics and in 1995, she joined the Democratic Unification Party as the substitute deputy of Matías Fúnez.

In December 2015, Gutiérrez was awarded the Maya Award by the Mexican Institute of Evaluation.

In early March 2016, Gutiérrez announced two new projects: to have the Gualcarque river declared an area of National Heritage and to officially declare Berta Cáceres, who worked to protect the river, a national heroine and name the area after her.

In the aftermath of a 2017 student demonstration at the Faculty of Medical Sciences at the Universidad Nacional Autónoma de Honduras following the charging of Cesario Padilla, Moisés Cáceres, and Sergio Ulloa with usurpation by the Honduran Supreme Court, Gutiérrez found herself amongst other politicians accused of orchestrating the demonstration by Julieta Castellanos.

== Citations ==
Political offices
Preceded by Olga Margarita Alvarado	Second Vice President of Honduras; 2022–2026; Served alongside: Salvador Nasralla and Renato Florentino	María Antonieta Mejía
