= Diana Herrera =

Third Vice President of Honduras since 2026

Third Vice President of Honduras
- Incumbent
- Assumed office 27 January 2026 Serving with María Antonieta Mejía and Carlos Flores Guifarro
- President: Nasry Asfura
- Preceded by: Renato Florentino

Personal details
- Born: Diana Waleska Herrera Portillo; 31 May 1976 (age 49) Concepción de María, Choluteca, Honduras
- Party: National
- Occupation: Businesswoman; politician

Diana Waleska Herrera Portillo (born 31 May 1976) is a Honduran businesswoman and politician serving as Third Vice President of Honduras since 2026.

== Career ==
Herrera is from La Guarama village, in Choluteca Department.

She was confirmed by Asfura as one of his vice presidential candidates on 6 October 2024. Two days later, on 8 October 2024, alongside María Antonieta Mejía and Carlos Flores Guifarro, Asfura confirmed his ticket for the National Party of Honduras primary election campaign led by Asfura, which took place on 9 March 2025.

=== Third Vice President of Honduras (2026–present) ===
On 24 December 2025, after one month of controversial vote count, Herrera was declared Third Vice President-elect of Honduras after the victory of Nasry Asfura's ticket. On 21 January 2026, Herrera received the credentials for her elected position from the National Electoral Council.

Herrera was sworn in on 27 January 2026.

== Citations ==
Political offices
Preceded by Renato Florentino	Third Vice President of Honduras; 2026–present	Incumbent
