= Walter López Reyes =

Honduran politician and general

First Vice President of Honduras
- In office 1994–1998
- President: Carlos Roberto Reina
- Preceded by: Jacobo Hernández Cruz
- Succeeded by: William Handal Raudales

Personal details
- Died: 12 February 2022 (aged 81)

Military service
- Allegiance: Honduras
- Branch/service: Honduran Navy
- Rank: General

Walter López Reyes (died 12 February 2022) was a Honduran Navy general and politician. He served as first vice president of Honduras from 1994 to 1998.

López Reyes died on 12 February 2022, at the age of 81.
