= Vilma Reyes Escalante =

Honduran politician

Antoinette Vilma Reyes Escalante is a dentist and former Honduran politician. In 1998, she became the mayor of Tegucigalpa and held the position for four years; during this time she was involved in a political scandal over the embezzlement of public funds.

Escalante was born in Santa Bárbara to a large family of eight children who relocated to Tegucigalpa in the 1970s. There she spent her childhood, attended college, and met her husband, Cesar Castellanos Madrid, who was later elected mayor of the Central District of Honduras in 1997. In 1998, after his untimely death in a helicopter crash, Escalante took over the post and presided there until 2002.

Escalante's work as mayor included the creation of El Vaso de Leche, a program for alleviating the suffering of poor children in the squatted informal settlements of Honduras. In 1999 she met with Marisabel Rodriguez, wife of the president of Venezuela, Hugo Chavez. Rodriguez donated several million bolivars to the project, but a later investigation concluded that the funds were never spent on those who needed it. None of the accusations seemed to harm her political career; she was elected a deputy of the National Congress of Honduras from 2006–2010, and has represented Honduras in the Central American Parliament.
