= Nasry Asfura =

President of Honduras since 2026

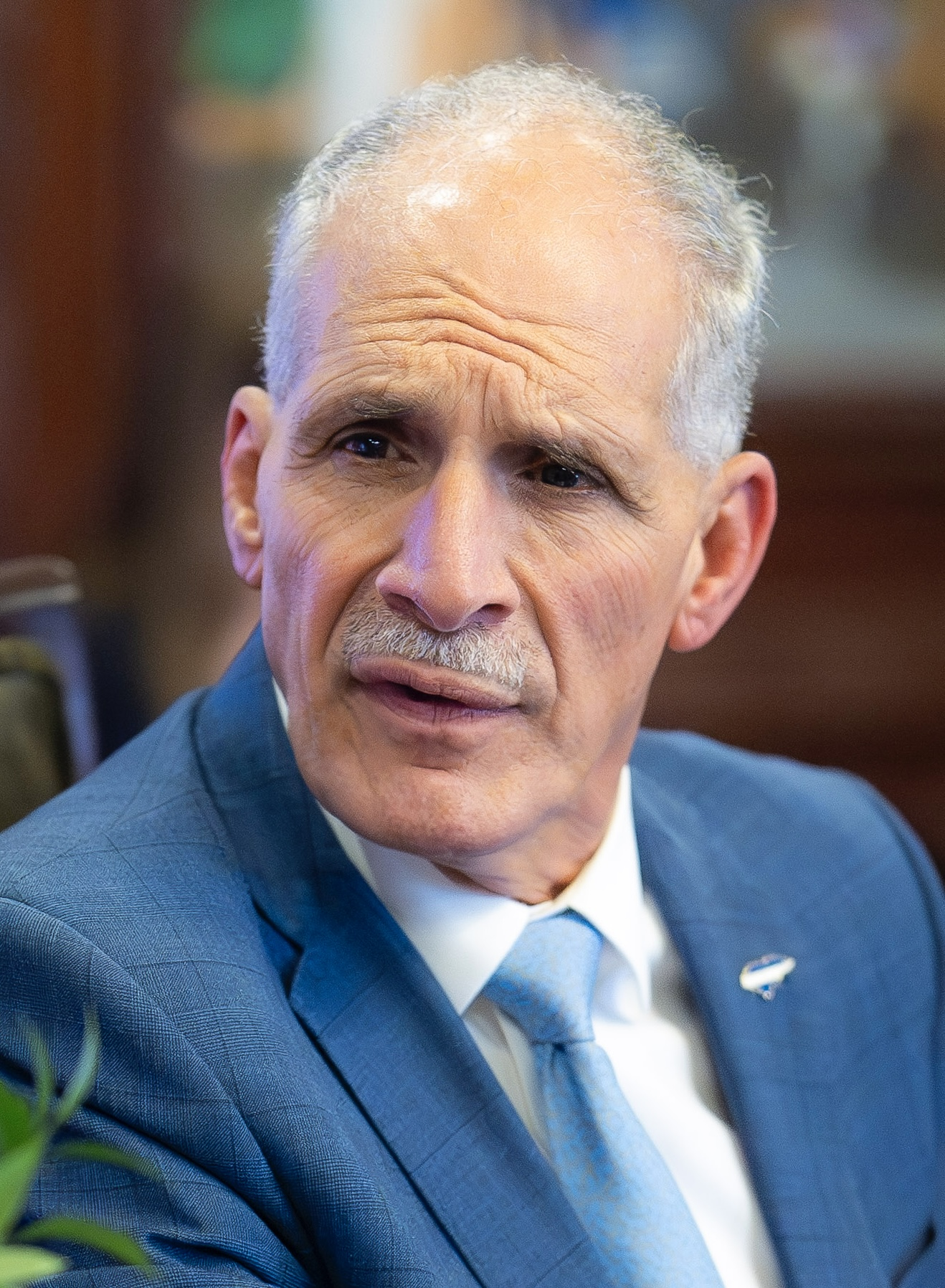
- Asfura in 2026

President of Honduras
- Incumbent
- Assumed office 27 January 2026
- Vice President: 1st Vice President María Antonieta Mejía; 2nd Vice President Carlos Flores Guifarro; 3rd Vice President Diana Herrera
- Preceded by: Xiomara Castro

Minister of Health
- Incumbent
- Assumed office 27 January 2026
- President: Himself
- Preceded by: Carla Paredes

President of the National Party
- Incumbent
- Assumed office 24 May 2025
- Vice President: María Antonieta Mejía
- Preceded by: David Chávez

Mayor of Tegucigalpa
- In office 25 January 2014 – 25 January 2022
- Vice Mayor: Juan García
- Preceded by: Ricardo Álvarez Arias
- Succeeded by: Jorge Aldana
Additional offices
Member of the National Congress of Honduras for Francisco Morazán
In office 25 January 2010 – 25 January 2014
Director of the Honduran Social Investment Fund
In office 25 January 2010 – 10 September 2011
President	Porfirio Lobo Sosa
Preceded by	Carlos Banegas
Succeeded by	Gunther von Wiese
Councilman of Tegucigalpa
In office 2006–2010

Personal details
- Born: Nasry Juan Asfura Zablah; 8 June 1958 (age 68) Tegucigalpa, Honduras
- Party: National
- Spouse: Lissette del Cid (m. 1985)
- Children: 3
- Education: National Autonomous University of Honduras (Incomplete)

Nasry Juan Asfura Zablah (Latin American Spanish: [ˈnasɾi ˈxwan asˈfuɾa saˈbla]; born 8 June 1958) is a Honduran politician and construction businessman serving as the president of Honduras since 2026. A member of the National Party of Honduras (PNH), he previously served as the mayor of Tegucigalpa from 2014 to 2022.

In October 2020, an anti-corruption unit of the Public Prosecutor's Office requested criminal prosecution against Asfura, alleging that he was responsible for the embezzlement of 17.4 million lempiras for his own benefit between 2017 and 2018, as well as for other crimes. In June and July of the following year, the request was dismissed by the Criminal Chamber of the Supreme Court of Justice. In October 2021, his name appeared in the Pandora Papers.

A construction industry magnate, he previously served as a deputy in the National Congress of Honduras, representing the Francisco Morazán department from 2010 to 2014. Asfura ran in the 2021 presidential election, losing to Xiomara Castro of the Liberty and Refoundation party. After becoming the PNH's party president, he ran and won the 2025 presidential election, narrowly defeating Salvador Nasralla of the Liberal Party. He was sworn in on 27 January 2026.

== Early life and career ==
Nasry Juan Asfura Zablah was born on 8 June 1958 in Tegucigalpa, Honduras, the son of Nasry Juan Asfura and Gloria Zablah de Asfura. His mother Gloria died in 2019, while his father Nasry died before 2015. He is the grandson of Christian Palestinian immigrants from Bethlehem, with his paternal grandparents arriving in Honduras in the late 1890s and his maternal grandparents in 1918. His family nicknamed him affectionately "Tito" from "Nasryto".

Asfura graduated from high school at the San Francisco Institute and studied civil engineering at the National Autonomous University of Honduras, but quit his course to instead pursue a career in the construction industry.

== Political career (1990s–2026) ==
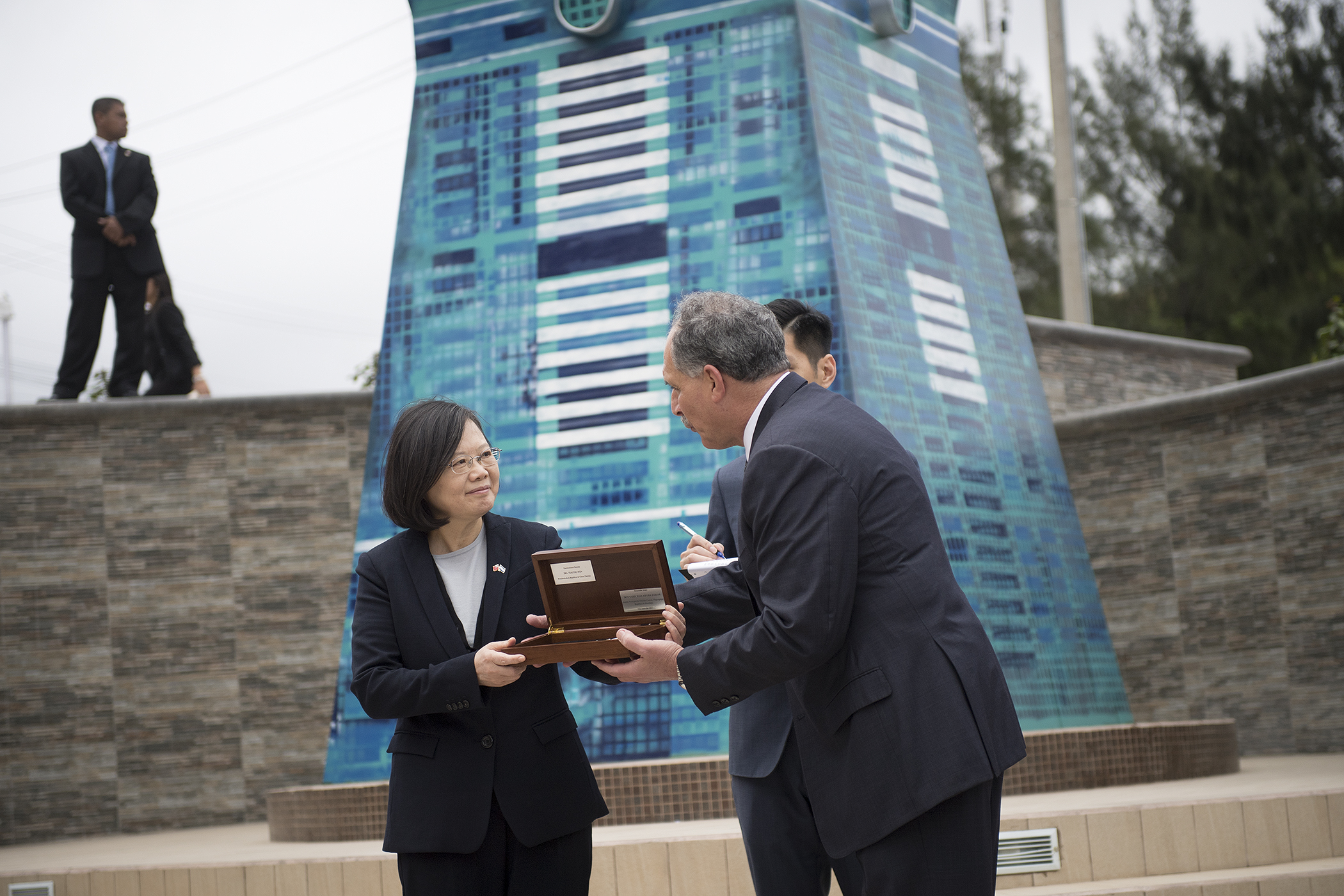
Asfura with Taiwanese president Tsai Ing-wen, in January 2017

Asfura first became involved in politics and entered into public life in the 1990s. Between 1990 and 1994, served as a municipal tax assistant in the capital, and as an assistant to Mayor Nora Gúnera de Melgar. He was also a member of the administration of the mayors César Castellanos Madrid and Vilma Reyes.

In 2005 Asfura participated in the PNH's internal elections as a pre-candidate for mayor of the Central District, but was defeated by Ricardo Álvarez. During those elections, he ended an impromptu radio announcement with the phrase that slipped out of his mouth, "Papi a la orden!" (Daddy at your service!), which became his nickname. Álvarez became mayor of the capital in the general elections that year, and Asfura became a councilman in his administration.

He ran in the 2009 general election and was elected as a member of the country's National Congress, representing the department of Francisco Morazán. He served in that position from 2010 to 2014, when he left to serve as mayor of Honduras' capital Tegucigalpa. During his tenure as mayor, Asfura became known for his road infrastructure projects. He would continue in the position until 2022. In May 2025, Asfura became the National Party's president, succeeding David Chávez.

=== 2021 presidential campaign ===
Asfura was chosen as the 2021 presidential candidate for the incumbent National Party. He defeated Mauricio Oliva in the party's primary election. At the beginning of the campaign, polls indicated a tight race between Asfura and his left-wing opponent, Xiomara Castro, the leader of LIBRE and the wife of the former president Manuel Zelaya, but she went on to win the election by a comfortable margin.

Asfura prioritized upgrades to infrastructure and job creation. In addition, Asfura pledged support towards the business, health, education, and manufacturing sectors.

=== 2025 presidential campaign ===
Asfura was once again nominated by the National Party to be its candidate in the 2025 presidential election. He defeated Ana García Carías in the party's primary election. He was endorsed by United States President Donald Trump and Argentine President Javier Milei, with Trump's administration pledging to reduce its foreign aid to Honduras if Asfura was not elected the country's president. During the campaign, Asfura spent time in Washington, D.C. to demonstrate his alignment with the Trump administration's foreign policy. He also pledged to bring "development and opportunities for everyone", to "facilitate foreign and domestic investment into the country", and "generate employment for all". He pledged to restore Honduras's ties with Taiwan, who were broken in 2023 in order to establish ties with mainland China.

Asfura won the election, obtaining 40.3% of the vote. The election results were marred by delays, with opposition candidates Salvador Nasralla and Rixi Moncada criticizing the vote counting process. He became the most voted candidate in the history of the National Party. Under his leadership, the PNH won a plurality in the country's National Congress, obtaining 49 seats and 34.51% of the vote.

== Presidency (2026–present) ==
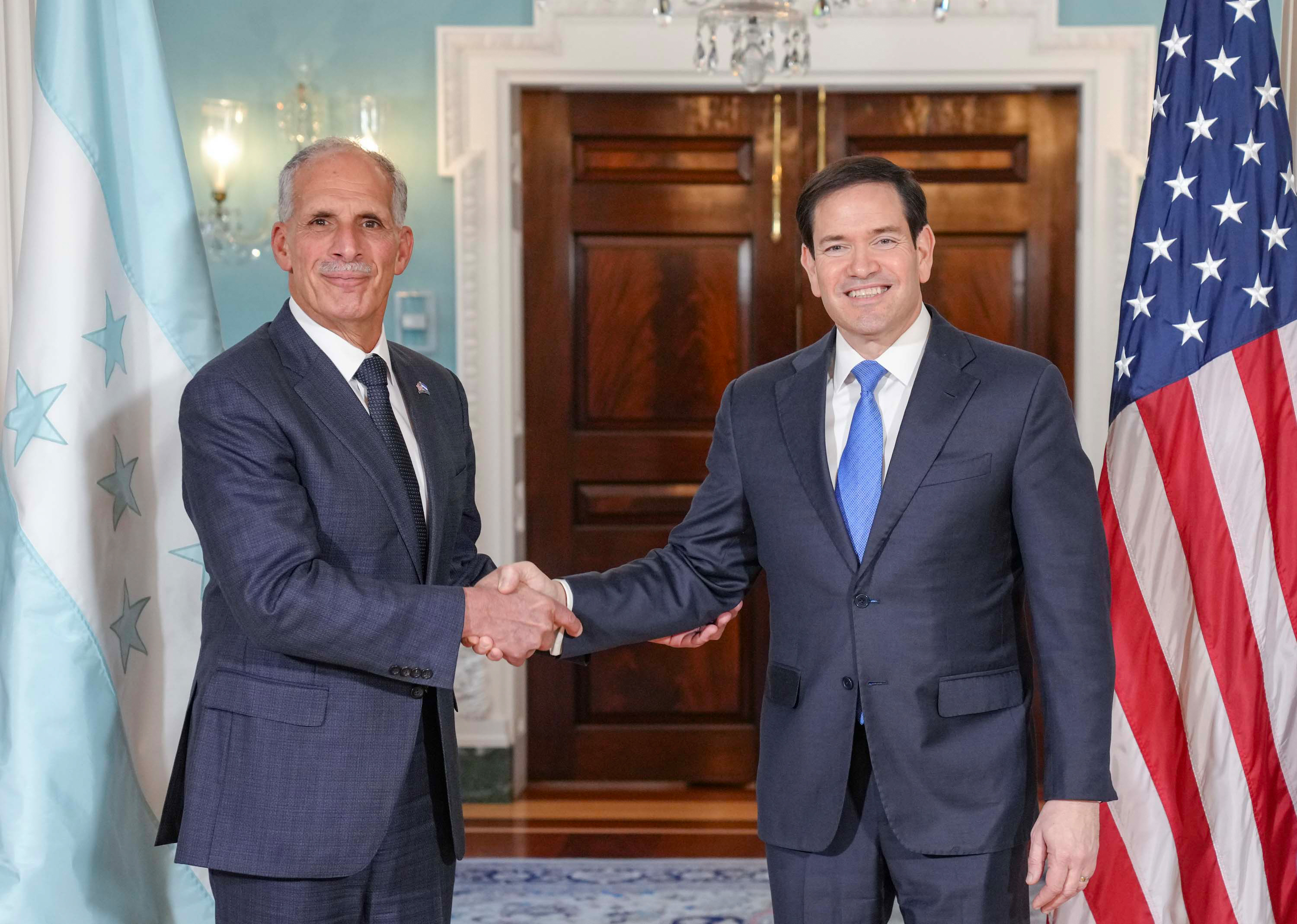
Asfura with US Secretary of State Marco Rubio in January 2026

- Presidency of Nasry Afura; 27 January 2026 – present
- Vice President: María Antonieta Mejía, Carlos Flores Guifarro, Diana Herrera
- Cabinet: Asfura's Cabinet
- Party: National
- Election: 2025
- Seat: Presidential Palace
- Flag of Honduras

María Antonieta Mejía, one of Asfura's elected vice presidents, reported on 26 December, just a month before his inauguration, that Asfura will assume the presidency in a ceremony in the National Congress, unlike the traditional inauguration at the National Stadium, stating that he wants a "symbolic and unostentatious" event, to refrain from a ceremony "that will have a large budget".

On 21 January 2026, Asfura and his three vice presidents received the credentials for their elected positions from the National Electoral Council.

He was sworn in on 27 January 2026 alongside Minister of Health in the National Congress. Asfura is the oldest president to take office. No foreign dignitaries were invited to the ceremony, and outgoing President Xiomara Castro did not attend.

In June 2026, Asfura's approval rating is 31%.

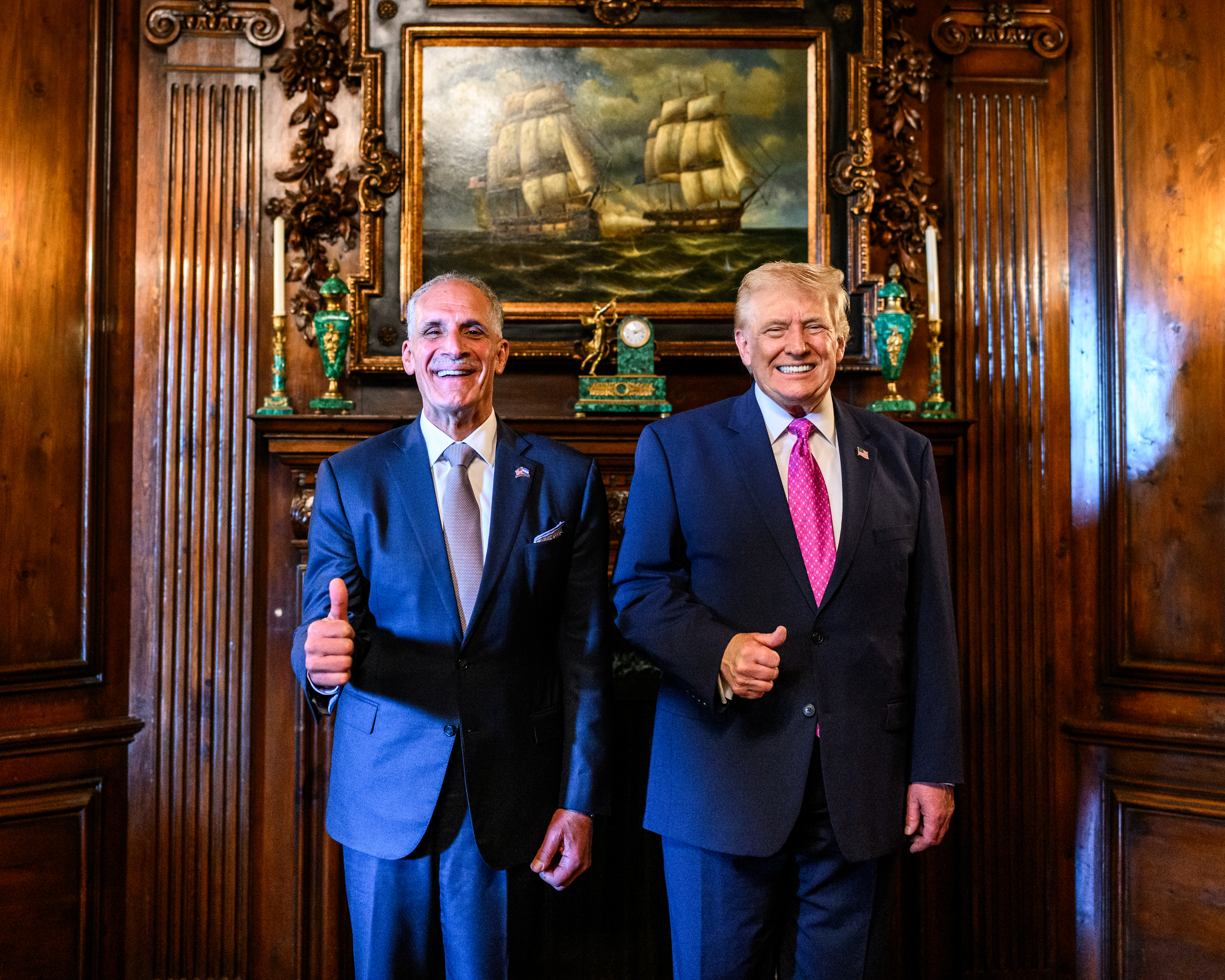
Asfura with US President Donald Trump in February 2026

=== Foreign policy ===
==== Taiwan and People's Republic of China ====
During the 2025 presidential campaign, Asfura pledged to restore diplomatic relations between Honduras and Taiwan, which had been severed in 2023 by the government of his predecessor Xiomara Castro in favor of establishing relations with the People's Republic of China. Asfura said that Honduras had been "100 times better off" when it maintained diplomatic relations with Taiwan and proposed strengthening relations with Taiwan and the United States.

Following his inauguration in January 2026, Asfura ordered a review of the agreements signed between Honduras and China under the Castro administration. His government indicated that it was evaluating the country's relationship with Beijing and the possibility of restoring diplomatic relations with Taiwan. In July 2026, Taiwan's Ministry of Foreign Affairs stated that Honduras' relations with Taiwan were an internal matter for Honduras, after China criticized exchanges between Honduras and Taiwan. At that time, Honduras had not formally restored diplomatic relations with Taiwan.

Asfura has also sought to maintain economic relations with China while reconsidering diplomatic recognition. During the campaign, he stated that Honduras could maintain commercial exchanges with China while restoring diplomatic relations with Taiwan.

==== Ukraine ====
Relations between Honduras and Ukraine strengthened under Asfura. On 20 April 2026, Ukrainian President Volodymyr Zelenskyy held the first leader-level conversation in the history of bilateral relations with Asfura. Zelenskyy said that Ukraine valued Honduras's support for Ukrainian sovereignty and territorial integrity. The two presidents discussed cooperation in agriculture, drone technology, energy decentralization, and digitalization, and agreed that their governments would work on agreements in these areas.

On 19 June, Asfura made the first visit to Ukraine by a Honduran president since the establishment of diplomatic relations between the two countries. During his meeting with Zelenskyy in Kyiv, Asfura expressed support for Ukraine and its defense of democracy and freedom. The two governments discussed economic cooperation, agriculture, digitalization, and defense technologies, including drones. Honduras also expressed interest in Ukrainian agricultural and technological expertise.

==== Israel ====
Asfura has sought to strengthen relations between Honduras and Israel that was previously broken down under Xiomara Castro. On 18 January 2026, shortly before his inauguration, Asfura met Israeli President Isaac Herzog in Jerusalem. Herzog thanked Asfura for his commitment to deepening relations between Israel and Honduras. The two discussed strengthening trade and cooperation in agriculture, technology, and tourism.

Asfura has also identified Israel, alongside the United States and Taiwan, as a country with which Honduras should maintain close relations. During his presidential campaign, he proposed strengthening cooperation with the three countries as part of his foreign-policy orientation.

==== United States ====
Asfura, Trump, Salvadoran President Bukele, Chilean President Kast, and other leaders at the Shield of the Americas summit in Florida, March 2026

Relations with the United States have been a major component of Asfura's foreign policy. During the 2025 presidential election, U.S. President Donald Trump endorsed Asfura, and Asfura campaigned on strengthening relations with the United States. After winning the election, Asfura traveled to Washington, D.C. in January 2026 and met with senior U.S. officials, including Secretary of State Marco Rubio, as well as officials from the Inter-American Development Bank.

On 8 February 2026, Trump met with Asfura at Mar-a-Lago in Palm Beach, Florida. Trump highlighted the security partnership between the United States and Honduras, including cooperation against drug trafficking and criminal organizations. The two leaders also discussed migration and the return of Honduran nationals from the United States.

== Controversies ==
In 2020, Asfura was indicted by the Honduran authorities on charges of embezzling public funds, money laundering, fraud, and abuse of authority. He and co-defendant, Nilvia Ethel Castillo Cruz, were accused of misappropriating more than 28 million lempiras for their personal benefit. In 2021, the judiciary seized nine real estate properties and three businesses belonging to Asfura, Cruz, and associates. Six of these properties (valued at a total 28.5 million lempiras) were ordered to be returned to their owners following a ruling against the government department Unidad Fiscal Especializada Contra Redes de Corrupción (UFERCO) on 25 September 2023, by the Juzgado de Letras de Privación de Dominio de Bienes de Origen Ilícitoin Asfura. UFERCO appealed the charges, but was unsuccessful, and the assets were returned. The case continued until 15 December 2025, when the Supreme Court fully annulled all charges against Asfura and Cruz.

In early October 2021, while the aforementioned legal case was ongoing, Asfura was named in the Pandora Papers.

== Personal life ==
Asfura married Lissette del Cid in 1985 and has three daughters.

Political offices
Preceded by Ricardo Álvarez Arias	Mayor of Tegucigalpa; 2014–2022	Succeeded by Jorge Aldana
Preceded by Xiomara Castro	President of Honduras; 2026–present	Incumbent
Party political offices
Preceded by Juan Orlando Hernández	National Party nominee for President of Honduras; 2021, 2025	Most recent
