= Renato Florentino =

Honduran physician and politician

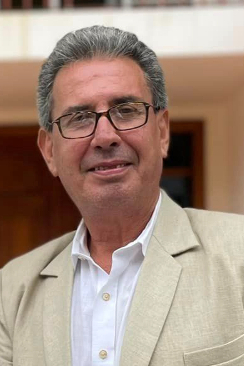

Third Vice President of Honduras
- In office 27 January 2022 – 27 January 2026 Serving with Salvador Nasralla (2022–2024) and Doris Gutiérrez
- President: Xiomara Castro
- Preceded by: María Antonia Rivera
- Succeeded by: Diana Herrera

Personal details
- Born: 1964 (age 61–62)
- Party: Liberty and Refoundation

Renato Florentino Pineda (Note: In this Spanish name, the first or paternal surname is Florentino and the second or maternal family name is Pineda.) (born in 1964) is a Honduran physician and politician who served as the Third Vice President of Honduras between 2022 and 2026.
