= Vice President of Honduras =

Second highest constitutional office in Honduras

Designates to the Presidency of the Republic of Honduras
- Designados a la Presidencia de la República de Honduras
- Coat of arms of Honduras
- Incumbent; María Antonieta Mejía; Carlos Flores Guifarro; Diana Herrera since 27 January 2026
- Style: Mr./Madame Vice President (informal); The Most Excellent and His/Her Excellency (formal)
- Term length: 4 years, non renewable
- Inaugural holder: Marcelino Ponce Martínez, Céleo Arias Moncada, and Arturo Rendón Pineda (1982)
- Formation: 27 January 1982 (current)

The vice presidents of Honduras, officially the Designates to the Presidency (Spanish: Designados a la Presidencia), is the second highest political position in Honduras. According to the current constitution, the president and vice-presidents are elected in the same ticket. From 1957 to 2006 and from 2010 onwards there are positions of first, second, and third vice-president commonly known as the presidential designates (Spanish: designados presidenciales).

Only during the Zelaya administration the vice-presidential position was held by one person, since the Congress reformed the Constitution in 2008 for that the vice-presidential charge would be held again by three persons. The position of vice president commissioner was created by former President Manuel Zelaya after Vice President Elvin Santos resigned in late 2008.

== Functions and duties ==
The only constitutional duty of the vice presidents is to perform the functions of the president in their absence (one of the vice presidents is selected by the president to serve in the role on a temporary basis until the president's return). If the absence or incapacitation is considered to be permanent, then one of the three vice presidents, selected by the National Congress, will fulfill the functions of the president until the end of the term. If all the vice presidents are absent, the president of the National Congress takes over as acting president, and if the president of the National Congress is also absent then the president of the Supreme Court becomes acting president until the end of the term.

Vice presidents are eligible to be impeached by the National Congress for poor performance or misconduct. Vice presidents are also not allowed to remain outside the country for more than 15 days without the permission of the National Congress.

== Requirements and restrictions ==
The requirements to be a vice president are the same as that of the president. A candidate must be Honduran by birth, be over the age of 30, have full civic rights, and may not be an active member of the leadership of any established religion.

Vice presidents may not be elected president while serving in the role, or within six months after the end of their term or resignation. Vice presidents can also not be elected as a deputy of the National Congress while serving in office.

== History ==
The following is a history of officeholders:

=== 1839–1954 ===
Term	President	Vice president	Notes
1839–1841	Francisco Zelaya y Ayes	Francisco Alvarado	
1841–1843	Francisco Ferrera	Coronado Chávez	
1843–1844	Francisco Ferrera	Felipe Jáuregui	
1847	Francisco Ferrera	Coronado Chávez	
1848–1850	Juan Lindo	Felipe Bustillo	
1852–1855	José Trinidad Cabañas	José Santiago Bueso	
1855	José Santiago Bueso	Juan López	
1855	José Santiago Bueso	Francisco de Aguilar	
1856–1860	José Santos Guardiola	José María Lazo Guillén	
1860–1862	José Santos Guardiola	Victoriano Castellanos	
1863	José María Medina	Francisco Inestroza	
1864–1865	José María Medina	Florencio Xatruch	
1865–1866	José María Medina	Juan Francisco López Aguirre	
1870	José María Medina	Crescencio Gómez	
1891–1893	Ponciano Leiva	Rosendo Agüero Ariza	
1895–1899	Policarpo Bonilla	Manuel Bonilla	
1899–1903	Terencio Sierra	José María Reina	
1903	Juan Ángel Arias Boquín	Máximo Betancourt Rosales	
1903–1907	Manuel Bonilla	Miguel R. Dávila	
1908	Manuel Bonilla	Máximo Betancourt Rosales	
1908–1911	Miguel R. Dávila	Dionysius Gutiérrez	
1912–1913	Manuel Bonilla	Francisco Bertrand	
1913–1915	Francisco Bertrand	Nazario Soriano	
1916–1919	Francisco Bertrand	Alberto Membreño Vásquez	
1920–1924	Rafael López Gutiérrez	José María Ochoa	
1924	Rafael López Gutiérrez	Francisco Bueso	
1925–1929	Miguel Paz Barahona	Presentación Quezada	
1929–1933	Vicente Mejía Colindres	Rafael Díaz Chávez	
1933–1949	Tiburcio Carías Andino	Abraham Williams Calderón	
1949–1954	Juan Manuel Gálvez	Julio Lozano Díaz	

=== 1957–1972 (Military Era) ===
Term	President	First presidential designate	Second presidential designate	Third presidential designate	Notes
1957–1963	Ramon Villeda Morales	José Mejía Arellano	Francisco Milla Bermúdez	Juan Miguel Mejía	
1965–1971	Oswaldo López Arellano	Ricardo Zúñiga Agustinus	Horacio Moya Posas	Napoleón Alcerro Oliva	
1971–1972	Ramón Ernesto Cruz Uclés	René Bendaña Meza	Eugenio Matute Canizales	Tiburcio Carías Castillo	

=== Constitutional vice presidents (since 1982) ===
==== Presidential designates (1982–2006) ====
Term	President	First presidential designate	Second presidential designate	Third presidential designate	Notes
1982–1986	Roberto Suazo Cordova	Marcelino Ponce Martínez	Céleo Arias Moncada	Arturo Rendón Pineda	
1986–1990	José Azcona del Hoyo	Alfredo Fortín Inestroza	José Pineda Gómez	Jaime Rosenthal	Rosenthal left office in 1989
1990–1994	Rafael Leonardo Callejas	Jacobo Hernández Cruz	Marco Tulio Cruz	Roberto Martínez Lozano	
1994–1998	Carlos Roberto Reina	Walter López Reyes	Juan de la Cruz Avelar Leiva	Guadalupe Jerezano Mejía	
1998–2002	Carlos Roberto Flores	William Handal Raudales	Gladys Caballero de Arévalo	Hector Vidal Cerrato Hernandez	
2002–2006	Ricardo Maduro	Vicente Williams Agasse	Armida Villela de López Contreras	José Alberto Díaz Lobo	

==== Vice-president and presidential commissioner (2006–2010) ====
Before the 2005 elections, the Honduran Congress reformed the Constitution for that the charge of vice-president may be held by only one person.

Term	President	Vice president	Notes
2006–2009	Manuel Zelaya	Elvin Santos (27 January 2006 – 18 November 2008)	Elvin Santos resigned to pursue the presidency.
2006–2009	Manuel Zelaya	Unoccupied (18 November 2008 – 1 February 2009)	
2006–2009	Manuel Zelaya	Arístides Mejía (1 February 2009 – 28 June 2009)	Arístides Mejía didn't fully occupy the charge; he was a presidential commissioner, not a vice-president, since he was appointed by President Zelaya and not popularly elected; this equates to being a minister without portfolio. He was deposed on 28 June 2009.
2009–2010	Roberto Micheletti	Unoccupied (28 June 2009 – 27 January 2010)	Acting President Roberto Micheletti did not appoint any presidential commissioner (like Manuel Zelaya did with Aristides Mejía) while he was occupying the Honduran presidency.

==== Presidential designates (2010–present) ====
In 2008, before the Honduran primary elections, the three posts of vice-presidents were restored by order of the Supreme Court which deemed their replacement with a single vice-president unconstitutional.

Term	President	First presidential designate	Second presidential designate	Third presidential designate	Notes
2010–2014	Porfirio Lobo Sosa	María Antonieta Guillén Vásquez	Samuel Armando Reyes Rendon	Victor Hugo Barnica	
2014–2018	Juan Orlando Hernández	Ricardo Antonio Alvarez Arias	Ava Rossana Guevara Pinto	Lorena Enriqueta Herrera	
2018–2022	Juan Orlando Hernández	Ricardo Antonio Alvarez Arias	Olga Margarita Alvarado Rodríguez	María Antonia Rivera Rosales	
2022–2026	Xiomara Castro	Salvador Nasralla	Doris Gutiérrez	Renato Florentino	Nasralla left office in 2024
2026–2030	Nasry Asfura	María Antonieta Mejía	Carlos Flores Guifarro	Diana Herrera	
