= Xiomara Castro =

President of Honduras from 2022 to 2026

Her Excellency Xiomara Castro
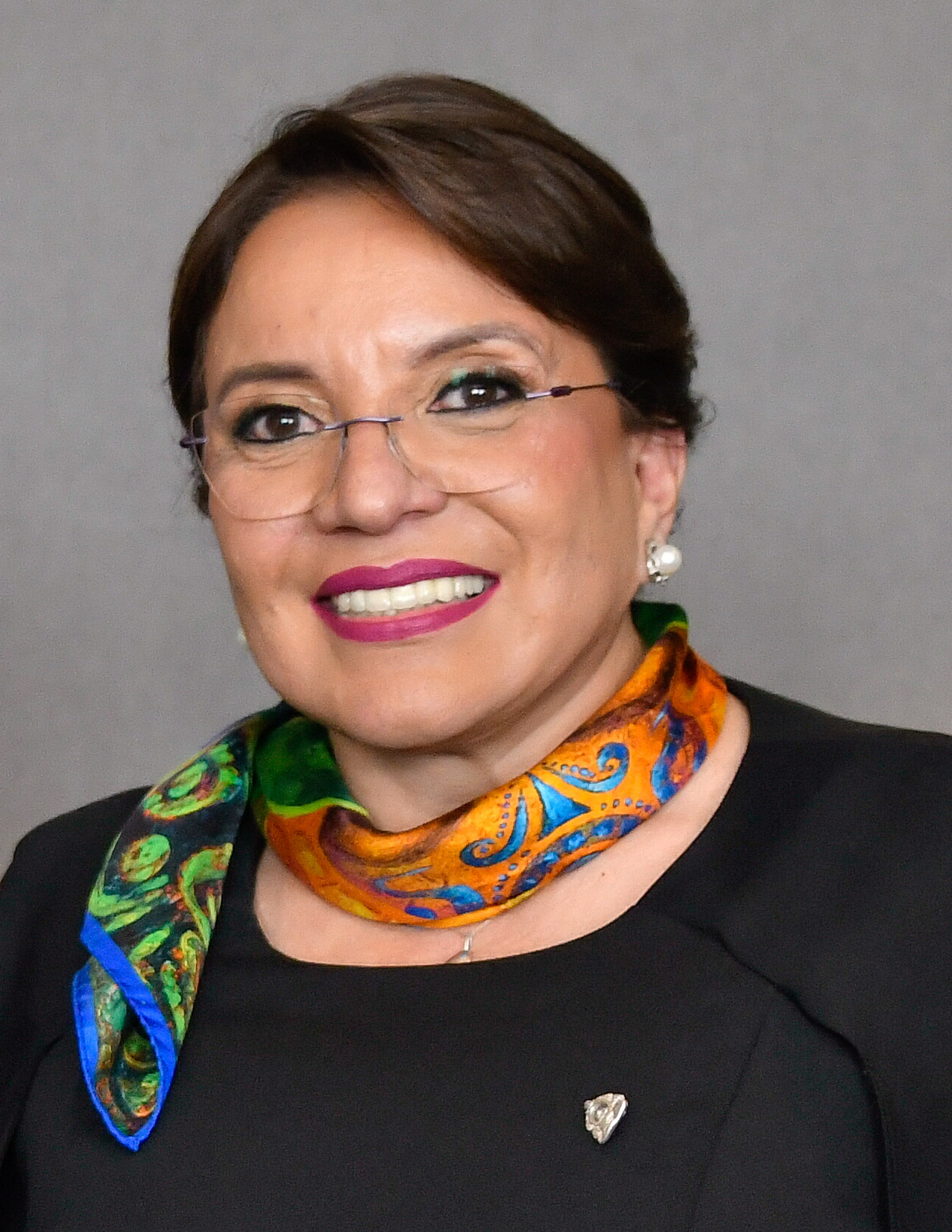
- Castro in 2024

Member of the Central American Parliament
- Incumbent
- Assumed office 27 January 2026
- Constituency: Honduras

39th President of Honduras
- In office 27 January 2022 – 27 January 2026
- Vice President: Salvador Nasralla (until 2024); Doris Gutiérrez; Renato Florentino
- Preceded by: Juan Orlando Hernández
- Succeeded by: Nasry Asfura

Minister of National Defense
- In office 27 May 2025 – 18 December 2025
- President: Herself
- Preceded by: Rixi Moncada
- Succeeded by: Roosevelt Hernández Aguilar

First Lady of Honduras
- In role 27 January 2006 – 28 June 2009
- President: Manuel Zelaya
- Preceded by: Aguas Ocaña
- Succeeded by: Siomara Girón

13th President pro tempore of the Community of Latin American and Caribbean States
- In office 4 March 2024 – 9 April 2025
- Preceded by: Ralph Gonsalves
- Succeeded by: Gustavo Petro

Personal details
- Born: Iris Xiomara Castro Sarmiento; 30 September 1959 (age 67) Santa Bárbara, Honduras
- Party: Liberty and Refoundation (2011–present)
- Other political affiliations: Liberal Party (until 2011)
- Spouse: Manuel Zelaya (m. 1976)
- Children: 4, including Xiomara

Iris Xiomara Castro Sarmiento (Spanish pronunciation: [sjoˈmaɾa ˈkastɾo]; born 30 September 1959), also known by her married name as Xiomara Castro de Zelaya, is a Honduran politician, and diplomat who was president of Honduras from 2022 to 2026. She was the country's first female president, and served as first lady during the presidency of her husband Manuel Zelaya.

Castro grew up in Tegucigalpa. She married in 1976 and became active in the women's section of the Liberal Party of Honduras. She became the country's first lady in 2006 following her husband's victory in the 2005 Honduran presidential election. Castro became involved in the National Popular Resistance Front after her husband's refusal to comply with a Supreme Court order led to the 2009 Honduran coup d'état, forcing him into exile.

She was nominated as the presidential candidate of the left-wing Liberty and Refoundation (LIBRE) party at the 2013 Honduran general election, finishing runner-up to National Party of Honduras candidate Juan Orlando Hernández and outpolling Liberal candidate Mauricio Villeda. At the 2017 Honduran general election, she was Salvador Nasralla's running mate, with the ticket narrowly losing to Hernández amidst allegations of irregularities. Castro was ultimately elected to the presidency in the 2021 Honduran general election, defeating National candidate Nasry Asfura with Nasralla as her running mate. She was the first president from outside the country's two-party system since democracy had been restored in 1982. In 2023, she was ranked 94 on Forbes's list of the world's 100 most powerful women.

== Early life ==
Xiomara Castro was born on 30 September 1959 in Santa Bárbara, Honduras. The second of five children to Irene de Jesús Castro Reyes and Olga Doris Sarmiento Montoya, Castro attended primary and secondary school in Tegucigalpa at the San José del Carmen Institute and the María Auxiliadora Institute. In January 1976, Castro married Manuel Zelaya. Immediately after the wedding, they made their home in Catacamas, Olancho Department.

Castro played an active part in the Association of Spouses of Members of the Rotary Club of Catacamas, as well as the activities developed within the group to take care of children in need in the Olancho department. She took part in the creation of the Centro de Cuidado Diurno para Niños en Catacamas (Children's Daily Care Center in Catacamas), with the aim of offering assistance to single-parent families led by women, including through the creation of projects of basic cleaning, sowing of vegetables, and floriculture as important projects of job development.

== Political career ==
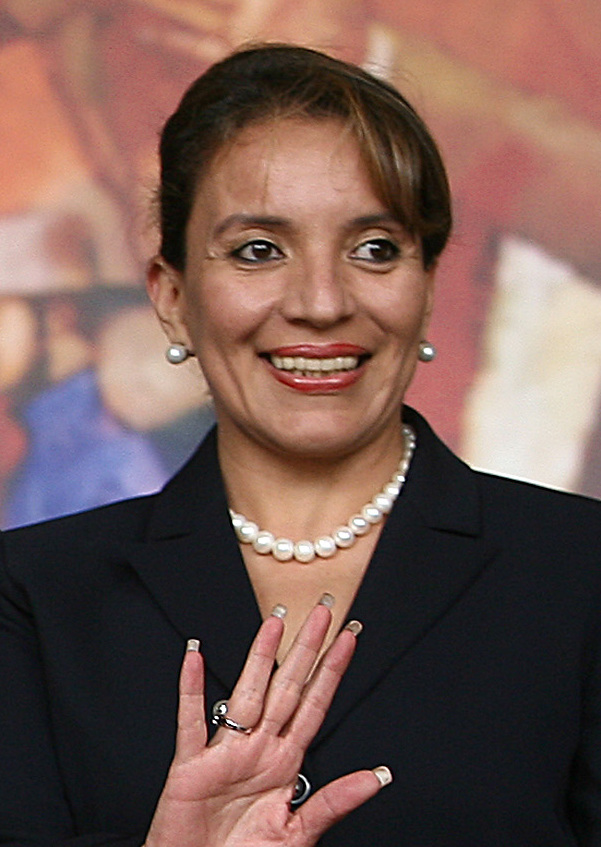
Castro in August 2007

In Catacamas, Castro organized the women's branch of the Liberal Party of Honduras and campaigned in support of her husband in the internal elections of February 2005, while she was in charge of sub-political coordination of Catacamas. As First Lady of Honduras, she was in charge of social development programs, and she worked with the United Nations in coalition with other first ladies to address issues faced by women with HIV.

Following the removal of her husband in the 2009 Honduran coup d'état, she led the movement resisting the coup, repeatedly joining thousands of Hondurans in the streets calling for Zelaya's return. This movement became known as the National Popular Resistance Front (FNRP) and formed the basis for the political party Libre.

The Taiwanese embassy only offered Castro's pregnant daughter political protection on humanitarian grounds. Lai Chien-Chung, the Taiwanese ambassador to Honduras, stating the refusal was to spread the risk and disputed the opposition's narrative of indifference. She said her office reached out to Castro and sheltered her husband and two daughters. Taiwanese KMT opposition member Tsai Cheng-yuan claims that Taipei staff evicted the family and called in the military police to arrest them. Castro joined her husband in the Brazilian embassy, where he had taken refuge before reaching a negotiation with the de facto regime.

=== Presidential campaigns ===
==== 2013 ====
On 1 July 2012, Castro officially launched her presidential campaign at an event in the department of Santa Barbara. She then won her party's primary on 18 November 2012, and on 16 June 2013, she was officially chosen to represent Libre in the 2013 presidential election. She expressed opposition to neoliberalism and the militarization of society, and she campaigned for a constituent assembly to write a new constitution

Leading up to the election, she was first in the polls among all eight candidates during the months of March through October. However, in the final poll before the election, she fell to second place, behind the President of the National Congress, Juan Orlando Hernández of the National Party of Honduras. Castro and Hernández were widely seen as the two leading candidates going into the election. She came in second behind Hernández with 896,498 votes (28.78%) to Hernández's 1,149,302 (36.89%). This was the first time the Libre party outperformed either the National or the Liberal Party, as Libre won the second most seats in Congress.

==== 2017 ====
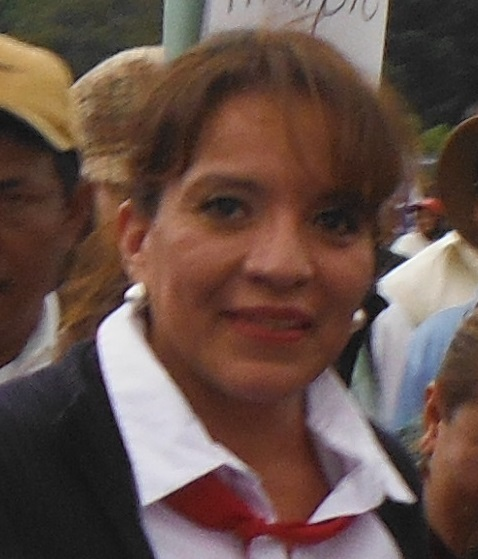
Castro in 2013

For the 2017 presidential election, Castro again sought to be Libre's nominee. She easily won the primary, but when Libre formed an alliance with the Innovation and Unity Party, she agreed to step aside and let Salvador Nasralla lead the alliance's presidential ticket.

The Alliance won the election in the pre-election polls, and led in the preliminary results. However, a general blackout interrupted the publication of the count for 36 hours; when it was restarted, the trend was reversed and President Juan Orlando Hernández was re-elected, leading to accusations of fraud. The ensuing demonstrations were suppressed by the government, leaving 23 people dead, hundreds injured and more than 1,350 detained.

==== 2021 ====
Castro was chosen as the 2021 presidential candidate for Libre and represented her political party in the 2021 Honduran general election. Salvador Nasralla, a presidential candidate for the Savior Party, later dropped out and became Castro's running mate. Polls showed a tight race between Castro and her right-wing opponent Nasry Asfura, of the incumbent National Party, a two-term mayor plagued by allegations of corruption. During her presidential campaign, she suggested the diplomatic recognition of the People's Republic of China in Beijing over the Republic of China on Taiwan (see One-China policy), the establishment of an anti-corruption commission backed by the United Nations similar to the one active in Guatemala and an update to the Honduran Constitution. Castro has proposed a constituent assembly to rewrite the Constitution of Honduras. She has also suggested easing the country's complete prohibition of abortion, under limited circumstances, and allow the use and distribution of emergency contraception.

Following the release of the preliminary results of the election on 29 November, Castro declared victory, and was described by international media as the apparent victor of the election, pending full results. The next day, Asfura's party conceded defeat. He then met with Castro and congratulated her. Castro became Honduras' first female president on 27 January 2022.

=== 2022 congressional leadership dispute ===
Before the 2021 election, Castro had promised Salvador Nasralla that his Savior Party would hold the leadership of the National Congress should they win the election. This promise was one of the conditions that persuaded Nasralla to end his presidential campaign and join Castro's. However, on 21 January 2022, 20 deputies from Libre refused to follow suit. They voted for Libre deputy Jorge Cálix to be the congressional president. The rest of the Libre deputies and allied parties voted for Luis Redondo of the Savior Party per the initial agreement. A fight then broke out on the floor of Congress, and Castro refused to recognise Cálix's election. She subsequently denounced the 20 deputies (two of whom later retracted their support for Cálix) as "traitors" and expelled 18 from Libre. The following evening Castro held a vigil with Libre supporters outside the Congress; she stated that the purpose of the event was "...to prevent the kidnapping of the National Congress and to reject the bipartisanship led by the dictator Juan Orlando Hernández with the direct complicity of a few traitorous deputies, elected by the people under our banner". The dispute ended when Calíx and the expelled Libre deputies agreed to support Redondo. Castro subsequently had their party membership restored.

== Presidency (2022–2026) ==
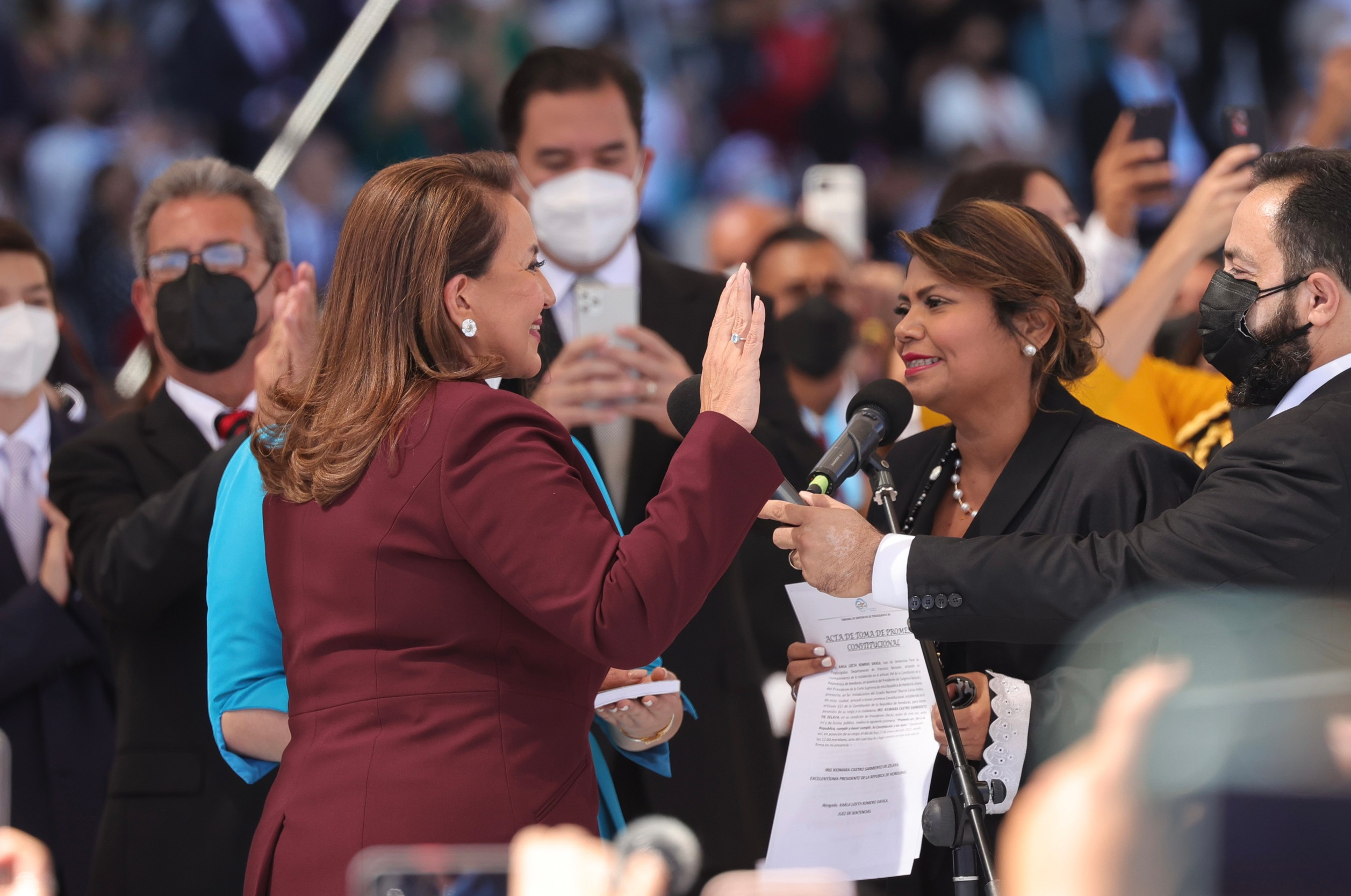
Castro in her inauguration, January 2022

Castro was inaugurated as president on 27 January 2022. She was sworn in at the Tegucigalpa National Soccer Stadium, later renamed Estadio Nacional Chelato Uclés in 2022, with thousands of individuals present. Among the attendees were King of Spain Felipe VI, Vice President of Taiwan Lai Ching-te, U.S. Vice President Kamala Harris, Vice President of Argentina Cristina Fernández de Kirchner, Vice President of Cuba Salvador Valdés Mesa and President of Costa Rica Carlos Alvarado Quesada.

Castro is the first female President of Honduras and the first to not be a member of the National or Liberal parties since the restoration of democracy in 1982. During her inaugural address, Castro promised to combat corruption and inequality which she said was 'rampant' during the rule of the previous National government.

Castro extradited her predecessor Juan Orlando Hernández to the United States for his links to drug trafficking, rather than hand him over to the Honduran justice system; she cited Honduras state corruption as her motivation. Her government asked for the help of the United Nations in setting up an international commission to fight corruption.

The Supreme Court, whose members were appointed by previous governments, opposes some of her reform plans.

=== Economic policy ===
In her inaugural speech, Castro vowed to re-found a democratic socialist state, stating she had a duty to restore an economic system based upon transparency, efficiency of production, social justice in the distribution of wealth and in national income, and that her vision of her world puts the human being before the rules of the market.

In February 2022, she intervened in a dispute with a businessman over the ownership of a large piece of land south of the capital. The businessman, who owned the land under Honduras law, intended to evict indigenous people to build homes for 10,000 Hondurans; she intervened to stop the eviction, citing indigenous wellbeing over rule of law.

She banned open-pit mining in March 2022 due to the extensive damage to the environment. The government also promised to intervene "immediately" to conserve areas of "high environmental value" for the benefit of the population.

In May 2022, Castro began a measure passed by Congress to abolish Honduras' special economic zones, which the previous National government implemented.

In May 2023, the government introduced a law reforming the tax system, termed Ley de Justicia Tributaria (LJT). The government stated the law is designed to eliminate tax loopholes and privileges for certain economic sectors. The bill was met with protests by melon farmers and shrimpers inside the country, because it entails a revocation of tax rebates for these industries.

At her state visit to the People's Republic of China in Shanghai in June 2023, Castro applied for Honduran membership in the New Development Bank, also called BRICS Development Bank, as this would boost the economic development and raise living standards in her country.

During her term in office, Castro has achieved some economic growth and brought inflation under control. Her greatest successes have been a 13.5-point reduction in poverty.

==== Energy ====
In a bid to combat poverty, Castro announced during her inauguration that the poorest families in Honduras, those that consume under 150kWh per month of electricity, will no longer pay electricity bills, and that the additional cost of this policy will be paid for by the biggest consumers assuming an extra charge on their bills. In addition, Castro also announced that her government would send a decree to the National Congress of Honduras to achieve a fuel subsidy, and vowed no more concessions in the exploitation of rivers, hydrographic basins and national parks.

==== Fiscal policy ====
In her inaugural address, Castro announced to the nation that the largest base of the budget she will present to parliament is dedicated to salaries and wages. In-addition, Castro stated that she had ordered her Minister of Finance and the Central Bank to take action to reduce interest rates for production.

==== Security policy ====
On the 25th of November on 2022, a state of emergency was declared to deal with crime.

Initially instituted for forty-five days in two municipalities, Tegucigalpa and San Pedro Sula, the state of exception has been renewed and extended to more than half of the country's cities. The government strengthened police resources, built several high-security prisons, authorized the deployment of security forces in the streets, and authorized the deployment of military forces in the streets to support the police.

The homicide rate has fallen from 38 per 100,000 inhabitants in 2022 to 31 in 2023, a drop of 17%. However, according to some specialists, the reduction in crime is not directly linked to the state of emergency. The government's security policy is also hampered by blockages in Parliament, where Xiomara Castro's party does not hold a majority.

In 2025, the homicide rate is the lowest in thirty years, according to data from the independent organization ACLED (Armed Conflict Location and Event Data), and has been reduced by more than half in large cities such as San Pedro Sula and the capital Tegucigalpa.

=== Foreign policy ===
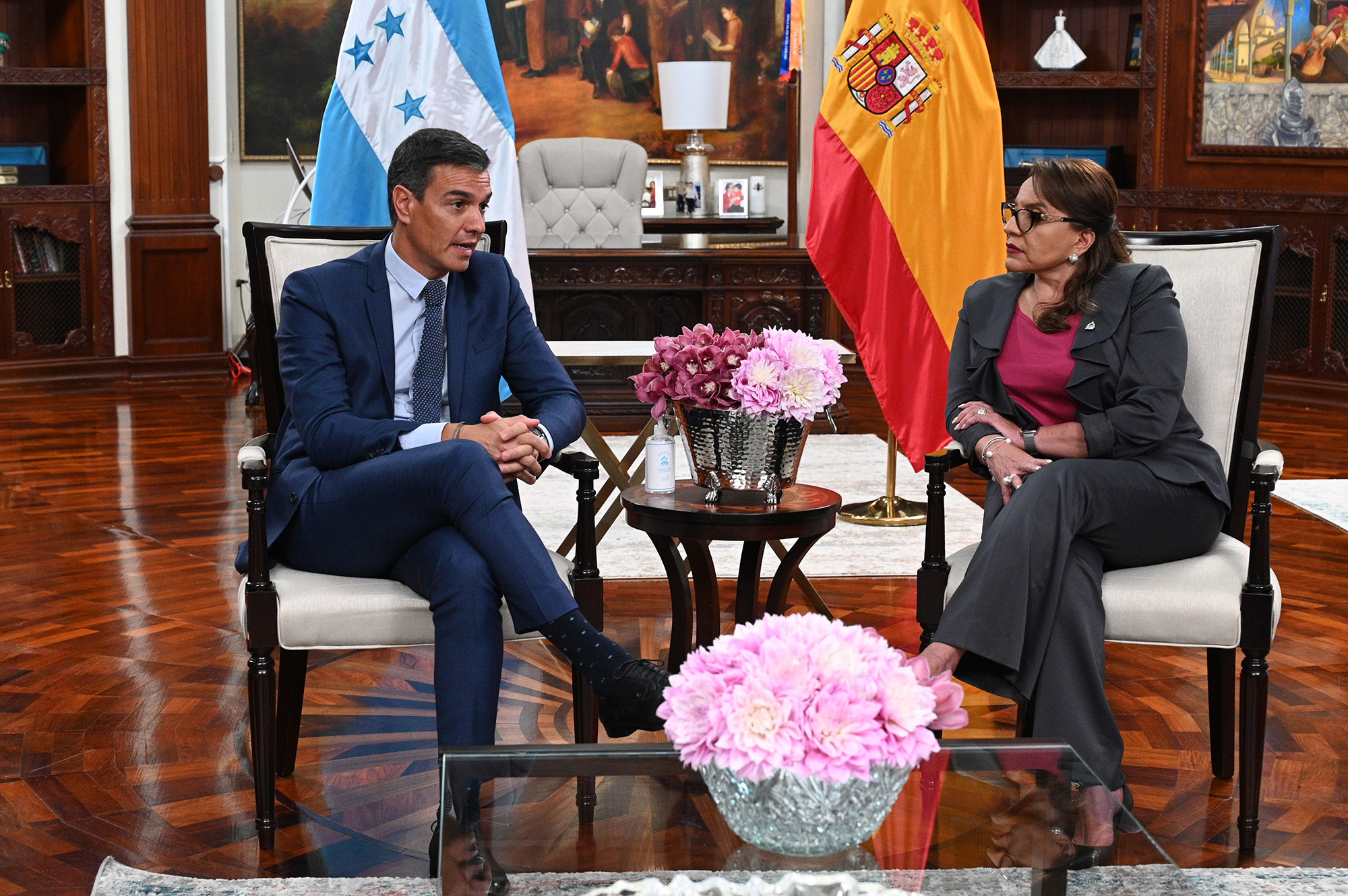
Castro with Spanish Prime Minister Pedro Sánchez in Tegucigalpa in August 2022

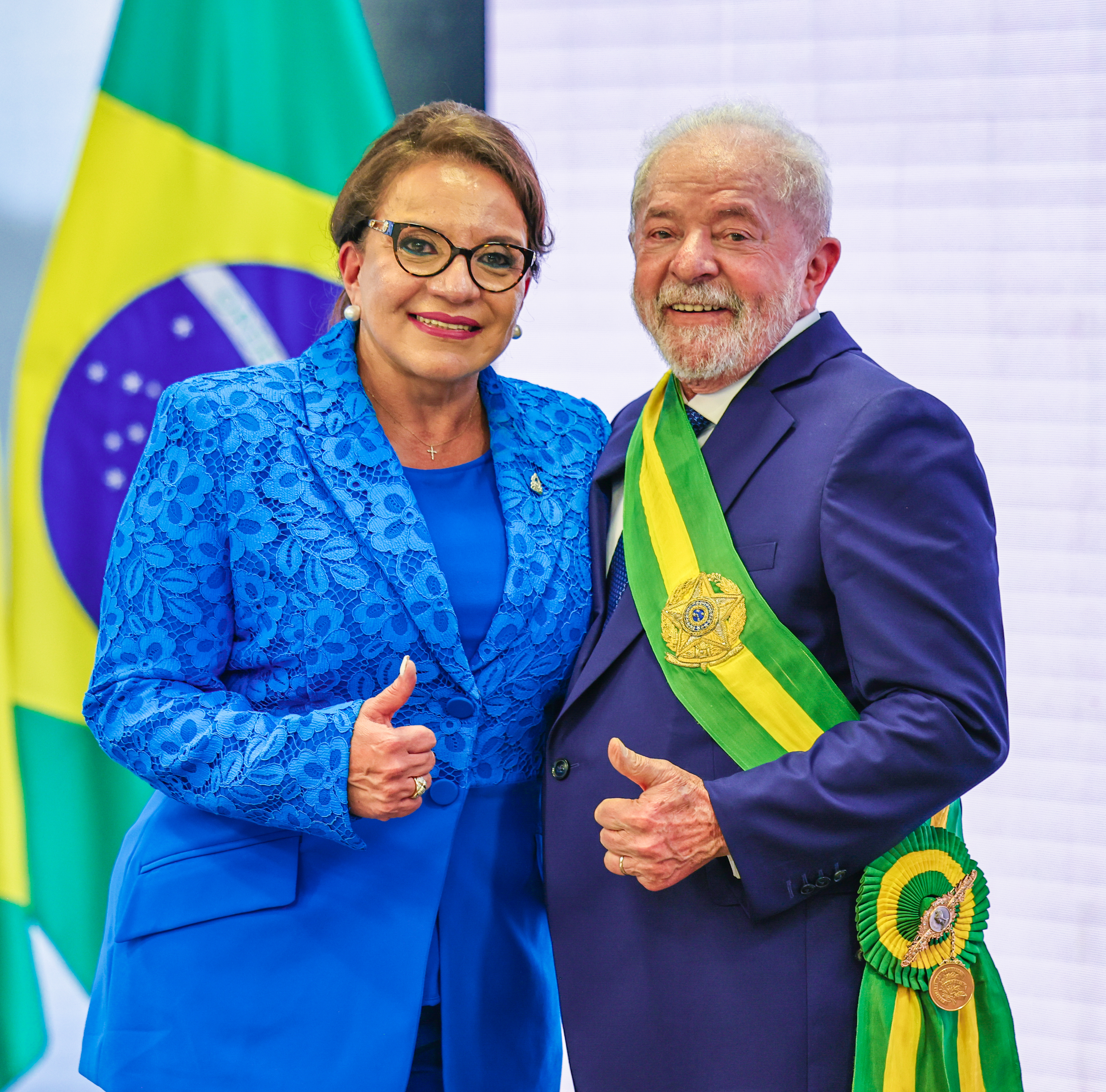
Castro with Brazilian President Luiz Inácio Lula da Silva in January 2023

==== Sahrawi Arab Democratic Republic ====
In February 2022, Deputy Foreign Minister Gerardo Torres Zelaya held a meeting with Sahrawi President Brahim Ghali, which concluded with an announcement that diplomatic relations between the peoples and governments of Honduras and the SADR had been restored and would be deepened.

==== Taiwan and People's Republic of China ====
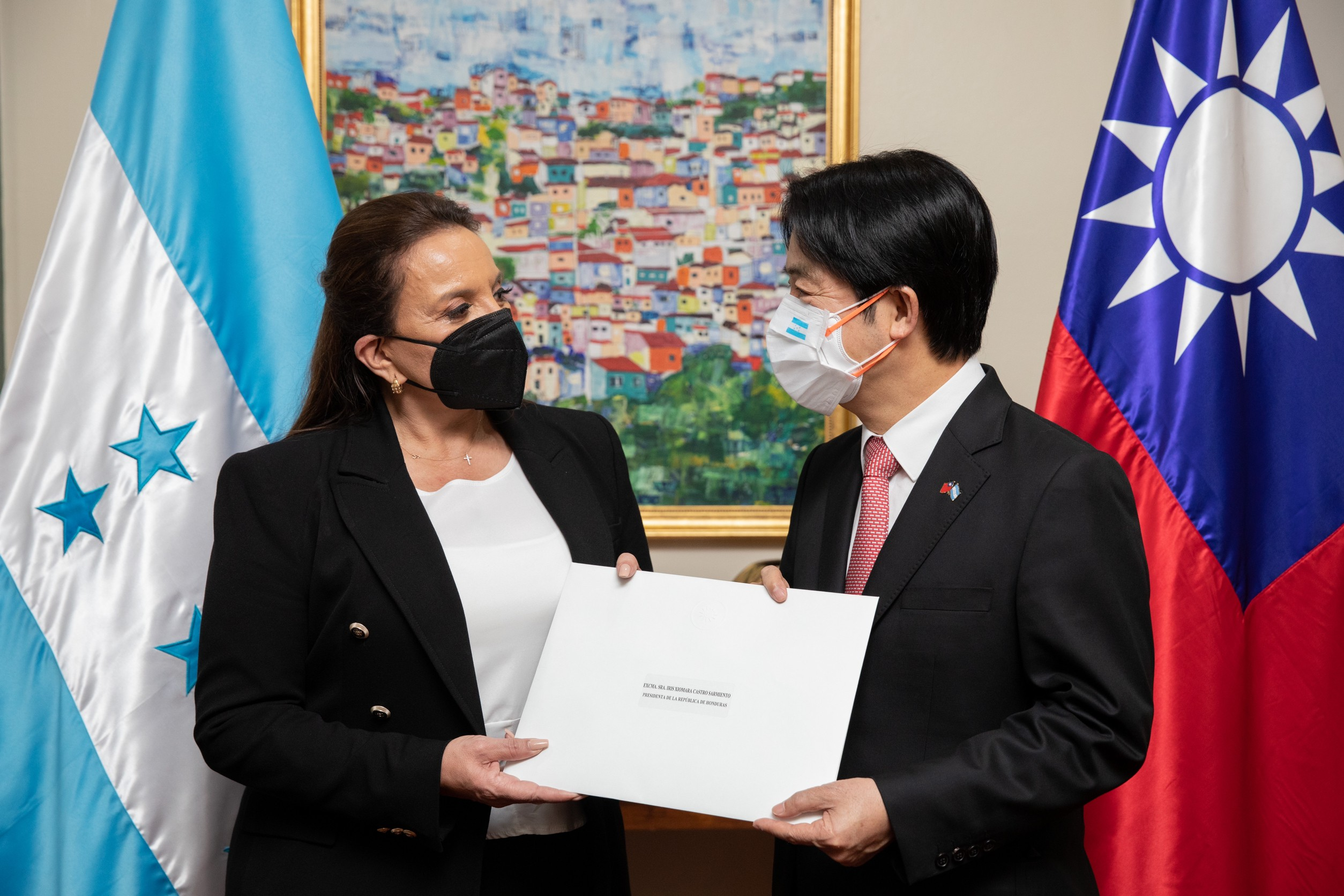
Castro and the Taiwanese vice-president Lai Ching-te in 2022

During her campaign, Castro promised to change Honduras' allegiance from the Republic of China (Taiwan) to the People's Republic of China if elected. Taiwanese Vice President Lai Ching-te attended Castro's inauguration. On 14 March 2023, Castro instructed her foreign minister to move to cut ties with Taiwan in order to establish formal relations with the People's Republic of China as the sole Chinese state. At the end of March, Honduras and the PRC formally established diplomatic ties and appointed ambassadors to their respective capitals.

Retired Taiwanese Kuomintang opposition member Tsai Cheng-yuan posted on social media that this move was a result of Taiwan refusing to shelter Castro during the 2009 coup. Castro for her part cited U.S. interventionism and pressure, especially in regards to Taiwan in Central America, as motives to open diplomatic relations with the People's Republic of China.

==== Venezuela ====
Shortly following Castro's inauguration, an event attended by representatives of the Nicolás Maduro government, the Venezuelan embassy in Tegucigalpa was vacated by representatives of Juan Guaidó, who had been recognised as the President of Venezuela by outgoing President Juan Orlando Hernández since the Venezuelan presidential crisis. As a result, the embassy was recovered by the Venezuelan delegation sent by the Maduro government. Former President and First Gentleman Manuel Zelaya responded to the news by sending a tweet welcoming Maduro, Latin American unity and the Bolivarian Revolution. Soon after, the Foreign Minister of Venezuela, Félix Plasencia, and newly appointed Foreign Minister of Honduras Enrique Reina announced the restoration of diplomatic relations between the two nations for the first time since 2009, when they were severed shortly after the coup. The restoration of diplomatic relations was followed by Honduran accreditation of the Venezuelan ambassador Margaud Godoy by Foreign Minister Reina, who said that if the United States had any uncertainty about Honduras' position, reestablishment of relations with Venezuela "for Honduras is a matter of sovereign foreign policy".

In January 2026, Castro condemned the United States' military intervention in Venezuela, which resulted in the capture of Nicolás Maduro.

==== Israeli–Palestinian conflict ====
Castro announced the recall of the Honduran ambassador from Israel on 4 November 2023, shortly after the country's ministry of foreign affairs stated that "Honduras energetically condemns the genocide and serious violations of international humanitarian law that the civilian Palestinian population is suffering in the Gaza Strip".

==== Speeches before the UN ====
The United Nations General Assemblies (UN) are held in New York every September.

===== 77th General Assembly (2022) =====
In her first speech before the UN, the president of Honduras, Xiomara Castro, demanded that Honduras's sovereignty and independence be respected by developed countries: "do not continue trying to destabilize Honduras, and dictate your measures or choose with whom we should relate", she said. She also held them responsible for environmental deterioration and for their participation in wars and financial crises: "This arbitrary world order, in which there are third- and fourth-rate countries, is unacceptable to us". In that context, she assured that her government would defend the environment. Castro blamed the United States for supporting a "narco-dictatorship" in the Central American country during the previous twelve years, in reference to the 12 years during which the right-wing National Party of Honduras held political power before the socialist Liberty and Refoundation Party, to which Castro belongs, came to office. The president referred to her predecessor, Juan Orlando Hernández, who at the time was facing trial for complicity in drug trafficking:

In Honduras we cannot continue sustaining the hypocrisy of a system that judges for crimes linked to drug trafficking the person whom, nevertheless, they backed and supported for more than a decade in the commission of crimes, two electoral frauds, and crimes against the homeland against millions of Hondurans.

Finally, she announced that she would establish relations with China and advocated for the regimes of Cuba and Venezuela:

We proclaim the return to the self-determination of peoples, rejecting the infamous and brutal blockade against the people of our sister Republic of Cuba. The aggression against the Bolivarian Republic of Venezuela must end.

===== 78th General Assembly (2023) =====
For the second time, President Castro defended socialist regimes in Latin America:

We condemn the long blockade against Cuba and against Venezuela; likewise, we demand Cuba's removal from the list of countries classified as terrorists, because it is a manipulated, false and arbitrary measure... Unfair measures and sanctions against Nicaragua must also be removed, because they are barriers preventing us from normalizing our relations with our sister country.

Without mentioning Russia, she blamed global economic interests in Ukraine, in addition to recalling her opening of relations with China. She also referred to the situation in her country, accusing the political opposition and civil-society organizations of conspiring against her government, and specifically against the election of an attorney general. The accusation fell especially on the Citizen Opposition Bloc (BOC), an ephemeral coalition that sought to influence that election and which was made up of three opposition political parties: the major National Party and Liberal Party, and the Salvador of Honduras Party, to which Castro's main political ally and vice president, Salvador Nasralla, belonged. As achievements of her government, Castro said she had achieved a "reduction in extortion" and in homicides, pointing to the implementation of a state of exception. She also said that she had ordered "the greatest increase in the budget of the social sectors" and recalled the repeal of the ZEDEs (Zones for Employment and Economic Development) that Congress approved: "We repealed the ZEDE Law that split Honduran territory into 17 pieces to hand it over to 25 economic groups". Finally, she referred to the process of installing an International Commission against Corruption and Impunity in Honduras (CICIH):

I have delivered to the Secretary-General of the United Nations the official proposal of the agreement for the establishment of the CICIH, impartial, autonomous and independent. With the capacity to investigate and prosecute cases of high-impact corruption networks and financial crimes.

===== 79th General Assembly (2024) =====
President Xiomara Castro began her speech by saying: "Today I am threatened by the same forces of capital that 15 years ago carried out a coup d'état against President Manuel Zelaya", accusing "the ten most powerful families in Honduras" of plotting against her. According to her speech, the destabilization attempts arose in response to her attempt to promote "structural changes to the economic model", specifically a new tax law that would no longer "perpetuate inequality". Castro again alleged interference in her country, maintaining what she had said days earlier when, under the same accusations, she decided to cancel the extradition treaty between her country and the United States (see: Xiomara Castro administration: foreign policy):

Our sovereignty is the fundamental basis and an undeclinable principle of international relations, but in Honduras colonial practices, interference, and economic, media and political domination continue to be imposed.

Castro said she had achieved in Honduras a "historic decrease of 15 points in homicides, the greatest reduction in the last 20 years". She repudiated the murder of environmentalist Juan López and said she had ordered that "the full capacity of the security forces" be used to capture those responsible. She also mentioned the delivery of a second draft agreement for the establishment of the CICIH and the by-then-defunct ZEDEs, declared unconstitutional by the Supreme Court after the National Congress did not ratify their repeal:

The international ZEDE project that sold our territory piece by piece as spoils for international capital, approved by stateless actors in the previous narco-regime, has been definitively cancelled by my government of democratic socialism.

Finally, she again advocated for Nicaragua and Venezuela, and against the United States embargo against Cuba. She condemned the genocide against Palestine and the recent Israeli attacks in Lebanon, hoping that it would not become a new Gaza Strip.

== See also ==
- List of current heads of state and government
- List of heads of the executive by approval rating
- List of presidents of Honduras

Honorary titles
Preceded by Aguas Ocaña	First Lady of Honduras; 2006–2009	Succeeded by Siomara Girón
Party political offices
New political party	Libre nominee for President of Honduras; 2013	Succeeded by Salvador Nasralla
Preceded by Juan Alberto Barahona	Libre nominee for First Vice President of Honduras; 2017	Succeeded by Salvador Nasralla
Preceded by Salvador Nasralla	Libre nominee for President of Honduras; 2021	Succeeded by Rixi Moncada
Political offices
Preceded by Juan Orlando Hernández	President of Honduras; 2022–2026	Succeeded by Nasry Asfura
