= Crime in Honduras =

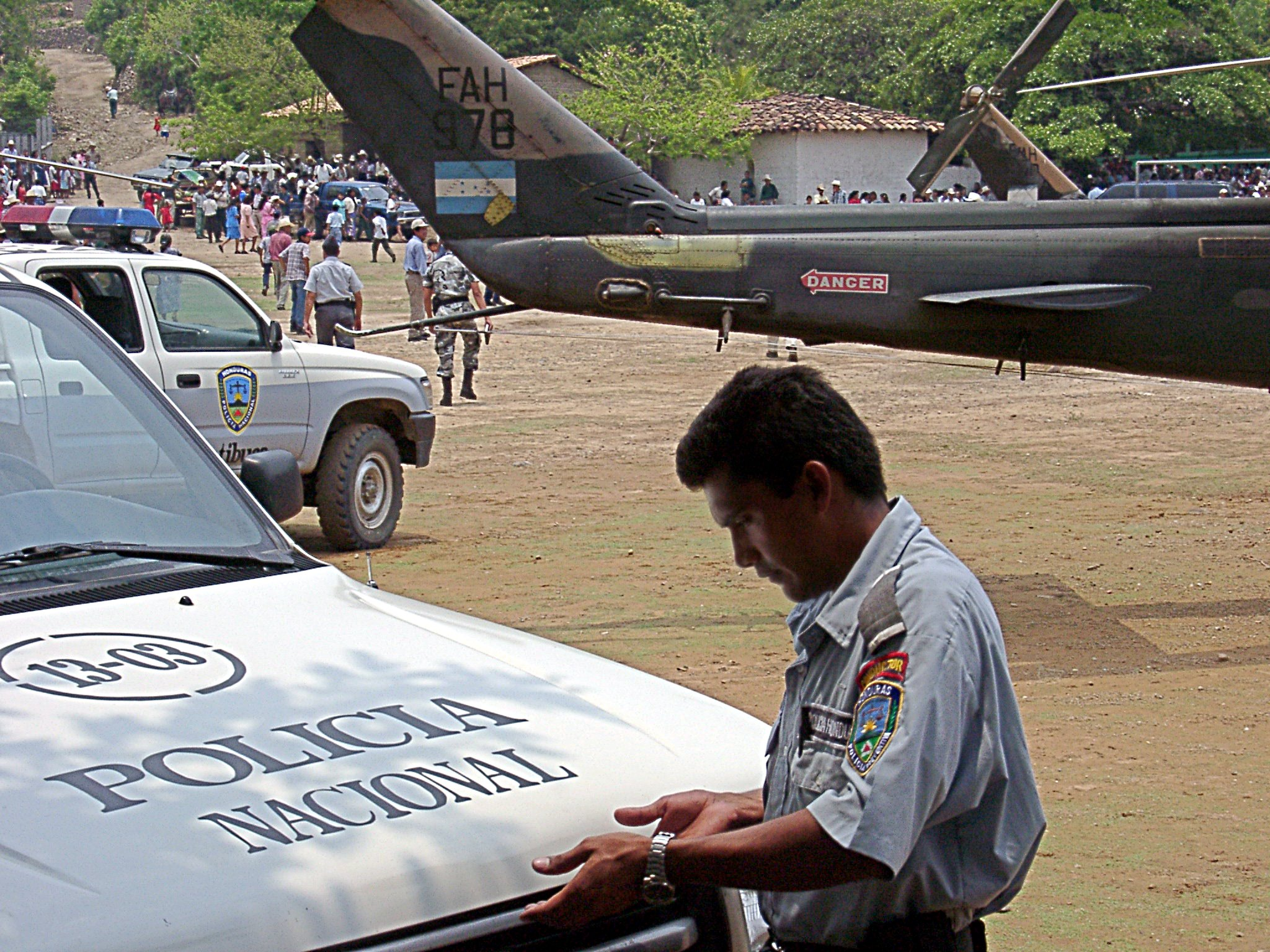
Police in San Francisco, Lempira

Crime in Honduras has become a growing matter of concern in recent years. Honduras has experienced alarmingly high levels of violence and criminal activity, with homicide rates reaching a peak in 2012, averaging 20 homicides per day. Corruption, extortion, coercion, and drug smuggling also run rampant, preventing the country from building trustworthy authorities like police, and severely limiting economic, social, or political progress. This has prompted international organizations and governments to offer assistance in combating crime in Honduras.

== Crime by type ==
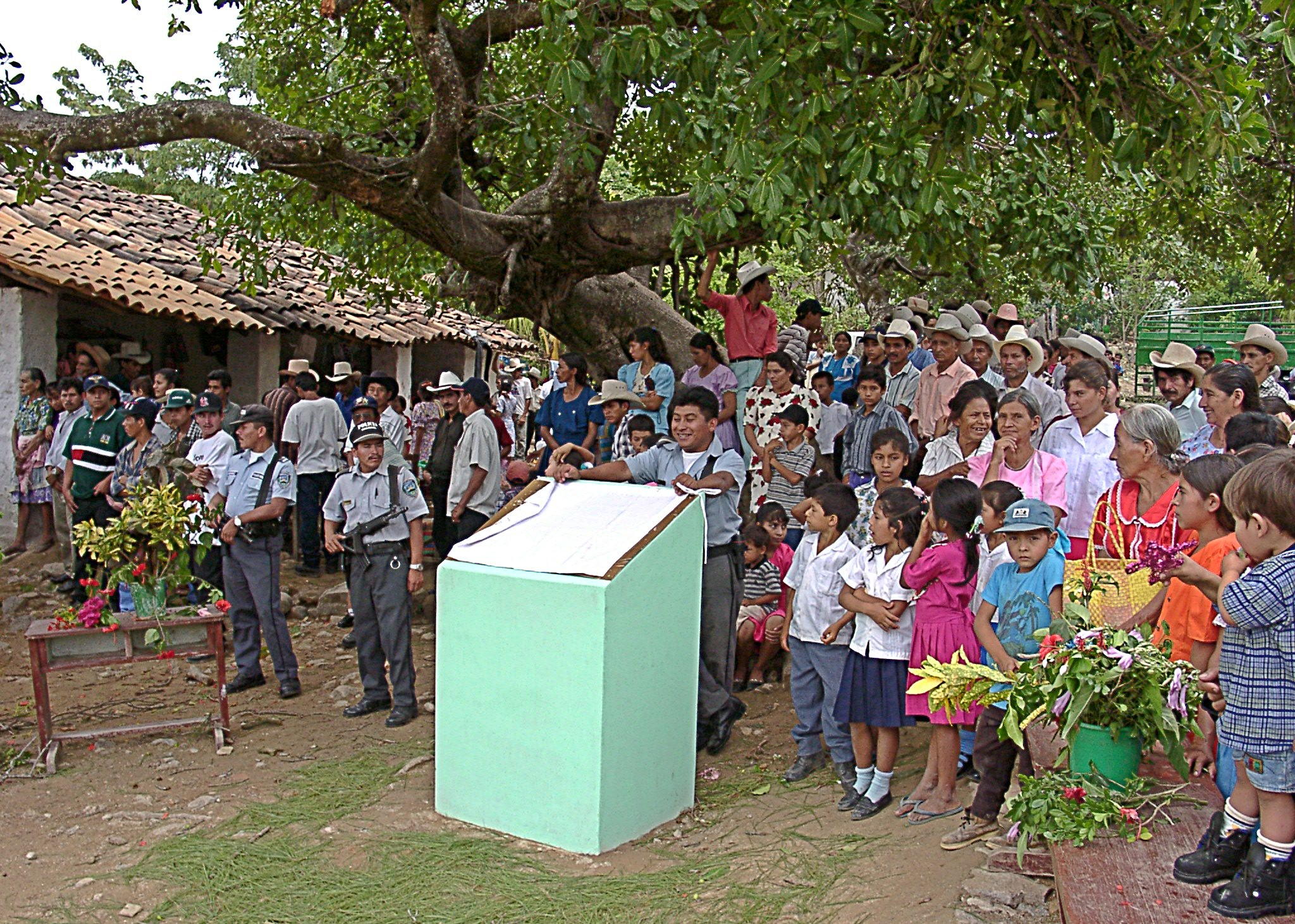
Honduran Police in a rural area

=== Murder ===
High murder rates have long plagued Honduras, which has been routinely classified as one of the most dangerous countries in the region. Latin America as a whole is home to 8 percent of the world's population, yet it accounts for almost 37% of the world’s homicides. When it comes to the world’s most violent urban areas, Central America consistently places numerous cities in the top ten. The domestic homicide rate hit its highest point in 2012, which recorded 7172 homicides, marking the highest murder rate in any country during peacetime. There was a 6.2% increase in homicides compared to the previous year, and 83.4% of these homicides were committed with firearms. Honduras had a homicide rate eighteen times higher than the United States at this point in time. Many perpetrators of these crimes are young men between 15 and 34 years who are typically members of gangs like the Mara Salvatrucha (MS-13) or Barrio 18.

Though the homicide rate fell from prior highs to a rate of 36 per 100,000 in 2022, this still puts Honduras among the world’s most violent countries. The decrease in murder rate has been attributed to multiple different factors, including agreements between criminal groups and the Honduran government; economic aid from the United States Agency for International Development, which funds crime-prevention programs; and the Mano Dura Laws, which were part of a no-tolerance crackdown on crime. More recently, Honduras imposed a state of emergency in December 2022 that enacted a police crackdown on gangs throughout major cities, following the success of a similar program in its neighboring country El Salvador.

The majority of murders in Honduras often go unpunished, and if prosecutions occur at all, they typically involve only low-level gang members. In recent years, only 4% of homicides have ended in a conviction. While this can be partially attributed to systemic corruption within Honduran police and military forces, it is also the product of extensive extortion efforts by organized crime bodies targeting the general population. Anonymous surveys conducted in 2022 suggested that extortionists had targeted over 200,000 Honduran households, a tactic used to threaten witnesses against cooperation with police. As a result, an estimated 99% of crimes go unreported. President Xiomara Castro has recognized the impact of gang extortion on hindering prosecutions, and has made it a centerpiece of her crackdown on organized crime. The fear and insecurity created by violence has also been an obstacle for organizations focused on crime prevention because there is barely any active or social participation to support these organizations.

==== Victims of violence ====
In addition to its very high overall murder rate, Honduras struggles as well with specifically targeted attacks against youths, women, and public figures—including politicians, journalists, activists, and judiciary workers.In 2021, the United Nations declared that violence against women was “the other pandemic” in Honduras, which has a femicide rate of 6.62 per 100,000—the highest in Latin America. The UN noted that 278 Honduran women were killed in 2020, and the National Autonomous University of Honduras along with the National Observatory of Violence reported that a woman was murdered every 27 hours in 2021.

In December 2009 the head of Honduras' anti-drug smuggling operations, Gen Julian Aristides Gonzalez, was assassinated in Tegucigalpa. In 2010, a similar assassination attempt was made on Óscar Álvarez, then the minister of security. The Honduran Department of National Directorate of Criminal Investigation concluded that Mexican drug trafficking organizations were behind both efforts. Journalist David Meza was assassinated in March 2010; he investigated drug trafficking within Honduras and, according to the El Tiempo newspaper, received death threats in 2010. Another reporter, Nahúm Elí Palacios Arteaga, was also assassinated in March 2010.

Honduran gangs and organized crime members, as well as some corrupt state agents continue to threaten journalists reporting on their actions, press freedom groups report. According to the Honduran College of Journalists, from 2001 to 2020, at least 86 journalists have been killed in the country. Ninety-two percent of these killings remain unpunished today.

Another issue that Honduras confronts as a result of gang violence and a high homicide rate is the murder of youths. The Central American country has the highest youth homicide rate in the world, which further highlights Central America’s ongoing problem with exposing young boys to violence early in their lives. Children living in Honduras, Guatemala, and El Salvador are ten times more likely to be murdered than a child living in the United States. As a result of organized crime, gang activity, and high rates of violence, boys born in Honduras experience a 1 in 9 chance of being murdered. Homicides resulting from gang violence have been noted as a significant factor behind the rise in youth migration out of the country in the past few years.

=== Illegal drug trade ===
Honduras is considered a major drug route to the US. Smuggling is said to have increased after the US suspended anti-drug support following the 2009 Honduran coup d'état. Weak domestic law enforcement institutions make Honduras a popular point of entry for drug routes through Central America.

==== Historical ====
In 1978 Policarpo Paz García overthrew Juan Alberto Melgar Castro in a "cocaine coup" financed by the Medellín Cartel-linked drug lord Juan Matta-Ballesteros. The CIA took "a close and friendly interest" in the coup as Paz, unlike Melgar, was a keen supporter of Nicaragua's Anastasio Somoza Debayle. Under Paz, the Honduran Army and the intelligence service received a cut of Matta-Ballesteros' profits in return for protection, as Honduras became a major shipment route for cocaine and marijuana from Colombia. When the US Drug Enforcement Administration set up its first office in Tegucigalpa in 1981, its resident agent "rapidly came to the accurate conclusion that the entire Honduran government was deeply involved in the drug trade."

The head of Honduran military intelligence, Leonides Torres Arias, formed a link between Matta-Ballesteros and the CIA, and in 1983 Matta-Ballesteros' airline SETCO (Services Ejectutivos Turistas Commander) received its first contract to ship arms from the United States to the Nicaraguan Contras, even as it was known that SETCO was smuggling cocaine into the US. This would later develop into the Iran-Contra Affair.

In 1988 Matta-Ballesteros was taken from his home in Tegucigalpa by United States Marshals, sent to the United States for trial, and convicted of the kidnap and assassination of Enrique Camarena, as well as other charges. According to the "Selections from the Senate Committee Report on Drugs, Law Enforcement and Foreign Policy chaired by Senator John F. Kerry", “the Honduran airline SETCO "was the principal company used by the Contras in Honduras to transport supplies and personnel for the FDN carrying at least a million rounds of ammunition, food, uniforms and other military supplies for the Contras from 1983 through 1985. SETCO received funds for Contra supply operations from the Contra accounts established by Oliver North.”

==== Transnational organized crime ====
Because of Honduras’ weak infrastructure, multiple transnational organizations across Latin America focus their operations in Honduras; over 79% of all cocaine routes originating in South America use Honduras as a central landing point. Once in the nation, major Honduran smuggling clans, the Valle and Cochiros, assist the transfer of drugs into Mexico and/or the United States. Many of these clans are assisted by Mexican cartels, who have gained increasing influence in Honduras and Central America following the Mexican drug war, which attempted to limit cartel activity in Mexico. The smuggling of illegal drugs often leads to violence and homicide, specifically in areas that are hotly contested by drug smugglers. The department of Atlántida is considered a major site of contestation, and accordingly, 1 out of every 1,000 citizens in the department are killed due to violent crime. This trend continues across Honduras, where major drug smuggling sites are frequently associated with high levels of violence.

==== Impact of corruption ====
A prominent factor behind the prevalence of drug trade in Honduras is corruption throughout the country across a variety of police forces and political positions. The extent of corruption within the police force has been highlighted by a former security chief who estimated that half the force has been corrupted by Mexican drug cartels. In addition, corrupt politicians allow the drug trade to thrive in Honduras by taking bribes from gangs and cartels, ensuring a favorable outcome for these groups. Recent Honduran efforts to uproot corruption have revealed corrupt members within the legislature, the judiciary branches, state law enforcement branches, and local state governments, all of whom were accused of collaborating with drug traffickers.

The judicial branch of Honduras’ government as well as the police force are both riddled with corruption, rendering them largely ineffective. In June 2020, a new criminal code came into effect. “This code essentially reduces penalties for politicians who get linked to organized crime by lowering all sentences for corruption related offenses. This code also includes alternative punishments to detention for lower level crimes, including partial prison sentences and conditional releases. Overall, impunity for human rights abuses, violent crime, and corruption remain the norm in Honduras’ judicial system, even as the prison population has mushroomed.”

For more see: Juan Orlando Hernández

However, the most prominent recent example of high-level corruption was former president Juan Orlando Hernández (2014-2022), who was arrested by U.S. officials in 2022. This occurred after his brother and former Honduran congressman, Tony Hernández, was arrested in November of 2018 in Miami. The U.S. government tried Tony Hernández for aiding drug traffickers, most prominently Joaquín "El Chapo" Guzmán. The U.S. Department of Justice accused Hernández of “[bribing] law enforcement officials to protect drug shipments, [arranging] for heavily armed security for cocaine shipments, and [brokering] large bribes from major drug traffickers to powerful political figures.” Tony Hernández was found guilty of these charges and sentenced to life in prison.

Notably, according to witnesses during the trial, one of these powerful political figures assisted by Tony Hernández was his brother, then the president of Honduras. While Juan Orlando Hernández denied the accusations at the time, even gaining re-election in 2017, he was eventually prosecuted following Xiomara Castro’s election in 2021. He was accused of similarly aiding cartels, alongside his brother, in return for bribes consisting of millions of dollars, which were allegedly used to finance his campaigns and further his own wealth. He was extradited to the United States in April of 2022, following Honduran court order in March of 2022 and is currently awaiting trial.

=== Money laundering ===
In 2022, a controversial reform to Honduras’ law against money laundering drew criticism from various parties. The reform effectively grants immunity to criminals by prohibiting the charging of money laundering solely based on unexplained wealth. Critics argue that the reform was approved as part of a larger strategy to restrict and shield against future investigations. The move has sparked concern about the potential for increased money laundering activity and impunity for those involved.

The revised law has resulted in the release of multiple individuals charged with laundering money for drug cartels. Additionally, several public officials have benefited from the reform, as their charges were dropped. This has raised questions about the motivations behind the reform, with critics alleging that it serves to provide immunity for those involved in illicit activities. The government's proposal to grant amnesty to officials who served under former President Manuel Zelaya has faced criticism, highlighting concerns about political immunity in the country.

== Gangs ==
Major gang violence in Honduras can be traced back to the 1970s, but severe issues of violence escalated significantly in the early 2000s with the emergence of major gangs, which rose in prominence following an increase in the deportation of criminals back to Honduras. This deportation largely occurred after 1996, when the United States passed the Illegal Immigration Reform and Immigrant Responsibility Act, which expedited the deportation process for those convicted of aggravated felonies. As of 2012, scholars estimate there are roughly 12,000 gang members in Honduras. Gang presence in Honduras is common where territory is controlled by members of rival gangs, the most powerful being the Mara Salvatrucha and the Barrio 18. However, other gangs have emerged as offshoots or challengers to these two major gangs. Groups like Chirizos, Los Vatos Locos, Los Tercereños, La Ponce, and Los Olanchano have all gained prominence in Honduras, typically focusing on more local businesses and further drawing territorial boundaries. These gangs use violence and threats to enforce their power. Members of the community who do not pay their "war taxes" to the gangs for protection are threatened and often killed simply for their disobedience. In a 2017 survey, more than 32,000 businesses reported having had to close in the last six years because of extortion threats from gang violence. It is partly due to the gang culture in Honduras that many people have risked illegal immigration to the United States.

In 2012, almost one fifth of Honduras’ 25,000 gang members were children, according to UNICEF. Since then, Honduran police have implemented a US sponsored program called Gang Resistance Education and Training (GREAT). This program aims to curb gang recruitment and discourage youths from beginning a life of crime. There is limited data on the effectiveness of this program in Honduras.

== Regional variations ==
Crime is not spread around all the country. In 2015, Tegucigalpa, San Pedro Sula and La Ceiba suffered more than 40% of the homicides in the country. The main reason for the concentrated violence is that these are the cities where the majority of Mara Salvatrucha and Barrio 18 members live. Violence rises from fights between the gangs to see who gains control over these regions.

Between 2005 and 2011, Honduras’ murder rate dramatically increased, yet 65% of murders occurred in only 5% of the nation’s municipalities. In La Ceiba, a city consistently ranking within the top five most murderous in the country, three fourths of violent deaths occurred in just one-third of the city’s neighborhoods.

Outside of these three main cities rate of homicides is much lower. In order to maintain control of territory and access to illicit markets, gangs will exercise extra-judicial authority over members of the public to create the feeling of unquestioned and complete control over local neighborhoods. Typically in these regions, a single armed group achieves a certain level of control over the population, so gangs do not fight against each other. The residents of these areas have reported to feel safer in these neighborhoods rather than in homicide hot spots, regardless of crimes like assaults, extortions or robbery still taking place.

== Effects of crime on migration ==
The rise of violence has had a considerable impact on Honduran migration. In the past, the reason behind Central Americans traveling to the U.S. was merely economic. Young men traveled in search of the American Dream and sent revenues to their families back in Honduras. Today the main causes of migration are violence and crime. Another aspect of Central American migration that has changed is that migrants are no longer primarily men, but also women, teenagers and even children. Whole families travel from Honduras to the U.S. in search for a more peaceful life. By 2015 174,000 people, 4% of the country's households, had left Honduras.

For several years, Honduras sent more unaccompanied minors to the United States than any other Central American country. But since the murder rate began decreasing in 2011, the number of children traveling alone has also been reduced by half. Therefore, Honduras is now third on the list of countries whence unaccompanied Central American minors fled, totaling around 18,000 in 2016. Sixty percent of unaccompanied minors report that they are fleeing violence, including physical violence, threats or extortion

Organized crime continues to be a leading cause in the necessary emigration of targeted groups such as journalists, environmental activists, lesbian, gay, bisexual, and transgender individuals, along with disabled persons. These groups are targeted by cartel and gang violence and hence they have to flee the country in order to survive.

== May 2026 Mass Killings ==
On May 21st, 2026, Honduras experienced a series of coordinated mass killings in the cities of Trujillo and Omoa. The first shooting, which took place at a ranch in Trujillo, killed almost 20 people. A few hours later, the second attack took place in Omoa near the Guatemalan border. Six people died, all of them being police officers.

=== Historical Context ===
The northern region of Honduras, which is known for its agriculture, plantations, and trade routes, has always fallen victim to organized crime, land disputes, and political conflicts. On June 25th, 1975, the Los Horcones massacre took place in Olancho. Fifteen people were murdered by landowners and military officers, most of whom were farmers, including a few priests and young women. The farmers who were killed were a part of the Union Nacional de Campesinos, or the National Farmers’ Union, which advocated for fair wages and safe working conditions for employees, while denouncing abusive practices by large landowners. This massacre highlighted the violence endured by farmers and the persecution from military forces, issues that continue to echo in the present day.

=== Political Implications and Government Response ===
Nasry Asfura, the current president of Honduras, has ordered military intervention and has pledged that those responsible will be held accountable. Ironically, these attacks are deeply tied to politics, as they occurred only about three months after Asfura was elected as the National Party candidate. The national party is considered conservative, and Asfura received Donald Trump’s unwavering support during his campaign. Asfura’s main message during his campaign centered on his determination to restore public safety, yet this attack underscores the ongoing violence he promised to end.

=== Systemic Issues and Pattern ===
When compared with other National Party regimes, this incident reflects a pattern of corruption and heavy reliance on the military by those in power. As a result, innocent civilians of underdeveloped communities become caught in the violence. Due to the leaders' failure to provide basic socio-economic improvements, crime is exacerbated in these areas. According to the Los Angeles Times, international organizations have condemned the militarized approach utilized by the Honduran government. La Vía Campesina, a renowned human rights group founded in 1993, spoke out against the attacks, stating that this event “demonstrates the vulnerability and lack of security in which our peasant communities live.” Ultimately, the recent wave of violence highlights how weak governance, economic inequality, and political transitions continue to claim the lives of the most vulnerable.

== Crime prevention ==
There have been many challenges to crime prevention. The vulnerability of certain communities to violence has been attributed to a variety of societal-level factors. These factors include the shift in the transnational drug trade, which has increased the availability of drugs and firearms; rising unemployment rates; and the rapid urbanization of these communities. The combination of these factors has deepened their susceptibility to violence. Apart from societal-level factors, political and institutional context has also been far from ideal for crime prevention. The absence of a coherent and transparent system of governance at the local level, combined with inadequate and unreliable law enforcement and justice institutions at the national level, has impeded civic engagement and limited the availability of necessary resources and services, creating barriers to effective prevention efforts. Violence-induced fear and insecurity among the population has also been an obstacle for organizations focused on crime prevention, as there is barely any active or social participation to support these organizations. Overall, the root causes of violent crime in Honduras are multi-faceted, and include factors such as the impact of the transnational drug trade, pervasive economic inequality, political polarization, and systemic governance challenges. These issues are deeply entrenched and extend beyond the capacity of individual neighborhoods to address effectively.

The United States Agency for International Development and the Bureau of International Narcotics and Law Enforcement Affairs have joined efforts to reduce the crime rate in Honduras. The U.S. has sent $200 million in aid to Honduras since 2009. These organizations started sending economic aid when the Honduran coup d'état took place. In 2015 around $18 million went to the Honduran police and military. However, even though the aid has been constant since 2009, in the summer of 2016 there was a bill introduced in Congress to cut the funding given to Honduras. The reason behind the suspension of the aid is the corruption and human rights violations that the money causes when given to the military or the police.

Other ways in which the aid has been distributed is through programs that identify children who present risk factors of joining gangs (such as a violent family environment, drug or alcohol abuse or being a victim of crime) and giving them counseling. This program, run by Creative Associates International, has proven to be successful; 77% of the children that attend this program do not get involved in crime or substance abuse after going through it. Another tactic has been creating centers that promote vocational training, these institutions provide mentors to Hondurans, teaches them skills to become barbers, electricians or bakers and then helps them to find jobs. Another contribution from the US government is funding the nonprofit Association for a More Just Society which focuses on creating the conditions for crimes to be prosecuted.

In Honduras, only 6% of collected taxes are spent in programs that reduce or prevent violence. Each economically active member of the population (EAP) invests $125 annually in terms of the national security budget. In contrast, in Nicaragua, each EAP contributes $497.

In addition to United States contributions, Honduras has also partnered with other Central American countries that deal with similar issues. Honduran police forces have been collaborating with Colombian, Mexican, and other Central American police forces; this bloc has been working to create a plan for unified police efforts against criminal activity. A similar program involving concordant anti-gang legislation across Central and South America has emerged as well. Moreover, multiple OAS conventions have been devoted to solving issues of corruption and general crime.

In Latin America, governments have historically responded with iron fist security strategies to combat organized crime and gang violence. Officials will implement tougher legislation and increase policing and mass detentions in order to show that there are consequences for joining these criminal entities. In 2018, the Fuerza Nacional Anti Maras y Pandillas was formed. This special unit was created to fight gangs and organized crime. It included officers from the police, the military, and the Attorney General’s Office. Security forces such as FNAMP have allegedly colluded with criminal groups and other state institutions, further contributing to the persistence of organized crime and gangs in Honduras.

=== Mano Dura laws ===
In 2003, the Honduran government introduced the Mano Dura laws as part of a zero-tolerance policy aimed at reducing violence and strengthening public security. These laws heavily empowered police and imposed harsher penalties for many offenses, including permitting gang members to be incarcerated simply for gang association in the absence of any specific criminal act.

Honduran police officers were authorized to arrest anyone at all related to gangs through indicators such as tattoos, baggy clothing, or even typical gang positions on street corners. To avoid being detected by police officers, members of gangs have been forced to change their territorial strategies. Since tattoos are such an easy way to identify a gang member, gangs have been forced to wear clothes covering their tattoos and to adopt a more casual appearance.

Although these laws were introduced with the intention of reducing gang violence, there is little evidence to suggest that they have been effective. Aside from an initial reduction in crime, the laws have not managed to significantly address the problem. In fact, the Mano Dura laws have had some unintended consequences, resulting in many gang members attempting to seek protection with branches of their gang in other countries such as El Salvador. Transnational gang relations have grown tremendously since the implementation of these laws, as evidenced by Mara Salvatrucha's extensive reach, spanning through the United States and even reaching cities in Canada. The laws have also led some gangs to voice their opposition with further acts of violence. One year after the introduction of the Mano Dura, members of MS-13 attacked a bus, killing 28 people and wounding 14. The perpetrators left a note claiming opposition to the death penalty, a major campaign issue in the upcoming presidential election and a large component of Mano Dura. They also threatened further violence, warning that "people should take advantage of this Christmas, because the next one will be worse." Consequences like this suggest that zero-tolerance policies have promoted further extremism in a country already shrouded by gang violence.

Another reason the Mano Dura policies have struggled to accomplish their goals is that the prison system in Honduras is not built to accommodate the increased volume of incarcerated individuals. Prison overcrowding has made it easier for gangs to function as there are not enough guards in many prisons to safely monitor the prisoners. According to the Center for Prevention, Treatment and Rehabilitation of Victims of Torture and their Relatives (CPTRT), there were 1,272 prison guards to attend to 10,300 inmates as of 2004, giving each guard the nearly impossible task of tending to 8 inmates. To maintain a basic level of security, the guards and inmates have agreed upon a prison order which allows prisoners a surprising amount of freedom but at the very least keeps them inside the confines of the prison. With more freedom inside the prisons, gang leaders can control the sale of food, commodities, and even the reception of visitors. In addition, given the relative security of their position in prison, they can safely organize and plan their criminal strategies. Another concern raised about these laws is their potential to be arbitrarily manipulated by law enforcement officials. Since people can be arrested for simple tattoos or hand gestures, police have to be trusted to correctly and fairly prosecute gang members. This process has clogged the judicial system to the point that the defendants are not always afforded fair trials.

=== Banco Continental ===
Jaime Rosenthal's family owned Banco Continental, then the eighth largest bank in Honduras, which on October 7, 2015, had its assets frozen by the United States under the Foreign Narcotics Kingpin Designation Act on charges that they laundered money for drug traffickers. Rosenthal has rebutted these charges, claiming, "we are sure that we will prevail in the trial because the accusations are false." The Rosenthals have an extensive fortune worth $690 million which they have amassed through their management of Grupo Continental, a massive conglomerate of businesses which includes the Banco Continental, a meat packing plant, and an alligator skin export company, among others. Specifically, the Rosenthal family has been accused by the United States for dealing with Cachiros, one of the largest drug transport clans in Central America. The Cachiros group was run by the Rivera Maradiaga family who went on the run after being specifically targeted by the United States Department of the Treasury and in early 2015, turned their top members in to US authorities. Jaime Rosenthal, who was 79 years old at the time, was placed under house arrest in San Pedro Sula while awaiting trial in the US. Rosenthal died of a heart attack in 2019 in San Pedro Sula.

=== 2022 state of emergency declaration ===
Honduran President Xiomara Castro declared a state of emergency on December 6, 2022, in order to target gangs and other criminal organizations. This followed a similar strategy implemented earlier in the year by El Salvador that led to tens of thousands of arrests. The declaration temporarily suspended some rights and significantly bolstered police power, including by permitting authorities to restrict the movement and assembly of citizens, detain suspects more easily, and to conduct searches without a warrant. The state of emergency initially covered only the two largest cities, Tegucigalpa and San Pedro Sula, but President Castro expanded the declaration in January 2023 to include a total of 123 cities and towns across the country. National Police Director Gustavo Sanchez supported the expansion, commenting that “the suspension of rights was extended to municipalities where, according to our analysis, criminal groups have migrated to evade the actions of police and the state.”

The first month of the emergency measures yielded arrests of 650 suspected gang members, and there have been 356 fewer murders recorded during the first two months of the emergency measures than the same time one year earlier.

== See also ==
- Femicides in Honduras
- Honduran gang crackdown
