= List of Honduran Jews =

The Jewish population of Latin America has risen to more than 500,000 – more than half of whom live in Argentina, with large communities also present in Brazil and Mexico.

The following is a list of some renowned past and present Honduran Jews (not all of them with both parents Jewish, not all of them practicing Judaism), arranged by their main field of activity:

- Boris Goldstein (Honduras), donated land for Maguen David Synagogue.
- Jacobo Goldstein, journalist, businessman.
- Ricardo Maduro Joest, Politician, Honduran ex president.
- Martin Baide Urmeneta, lawyer, journalist, politician.
- Jaime Rosenthal, businessman, politician.
- Yani Rosenthal, politician
- Yankel Rosenthal, C.D. Marathón president.
- Ruth Eisemann-Schier, a Honduran criminal who was the first woman to appear on the FBI's Ten Most Wanted list.
- Ulises Ramos- world Karate champion. 2010 World Martial Arts Games 5x medalist, 2017 NBL world champion flyweight points, WKU world champion 2019 gold -65 kg points, gold kata, WKU world champion gold -65 kg, silver open weight, gold Japanese kata, gold hardstyle forms, 2023 WKU world champion-65 kg points, gold japanese kata, silver open weight points, bronze hardstyle forms,

== See also ==
- List of Latin American Jews
- List of Hondurans
- Lists of Jews
