= Grupo Continental =

Grupo Continental may refer to

- Arca Continental, a Mexican beverage manufacturer, which merged with Grupo Continental in 2011
- Grupo Continental, a Honduras conglomeration of businesses, including Banco Continental
