= AJS (disambiguation) =

AJS may refer to:

- AJS, a British motorcycle maker
- American Journal of Science
- The American Journal of Semiotics
- American Journal of Sociology
- Association for a More Just Society
- Association for Jewish Studies
  - AJS Review, a journal
- Americans for Job Security
- American Judicature Society
