= History of the Jews in Honduras =

Jewish Hondurans
הונדורס יהודים

Total population
- 1,000

Languages
- Spanish, Hebrew, Ladino

Religion
- Judaism, Catholicism

Related ethnic groups
- Germans, Polish, Russians, Romanians, Arabs

The history of the Jews in Honduras begins in the colonial period, during the proceedings of the Inquisition with the arrival of sephardic Jews to Honduran soil. As of April 2020, in Honduras there are 390 self identified Jews who have gained the Honduran residence. It is estimated that the Jewish population in Honduras is approximately just over 1,000 people

Honduran Jews are able to practice Judaism peacefully and are included in Honduran politics and culture. The Jewish community is primarily concentrated in Tegucigalpa and San Pedro Sula, where there are synagogues. Honduras was one of the first countries to recognize the State of Israel, in 1948, and the Jewish community in Honduras has benefited greatly from Israeli aid.

== History ==
=== The Arrival of Jews in Honduras ===
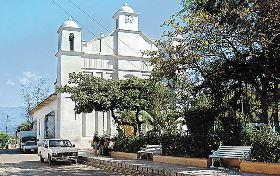
Several of the inhabitants of Santa Barbara are descendants of Sephardic Jewish immigrants who began to arrive from the 16th century.

Sephardic Jews crossed the Atlantic Ocean on Spanish ships. They first became settlers, then Officials of the Crown, sailors, merchants, and other professionals. Their vision was to reach a piece of land to call home, first in Seville, then in the Spanish viceroyalties. The municipality of Trinidad in the Department of Santa Bárbara has deep Jewish historical roots and is related to Jewish society. There are many other municipalities that share these foundational roots, but they are more Christianized.

When the Province of Honduras was founded and the city of Comayagua was designated as its capital, several Jews settled there. They were distributed throughout the Honduran territory as it grew in commercial importance, as a policy between the seventeenth and nineteenth centuries. Honduras was under the conservative administration of Captain-General José María Medina when the National Congress issued an Immigration Law on February 26, 1866. This law gave all foreigners who wanted to reside in the country access. The Political Constitution of 1876 also reflected the importance of immigration in the national territory.

=== 19th century ===
Between 1875 and 1915 (before the First World War), 45 million Europeans crossed the Atlantic in search of better living conditions on the American continent. Of these migrants, a total of 2,500,000 were Jews from different European contexts. With the opening of the country to the world, thanks to the liberal reform, various groups were given the opportunity to migrate to Honduras.

This migratory movement included numerous Jews who found a new home in Honduras where they could prosper and contribute to the development of the country's economy. The arrival of these immigrants enriched the country's ethnic diversity and also brought with them traditions that were integrated into Honduran society, thus strengthening the nation's social and economic growth at that time.

=== 20th century ===
The First World War led many Jewish merchants and financiers to take their fortunes out of Europe, with some moving to the United States and Latin American countries (mainly the Southern Cone) and others to Russia. In the case of Honduras, the arrival of European Jews began in full swing in 1920. Between 1920 and 1940, the majority of Jews who arrived in the country were Ashkenazis of German, Polish and Romanian origin fleeing Europe due to the onset of the Second World War. Many of these immigrated in 1939, when a total of 455 Germans were registered in Honduras, 95 of whom were Jewish.

The following year, a decree was issued during the administration of Doctor Vicente Mejía Colindres in which the Immigration Office was created and attached to the Ministry of the Interior. Colindres also oversaw the passage of a law that authorized foreigners of Arab, Chinese, Turkish, Syrian, Armenian, Palestinian, and African ethnicity, as well as Indians also called Colies, to immigrate to Honduras, provided that they bring 5,000 Silver Pesos and that they would make a deposit to the state coffers of 500 Silver Pesos per person within two months of arrival in the country. 25 Jewish citizens were naturalized between 1946 and 1956, 19 of which were Poles, which was equivalent to 76% of the naturalizations completed.

The president of Honduras allowed the entry of Jews during World War II, with the influence of the local Jewish community. In 1950 there were 40 Jewish families in Honduras. After the Second World War there was a brief boom in the community thanks to the arrival of dozens of new immigrants, but at the beginning of the 1950s most of them would emigrate to the south of the continent to Argentina, Uruguay and Chile where their governments were more inclined to receive Jews.

At the end of the 20th century during the government of Rafael Leonardo Callejas, more than a third of the Jews living in Honduras would leave for Israel, the United States, or Argentina due to the financial crisis in the country, depriving the country's Jewish population of much of its youth community. On 3 August 1997, the community in San Pedro Sula dedicated the Maguen David Synagogue to serve as a community center for future generations.

=== 21st century ===
In 2001, Honduras elected its first Jewish president, the businessman Ricardo Maduro Joest. He was a candidate for the national party and served his term from 2002 to 2006. This victory was an extraordinary case given that the vast majority of presidents of Honduras as well as the rest of Latin America until then had been Roman Catholics, and that the Jewish Honduran community had always been very small, although it did have some weight in the social and political sphere.

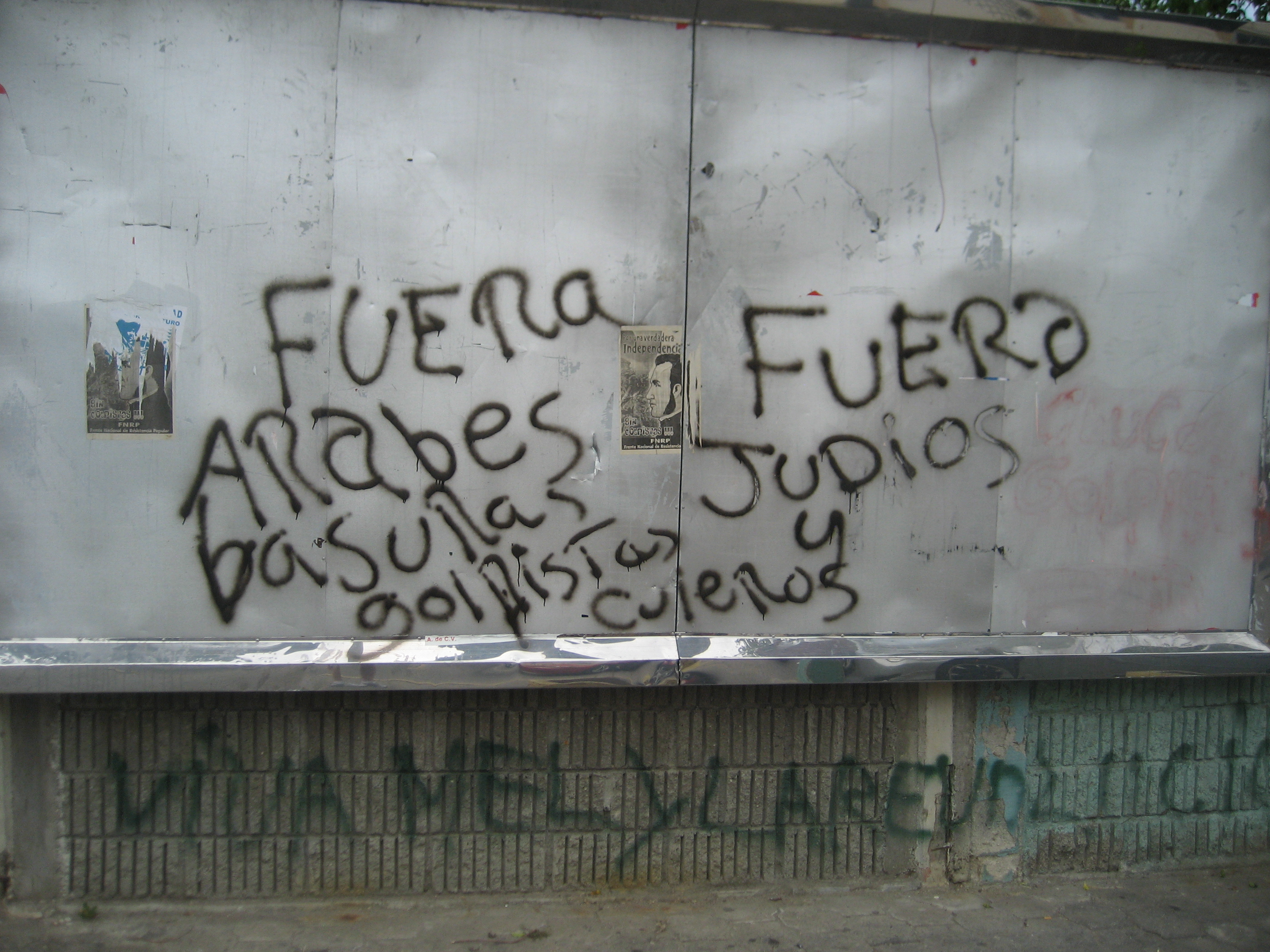
Anti-Arab and antisemitic graffiti in San Pedro Sula. Xenophobia and racism rose in Honduras during the 2009 coup.

With the 2009 Honduran constitutional crisis, the local Jewish community became embroiled in the controversy. Rumors spread throughout the Honduran media of Jewish and Israeli involvement in the coup d'état. A commentator on Radio Globo, David Romero Ellner, suggested on the air that perhaps it would have been better if the Jews had been exterminated in the Holocaust. His comments drew ire from ousted Honduran president Manuel Zelaya, the US Embassy in Tegucigalpa, and the Anti-Defamation League.

Juan Orlando Hernández led a pro-Israel government during his terms from 2014 to 2022. Israel under Prime Minister Benjamin Netanyahu became one of his greatest allies and the first country to recognize him after the allegations of electoral fraud in Hernández's re-election led to protests and subsequent repression that caused 30 deaths.

In recent years, some Honduran Jews have made aliyah to Israel due to antisemitic remarks.

In 2015, members of the Rosenthal family were charged with corruption and other crimes. Yankel Rosenthal, a former minister of investment, was arrested on 6 October 2015 after landing at Miami airport. He, together with his cousin Yani and uncle Jaime Rosenthal, a newspaper owner and four-time presidential candidate, were also charged with money laundering and other services that support the international narcotics trafficking activities of multiple Central American drug traffickers and their criminal organizations. Seven of their businesses were labelled under the US Kingpin Act as "specially designated narcotics traffickers". They have been accused of transferring drug money between accounts in New York and Honduras between 2004 and 2015.

=== Modern Day ===
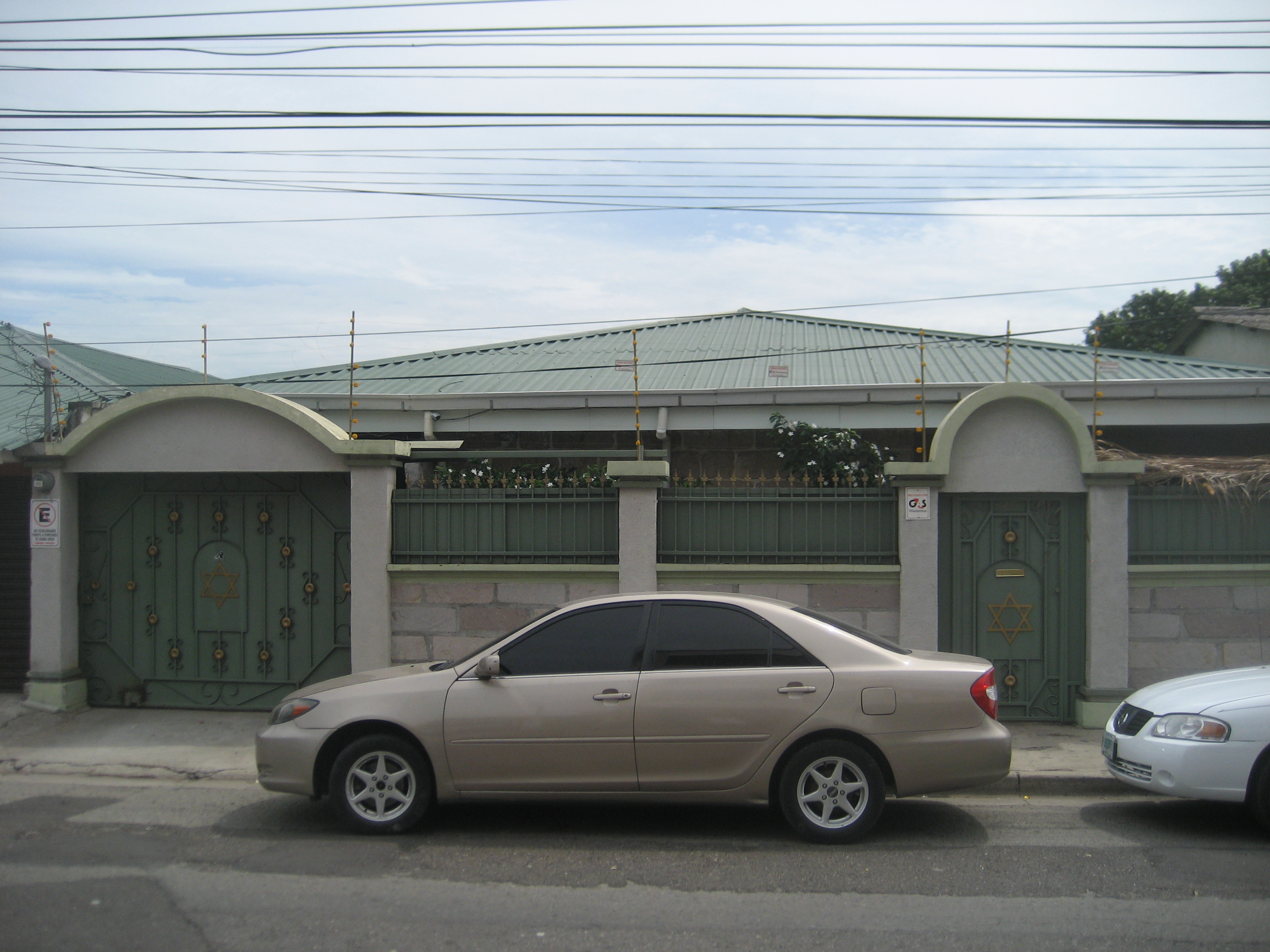
A Honduran Jewish home.

The Jewish community of Honduras lives in total social stability and mutual cooperation with the rest of the Honduran population, mainly Christians. Jews in Honduras are very acculturated to the Honduran identity, sharing and actively participating in the traditions, customs and daily life of the country. This harmony has allowed the construction of new synagogues, reflecting the growth and strengthening of the Jewish community in the country. In recent years, there has also been an increase in conversions of Hondurans to Judaism, indicating a growing interest in and broader cultural acceptance of religious diversity in Honduras.

As previously mentioned, the second or third generation Jews who descend from those Ashkenazim who came to the country at the end of the 19th century managed to adapt better to Honduran society. Together with a propensity for mixed marriages with the local Christian population, this allowed them and their descendants to fully integrate into the Honduran identity. This also brought religious change, with some becoming Secular Jews or converting to Christianity on Honduran soil.

== Judaism in Honduras ==
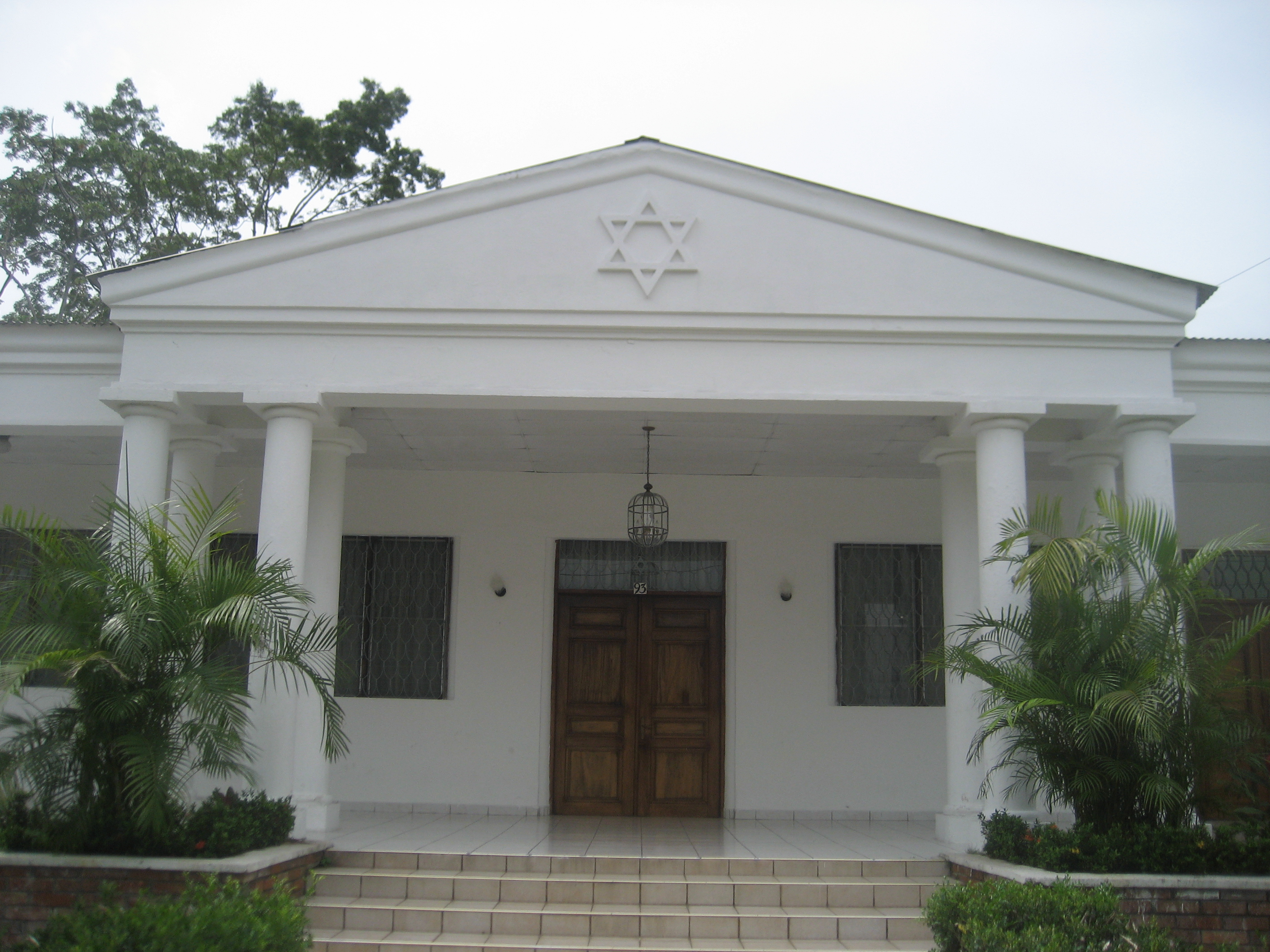
Maguen David Synagogue in San Pedro Sula is one of the most famous non-Christian religious temples in Honduras.

There are two Jewish congregations in Honduras, one located in Tegucigalpa and the other in San Pedro Sula. The first synagogue in Tegucigalpa, the Shevit Ajim Synagogue, was built in 1997. However, it was destroyed in 1998 by Hurricane Mitch, and rebuilt in 2002 with international aid. The other synagogue in Honduras is the Maguen David Synagogue, located in San Pedro Sula. There are no Jewish day schools in Honduras, but educational activities like Jewish Sunday school and Talmud Torah classes are generally available in Tegucigalpa.

== Notable Honduran Jews ==
Many Honduran Jews have made contributions to society in fields such as politics, journalism, business, and medicine.

- Boris Goldstein: donated land for Maguen David Synagogue.
- Jacobo Goldstein: journalist, businessman.
- Ricardo Maduro Joest: Politician, Honduran ex-president.
- Martin Baide Urmeneta: lawyer, journalist politician..
- Jaime Rosenthal: businessman, politician.
- Yani Rosenthal: politician
- Yankel Rosenthal: C.D. Marathón president.

== Jewish Surnames in Honduras ==
In Honduras, the following Central European surnames are Ashkenazi Jewish; Hispanic surnames appear related to certain local populations of Hispanic Jewish origin. Apart from this, in general they did not start in Jewish families, and if that were the case, a genealogical investigation is necessary to determine if the name was inherited from them or from their slaves or indigenous people sponsored by them.

=== Sephardic ===
- Anchecta
- Arias
- Behar
- Benveniste
- Bueso
- Caballero
- Cáceres
- Calderón
- Carbajal
- Carmona
- Castellanos
- Castro
- Cuellar
- Cuenca
- Curiel
- Chávez
- De Toledo
- Duran
- Domínguez
- Enamorado
- Espinoza
- Fajardo
- Fernández
- Fuentes
- Gómez
- Guzmán
- Lara
- López
- Leiva
- Luna
- Mata
- Miranda
- Montoya
- Moreira
- Navarro
- Núñez
- Pardo
- Perdomo
- Pérez
- Pinto
- Paz
- Rivera
- Romero
- Rodríguez
- Tábora
- Toledo
- Torres
- Trejo
- Ventura
- Zaldívar

Names like Benveniste, Calderon, Gomes, Pardo, and Rodríguez are typical Spanish names, presumably brought over to Honduras by escapees of the Spanish Inquisition. Behar is typical of Jews from the Turkish Ottoman Empire.

=== Ashkenazim ===
- Rosenthal
- Starkman
- Seidel
- Goldstein
- Danilov
- Silverstein

== See also ==
- List of Honduran Jews
- Crypto-Judaism
- History of the Jews in Latin America
- List of Latin American Jews
- Arab immigration to Honduras
- Italian migration to Honduras
- Spanish migration to Honduras
