= Banco Continental =

Banco Continental may refer to:

- BBVA Continental, a Peruvian bank
- Banco Continental, a Honduran bank
