= ASJ =

ASJ may stand for:

- Amami-Oshima Airport, Amami Ōshima, Kagoshima Prefecture, Japan
- ICAO code for Air Satellite, Canada
- Asiatic Society of Japan
- Asociación para una Sociedad más Justa in Honduras
- Austin Seferian-Jenkins, American former football tight end
