= Banco de Occidente =

Banco de Occidente may refer to

- Banco de Occidente Credencial, a financial bank in Colombia
- Banco de Occidente (Honduras), a financial bank in Honduras
