= De Swardt =

de Swardt is a surname. Notable people with the surname include:

- Abraham de Swardt (born 1963), South African cricketer
- Albé de Swardt (born 1990), South African rugby player
- Cobus de Swardt, South African sociologist
- Mariaan de Swardt (born 1971), South African tennis player
- Ruan de Swardt (born 1998), South African cricketer
