= Yani Rosenthal =

Honduran politician (born 1965)

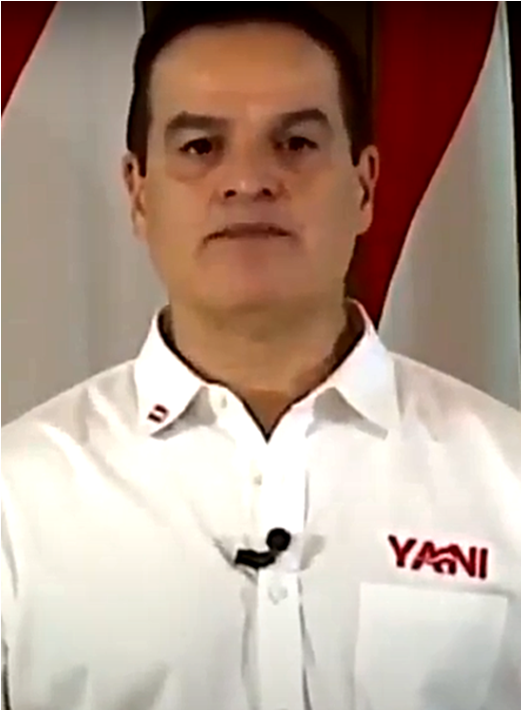

President of the Liberal Party
- In office Unknown – 18 or 19 December 2025
- Preceded by: Unknown
- Succeeded by: Roberto Contreras Mendoza

Member of National Congress of Honduras
- In office 25 January 2010 – 25 January 2014
- Constituency: Cortés Department

Minister of the Presidency of Honduras
- In office 27 January 2006 – 31 December 2007
- President: Manuel Zelaya

Personal details
- Born: Yani Benjamin Rosenthal Hidalgo; 14 July 1965 (age 61) San Pedro Sula, Honduras
- Party: Liberal
- Parent: Jaime Rosenthal (father)
- Education: Honduras National Autonomous University and INCAE Business School

Yani Benjamin Rosenthal Hidalgo (born 14 July 1965) is a businessman, politician, and convicted criminal affiliated with the Liberal Party of Honduras.

He was the Minister of the Presidency under President Manuel Zelaya from 2006 to 2008, and a deputy in the National Congress representing the Cortés Department from 2010 to 2014. In 2012, he was a presidential pre-candidate and currently presides over the Central Executive Council of the Liberal Party, having secured this position in the internal elections of March 2021.

In December 2017, Rosenthal was convicted, along with his cousin Yankel Rosenthal, of laundering drug proceeds for the Cachiros, a prominent Honduran drug trafficking organization and cartel.

== Early life and education ==
Yani Benjamin Rosenthal Hidalgo was born on July 14, 1965, in San Pedro Sula, Honduras, into the prominent Jewish-Honduran Rosenthal family. His parents are Jaime Rosenthal and Miriam Marina Hidalgo de Rosenthal.

He has a sister, Patricia, and three brothers: Jaime (deceased), Carlos José and César Augusto. He is married to Claudia Madrid. They have four daughters: Isabella, Victoria, Elissa and Alexandra.

He completed his primary and secondary education at the Escuela Internacional Sampedrana in San Pedro Sula. Rosenthal earned a law degree from the UNAH-Universidad Nacional Autónoma de Honduras (Honduras National Autonomous University) in 1987. He later pursued a Master’s in Business Administration at INCAE Business School, where he graduated at the top of his class with summa cum laude honors in 2000. In 1998 the Honduras Supreme Court of Justice granted him the title of Notary public.

In 1993 his house suffered damage from a bomb attack. Rosenthal was Director of Diario Tiempo, part of the Grupo Continental business conglomerate, (Honduras Times Newspaper) and published a series of articles about military abuses, and, as his home was the temporary shelter for a witness to a military-performed killing, it has been alleged that the military was involved in the bomb attack.

== Political career ==
Rosenthal began his political involvement as an activist for the Liberal Party (Honduras) at a young age. He served as an alternate member of the Liberal Party's Central Executive Committee from 2001 to 2005 and later became a full member, holding the position of Secretary of International Relations from 2005 to 2009.

In 2006, following the election of Manuel Zelaya as President of Honduras, Rosenthal was appointed Minister of the Presidency. Rosenthal became a central figure in the administration and gained public recognition. A 2006 Diario La Tribuna poll indicated he had the highest favorable opinion among Zelaya’s ministers.

On 31 December 2007, Rosenthal resigned as Minister of the Presidency to pursue the Liberal Party's 2009 presidential nomination. He initially ran in the party’s primary elections but later allied with Roberto Micheletti. His movement was ultimately unsuccessful in the 2008 internal elections. Despite this, Rosenthal remained politically active and was elected as a congressman for the 2010–2014 term.

During his tenure in Congress, Rosenthal was a vocal critic of President Porfirio Lobo’s 2010 tax reform package, arguing that the new taxes disproportionately affected Honduras’ poorest citizens.

In 2012, he ran as a presidential pre-candidate but did not secure the nomination. After a period of political inactivity due to legal challenges in the United States, Rosenthal returned to Honduras in 2020, where he revived his Yanista Movement and won the Liberal Party (Honduras)'s 2021 presidential nomination. He placed third in the November 2021 general elections, but remained an influential figure within the party.

In 2024, he played a key role in welcoming prominent political figures Salvador Nasralla and Jorge Cálix into the party ahead of the 2025 internal elections. This move led to the largest turnout for the party in years, reinforcing its position as a major political force.

== Legal Indictment and Criminal Conviction ==
In 2015, Yani Rosenthal, along with his cousin Yankel Rosenthal and his father Jaime Rosenthal, was indicted under the Kingpin Act by U.S. authorities.

Ultimately, both Yani and Yankel Rosenthal pled guilty to crimes involving money laundering and providing financial services to drug traffickers on December 15, 2017 and August 16, 2017 respectively. Yani Rosenthal was sentenced to 36 months and Yankel Rosenthal was sentenced to 29 months in Federal U.S. Prison.

The U.S. government sought to extradite Jaime Rosenthal, but the request was unsuccessful. Jaime Rosenthal remained in Honduras, where he died on 12 January 2019.

== Business career ==
Yani Rosenthal was an active participant in Grupo Continental, a major Honduran business conglomerate founded by his family. The group operated across multiple sectors, including banking, media, insurance, agriculture, and real estate, and was one of the most influential economic forces in Honduras.

In 2015, following the U.S. indictment of members of the Rosenthal family, the Honduran government ordered the closure of Banco Continental, as well as several other companies within the group. This decision resulted in the loss of approximately 40,000 jobs, significantly impacting the country's economy.

== 2021 Presidential campaign ==
Following his prison sentence, Yani Rosenthal returned to Honduras in 2020, where he re-entered politics and became the presidential candidate for the Liberal Party of Honduras in the 2021 Honduran General Election. He won the party-internal primaries, held on 14 March 2021, against his competitors Luis Zelaya, then Chairman of the Liberal Party, and Ángel Darío Banegas Darío Banegas, a Member of Congress and TV-Show host. Yani Rosenthal gained 49.97% of votes, Luis Zelaya gained 33.94% and Darío Banegas 16.09%.

Following the primaries he entered the second round of campaigning. Together with Nasry Asfura (National Party) and Xiomara Castro (LIBRE) he was considered to be among the top-three contenders for the presidential elections held on 28 November 2021.

His campaign was ultimately unsuccessful, gaining only 10% of the national vote. The Liberal Party suffered their lowest vote percentage in any election since the party's founding in 1891. Rosenthal would subsequently step-down as the president of the Liberal Party of Honduras.

Party political offices
Preceded by Luis Zelaya	Liberal nominee for President of Honduras; 2021	Succeeded by Salvador Nasralla
