= Yankel Rosenthal =

Honduran businessman (born 1968)

Minister of Investment of Honduras
- In office 2014–2015
- President: Juan Orlando Hernández

Personal details
- Born: Yankel Rosenthal Coello; 31 October 1968 (age 57) Honduras
- Party: Liberal
- Relations: Yani Rosenthal (Cousin); Jaime Rosenthal (Uncle)

Yankel Rosenthal Coello (born October 31, 1968) is a Honduran businessman, politician, and convicted criminal who is the current president and co-owner of C.D. Marathón.

Rosenthal Coello served as the minister of investment of Honduras from 2014 to 2015 under then-president Juan Orlando Hernández.

== Early life ==
Yankel Rosenthal Coello was born on October 31, 1968, in Honduras. Rosenthal Coello is a member of the Jewish-Honduran Rosenthal Family, a prominent oligarch family from Honduras involved in business and politics. The family owns Groupo Continental, a Honduran conglomeration of businesses founded in 1929

He is the nephew of former Honduran vice president Jaime Rosenthal and cousin of former minister of the presidency and presidential candidate Yani Rosenthal.

== Business career ==
Rosenthal Coello is the current president and part-owner of C.D. Marathón, a Honduran football association. The Yankel Rosenthal Stadium was commissioned by Rosenthal Coello who named it after himself.

== Legal Issues and Criminal Conviction ==
In 2015, Yankel Rosenthal, along with his cousin Yani Rosenthal and uncle Jaime Rosenthal were designated by the U.S. Department of the Treasury’s Office of Foreign Assets Control (OFAC) as Specially Designated Narcotics Traffickers. Following this designation, the Drug Enforcement Agency (DEA) and the U.S. Attorney’s Office for the Southern District of New York (SDNY) took action against the Rosenthal family and Rosenthal Coello was arrested in the United States.

Ultimately, both Yani and Yankel Rosenthal pled guilty to crimes involving money laundering and providing financial services to drug traffickers on December 15, 2017, and August 16, 2017, respectively.

Yankel Rosenthal was sentenced to 29 months in Federal U.S. Prison. Yani Rosenthal was subsequently sentenced to 36 months.

The U.S. government sought to extradite Jaime Rosenthal, but the request was unsuccessful. Jaime Rosenthal remained in Honduras, where he died on 12 January 2019.
