= Ketakandriana Rafitoson =

Malagasy political scientist and human rights activist

- Occupations: political scientist and human rights activist
- Known for: Wake Up Madagascar

Ketakandriana Rafitoson is a Malagasy political scientist and human rights activist. She serves as executive director for Transparency International’s Initiative Madagascar and is a member of the Young African Activist Network. In 2018, Rafitoson spoke about Malagasy Presidential candidates on a French TV Network, and as a result was harassed and received death threats once back in Madagascar.

== Biography ==
Ketakandriana Rafitoson was born in Tana, Madagascar to Catholic parents. She attended College Saint Michel Amparibe. She later went on to study Political Science at the Catholic University in Madagascar where she began to write about democracy and human rights.

Upon graduating, she was selected to serve as a judge on the judiciary of Madagascar. However, upon realizing the level of corruption within the organization, she resigned and pursued a master's program. During this time, she began consulting for the energy sector where she came into contact with Jesuits who recommended her to the International Center for Nonviolent Action at the Fletcher Summer Institute of Tufts University. Rafitoson founded Wake Up Madagascar in 2013 with the aim of fostering revolution in Madagascar. In 2018, she resigned her position as an energy consultant due to frustrations over corruption levels. She was then contacted by Transparency International to head their Madagascar office, which she accepted, and received a PhD in 2019.

In 2022, she and a colleague faced criminal charges for their work investigating corruption in the lychee trade between Madagascar and France.
