= Canal 11 (Honduras) =

Television station

- Type: Free-to-air television network
- Country: Honduras

Programming
- Language: Spanish
- Picture format: HDTV 1080i

Ownership
- Owner: R-Media

Availability

Terrestrial
- Analog VHF: Channel 11

Canal 11 is a nationwide television station in Honduras. It started broadcasting in November 1996 and it is a Grupo Continental company.

== History ==
Canal 11 launched on November 11, 1996 (the eleventh day of the eleventh month); over the course of its history the channel started investing heavily in the creation of local productions, such as Calle 7 Honduras (adapted from the Chilean format), A Toda Máquina and Yo Me Llamo Honduras.

In May 2003 the channel signed an output deal with Venevisión Internacional, which at the time was one of the most important agreements the channel had signed to date.

The channel was positioned as the fastest-growing channel in terms of viewership in 2007; on November 22 that year, the channel held a special ceremony for its eleventh anniversary.

In the wake of economic pressure by the government in 2015 due to Grupo Continental's connections to drug trafficking, there was a possible threat in late October that year to close the channel.
