= El Tiempo (Honduras) =

Honduran publication

- Website type: Daily newspaper
- Headquarters: San Pedro Sula
- Owner: Jaime Rosenthal
- Website: tiempo.hn
- Current status: Active

El Tiempo is a Honduran daily newspaper owned by Jaime Rosenthal.

== History ==
On 31 August 2000, the internet domain www.tiempo.hn was purchased by Banco Continental with a 15-year right of possession.

On 19 July 2019, the site www.tiempo.hn ranked eighth in Honduras.

== Music chart ==
El Tiempo had previous published the Honduras Top 50 music chart in the country. Chart rankings were based on radio play and surveyed through radio stations in San Pedro Sula, Tegucigalpa, La Ceiba, Puerto Cortés, Choluteca and Roatán.
