= Patricia Moreira =

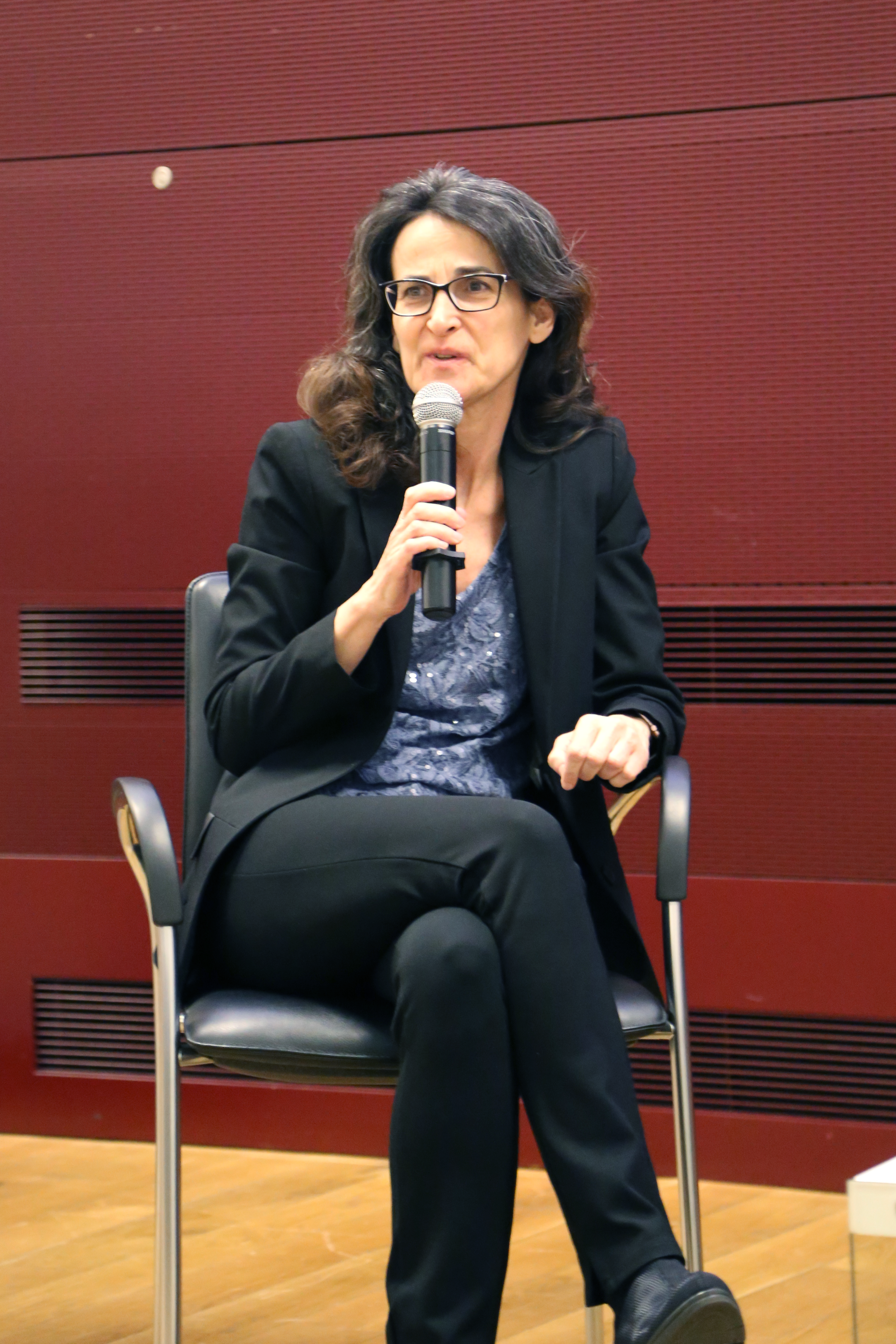
- Patricia Moreira at the Future Against Corruption Award Ceremony
- Education: University of California; INSEAD
- Occupation: Managing director

Patricia Moreira is a Brazilian activist, who was the managing director of the international secretariat of Transparency International, an organization that campaigns against corruption, between October 2017 and February 2020.

== Early life and education ==
Moreira is Spanish-Brazilian. She has a BA in Economics from the University of California, Los Angeles, an MBA from INSEAD, France, and conducted PhD research in Social Entrepreneurship at ICADE University in Madrid.

== Career ==
Moreira worked as a management consultant for Juárez & Associates and Arthur D. Little for ten years, and then for the Spanish aid organisation Ayuda en Acción, rising to the position of director general. She was CEO of Ayuda en Acción from 2009.

In October 2017, she succeeded Cobus de Swardt as head of Transparency International. During her tenure, Moreira grew the organisation’s income and reduced its number of underfunded projects.

Moreira was a board member of the United Nations Global Compact and a Council representative on the International Land Coalition. In 2018 she spoke at the 18th International Anti-Corruption Conference (IACC) in Copenhagen, Denmark, arguing that "corruption hits most the poor who suffer the consequences of corrupt regimes." In 2019, she admonished Western banks for facilitating corruption in Gambia.

In 2019 she argued that citizen's rights and democratic institutions were threatened by the trend for more authoritarian and populist regimes across the world which should be resisted by greater checks and balances.

A news article published in 2019 by The Guardian reported that staff at the Transparency International Secretariat complained about bullying and harassment within the organisation. Two investigations were launched after the allegations. The investigation conducted by the law firm Taylor Wessing documented individual incidents "in which the values/principles of transparency and accountability were not ensured entirely, and one case that might qualify as harassment at the workplace." The investigation concluded, however, that "these behaviours did not constitute a systematical breach of the TI-S Code of Conduct or TI values and its guiding principles, but were related to lack of open communication."

Moreira disputed the findings of the investigation and claimed she had not been given a chance to respond to the allegations. Following a legal complaint from Moreira, Transparency International was forced to withdraw the publication of the investigation reports from its website. She also filed a complaint against the Board of Transparency International and claimed there were toxic office politics at the organisation. In February 2020, she was dismissed from Transparency International without explanation.

It was claimed that Moreira's mandate and efforts to restructure the Transparency International Secretariat, and her own accusations of bullying made against Board members, upset entrenched interests at the organisation and ultimately led to her dismissal.

Investigations specialist Harriet Witchell has stated that the Transparency International board’s handling of the complaints process was beset by conflicts of interest and failed to address allegations of misconduct made against the board.
