= Transparency International =

International non-governmental organization

- Abbreviation: TI
- Formation: February 9, 1993
- Founder: Laurence Cockcroft, Peter Conze, Peter Eigen, Fritz Heimann, Michael Hershman, Kamal Hossain, Gerald Parfitt, Jeremy Pope, Roy Stacy, Frank Vogl, Oby Ezekwesili
- Type: International non-governmental organization
- Legal status: Eingetragener Verein (German registered voluntary association)
- Purpose: Combat corruption, crime prevention
- Headquarters: Berlin, Germany
- Location(s): Alt-Moabit 96; 10559 Berlin, Germany
- Coordinates: 52.5238°N 13.3450°E
- Region served: Global
- Chief Executive Officer: Maíra Martini
- Chair: François Valérian
- Vice-Chair: Ketakandriana Rafitoson
- Website: www.transparency.org

Transparency International e.V. (TI) is a German registered association founded in 1993 by former employees of the World Bank. Based in Berlin, its nonprofit and non-governmental purpose is to take action to combat global corruption with civil societal anti-corruption measures and to prevent criminal activities arising from corruption. Its most notable publications include the Global Corruption Barometer and the Corruption Perceptions Index.

TI is an umbrella organization with more than 100 national chapters, which engage in fighting perceived corruption in their home countries. TI is a member of G20 Think Tanks (T20) as well as Civil Society 20, UNESCO (consultative status), United Nations Global Compact, Sustainable Development Solutions Network and shares the goals of peace, justice, strong institutions and partnerships of the United Nations Sustainable Development Group (UNSDG). TI is a social partner of Global Alliance in Management Education. TI confirmed the dis-accreditation of the national chapter of United States in 2017 and a new TI USA chapter was established in 2020. According to the 2014 Global Go To Think Tank Index report, TI was number 9 of 100 in the Top Think Tanks Worldwide (non-US) category and number 27 of 150 in the Top Think Tanks Worldwide (US and non-US) category.

== History ==
Transparency International was founded on 9 February 1993 in The Hague, Netherlands; it was formally registered on 15 June 1993 in Berlin, Germany. According to political scientist Ellen Gutterman, "TI's presence in Germany, and indeed its organizational development and rise from a small operation to a prominent international TNGO, benefited from the activities and personal connections of at least three key German individuals: Peter Eigen, Hansjoerg Elshorst, and Michael Wiehen". The other founding members include: Peter Conze (a former regional director of GIZ), Laurence Cockcroft, Oby Ezekwesili and Frank Vogl (of the World Bank), Fritz Heimann of General Electric, Michael J. Hershman of US military intelligence, Kamal Hossain (former Minister of Foreign Affairs of Bangladesh), Gerald Parfitt (formerly of PricewaterhouseCoopers Ukraine), Jeremy Pope and Roy Stacy.

An important moment in its history was in 1995 when TI developed the Corruption Perceptions Index (CPI). The CPI ranks nations on the prevalence of corruption within each country, based upon surveys of business people. The CPI was subsequently published annually. It was initially criticized for poor methodology and unfair treatment of developing nations, while also being praised for highlighting corruption.

== Areas of work and products ==
Transparency International is the global civil society organization leading the fight against corruption. It brings people together in a powerful worldwide coalition to end the devastating impact of corruption on men, women and children around the world. TI's mission is to create change towards a world free of corruption.

The organization defines corruption as the abuse of entrusted power for private gain which eventually hurts everyone who depends on the integrity of people in a position of authority. It develops tools for fighting corruption and works with other civil society organizations, companies and governments to implement them. Since 1995, TI has issued an annual Corruption Perceptions Index (CPI); it also publishes a Global Corruption Report, a Global Corruption Barometer, and a Bribe Payers Index. In the years leading up to 2030, Transparency International is dedicated to leading the global fight against corruption via its strategy: "Holding Power to Account – A Global Strategy Against Corruption 2021–2030". It sets out how the Movement aims to contribute to "a more positive future; a world in which power is held to account, for the common good".

=== Corruption Perceptions Index ===
The Corruption Perceptions Index (CPI) ranks countries and territories based on how corrupt their public sector is perceived to be. It is a composite index – a combination of polls – drawing on corruption-related data collected by a variety of reputable institutions. The CPI reflects the views of observers from around the world. The Corruption Perceptions Index has been criticized for measuring perception and not reality. The creators of the index argue that "perceptions matter in their own right, since ... firms and individuals take actions based on perceptions". TI itself agrees with the CPI having limitations, but claims that the CPI is the best tool available for assessing corruption on a high level.

According to the newspaper Le Monde: "In its main surveys, Transparency International does not measure the weight of corruption in economic terms for each country. It develops a Corruption Perception Index (CPI) based on surveys conducted by private structures or other NGOs: the Economist Intelligence Unit, backed by the British liberal weekly newspaper The Economist, the American neoconservative organization Freedom House, the World Economic Forum, or large corporations. (...) The CPI ignores corruption cases that concern the business world. So, the collapse of Lehman Brothers (2008) or the manipulation of the money market reference rate (Libor) by major British banks revealed in 2011 did not affect the ratings of the United States or United Kingdom." A common counter argument is that it is not plausible to ever measure the true scale and depth of a highly complex issue like corruption with a single number, and then rank countries accordingly.

=== International Anti-Corruption Conference ===
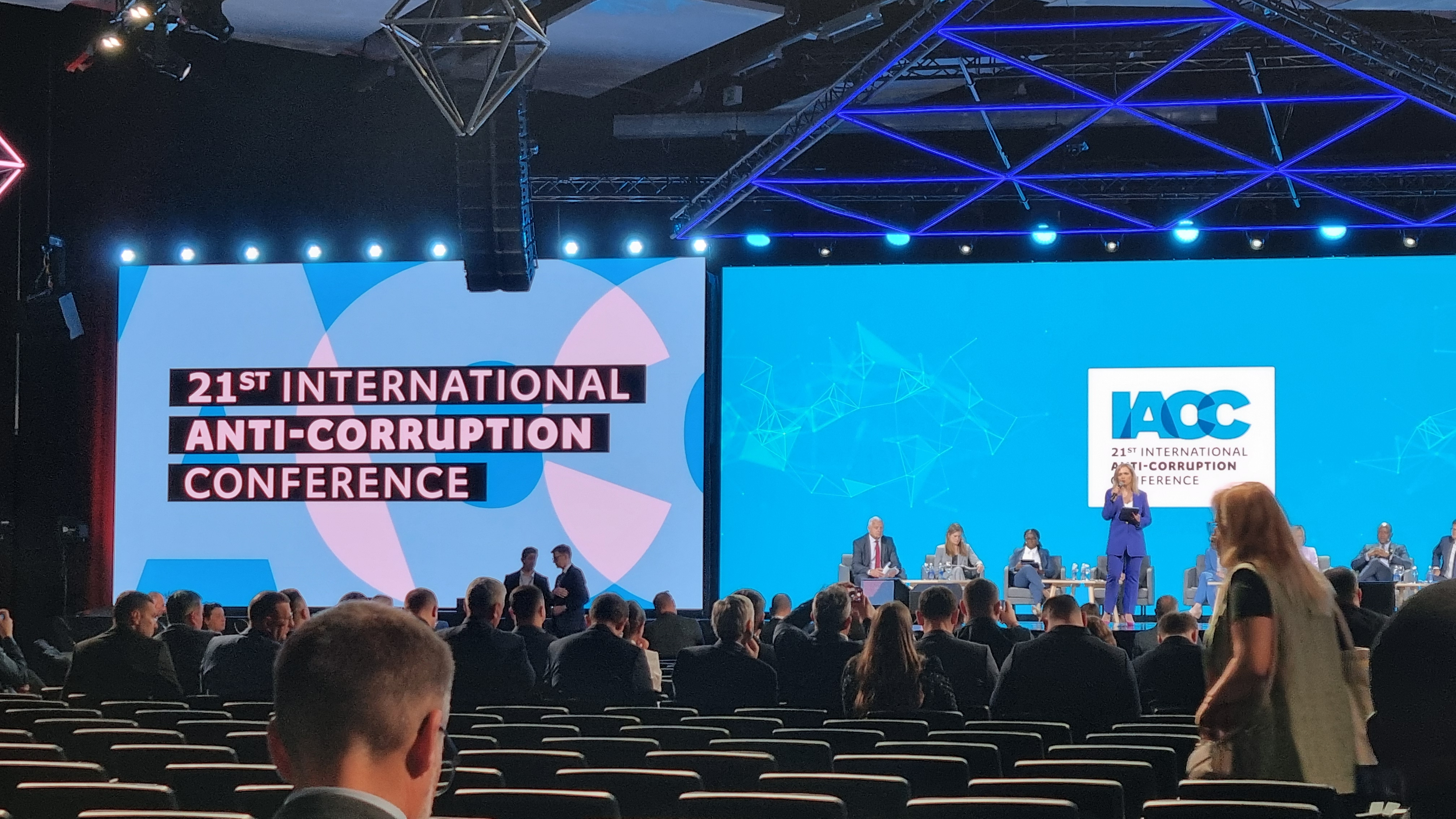
IACC 2024 plenary session in Vilnius

First held in 1983, the International Anti-Corruption Conference (IACC) is a series of international conferences organized by the IACC Council, in association with local governments and organizations, with TI as its secretariat. The conferences take place every two years in different countries.

=== Global Anti-Corruption Consortium (GACC) ===
Since 2016, TI has partnered with the Organized Crime and Corruption Reporting Project (OCCRP). The partnership enables knowledge and evidence gathered through OCCRP's corruption investigations to inform TI's policy and legal advocacy. The programme is co-funded by three governments, including the US, and private donors.

=== Defence and Security ===
Defence and Security is a separate centre of excellence within the global Transparency International Movement, focusing on highlighting corruption in defence and security and strengthening defence integrity in three main areas - Responsible Defence Governance, Conflict & Insecurity and Industry Integrity.

As well as research reports, the Defence and Security centre produces two indices measuring different aspects of defence industry integrity:

- The Government Defence Integrity Index first published in 2013 measures corruption in the defence sector of 82 countries. Some governments have expressed criticism towards the methodology of the report. TI defended the report and stressed the importance of transparency in the military sector. The plan was to publish the index every two years.
- The Defense Companies Index (on Anti-Corruption and Corporate Transparency) report first published in 2012. A second report was published in 2015 before the methodology was overhauled for third report, published in 2020. It is a research report that assesses the levels of public commitment to anti-corruption and transparency in the corporate policies and procedures of 134 of the world’s largest defence companies.

=== Other key products ===
- The Global Corruption Barometer (GCB) is a survey that asks citizens about their direct personal experience of corruption in their daily lives.
- The Global Corruption Report picks a specific topic like corruption in climate change for example and provides in-depth research.
- National integrity system assessments are designed to provide comprehensive analysis on a given country's mechanisms to fight corruption.
- The Bribe Payers Index (BPI) first published in 1999 which ranked nations according to the perceived likelihood that a country's multinational corporations would offer bribes. The last edition was released in 2011 after which the project was closed for funding reasons. The Journal of Business Ethics states "Bribery in international business transactions can be seen as a function of not only the demand for such bribes in different countries, but the supply, or willingness to provide bribes by multinational firms and their representatives. This study addresses the propensity of firms from 30 different countries to engage in international bribery".
- The Exporting Corruption report first published in 2005. It is a research report that rates the bribery-related performance of leading global exporters, including countries that are signatories of OECD Anti-Bribery Convention.

=== Sexual corruption ===
Since 2023, Transparency International has resolved to combat sexual corruption or sextortion, which occurs "when a person abuses their power to obtain sex or acts of a sexual nature in exchange for a service or benefit that is connected to the entrusted authority", and mostly affects women and girls. The issue has, for example, been linked to access to higher education in Rwanda, and to education and policing services in Ireland and Northern Ireland.

== The movement ==
Transparency International consists of chapters – locally established, independent organizations – that address corruption in their respective countries. In Transparency International, the collective of chapters is referred to as The Movement. As chapters are staffed with local experts they are ideally placed to determine the priorities and approaches best suited to tackling corruption in their countries. This work ranges from visiting rural communities to provide free legal support to advising their government on policy reform. From small bribes to large-scale looting, corruption differs from country to country. Corruption does however not stop at national borders. The chapters play a crucial role in shaping its collective work and realizing its regional and global goals. The ambition is for chapters to be self-funded and autonomous. Correspondingly, the Secretariat in Berlin is called a secretariat to differentiate it from a headquarters.

=== Secretariat ===
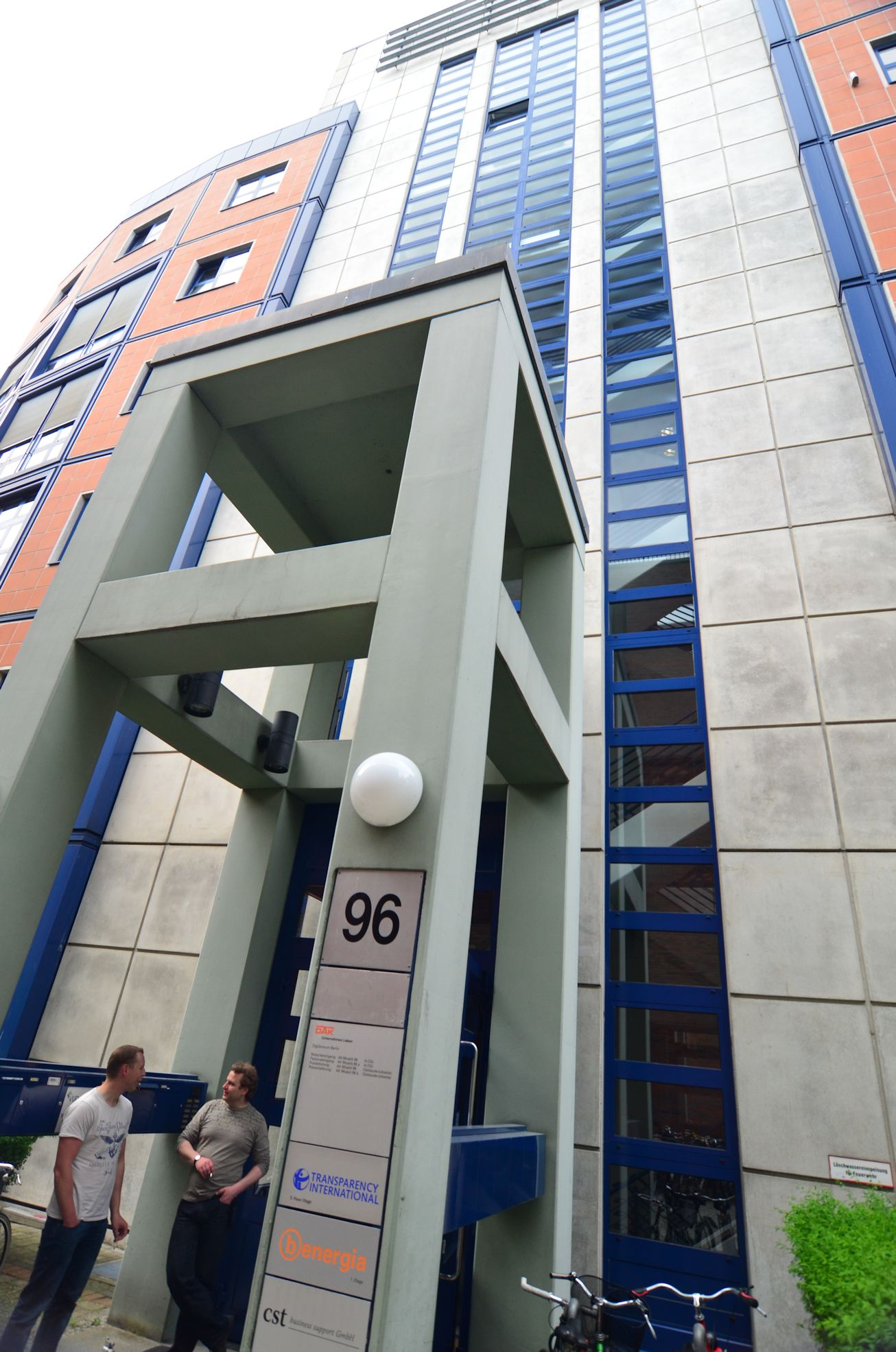
Transparency International's headquarters in Moabit, Berlin

The Secretariat based in Berlin is responsible for global operations whereas chapters are autonomous and responsible for work in their own respective countries. Maíra Martini took office as CEO of the Secretariat on 1 February 2025. She previously held the position of Head of Policy and Advocacy at the Secretariat. The Movement is officially led by the annual membership meeting of all the chapters. Between membership meetings, the TI Board of Directors lead the Movement, but delegate aspects to the CEO. TI's leadership structure includes an International Council, a group of individuals with extensive experience in TI's work. Drawn from diverse geographical, cultural and professional backgrounds, council members are appointed by the TI board of directors to advise them and to support the work of the organization as a whole.

=== Chapters ===
When an organisation passes the "accreditation process", if it passes all stages, it will ultimately become a chapter. There are just over 100 chapters worldwide. Chapters go through re-accreditation every three years. If they fail, they risk disaccreditation which removes them from the Movement. Chapters include:

- Transparency International Bangladesh, the chapter with the largest number of members
- Transparency International Canada
- Transparency Serbia
- Transparency International Slovakia

Not all chapters choose to adopt the TI name when they get selected to join the movement. Examples include the Association for a More Just Society, the TI chapter for Honduras, and Corruption Watch, the TI chapter for South Africa.

In April 2015 Russia's Ministry of Justice added TI Russia to its list of foreign agents. On 6 March 2023, TI was declared an undesirable organization in Russia.

=== Disaccreditations ===
==== TI Croatia ====
Due to a "lack of confidence", TI's chapter in Croatia was disaccredited by the organization's board of directors in November 2015. The previous year, several leaders of the Croatia chapter challenged the legality of the chapter president's election. The president was accused of falsifying records, conflicts of interest, and arbitrarily expelling 10 chapter members who opposed the hiring of staff against the organization's rules. The Croatian government eventually revoked the president's appointment.

==== TI USA ====
In January 2017, the TI Secretariat confirmed that its International Board of Directors decided on 10 January 2017 to strip its US affiliate – Transparency International USA – of its accreditation as the national chapter in the US. The stated basis for the dis-accreditation was the board's recognition of differences in philosophies, strategies, and priorities between the former chapter and the TI Movement. Elsewhere, it was reported that TI-USA came to be seen in the US as a corporate front group, funded by multinational corporations. TI-USA's funding was provided by Bechtel Corporation, Deloitte, Google, Pfizer ($50,000 or more), Citigroup, ExxonMobil, Fluor, General Electric, Lockheed Martin, Marsh McLennan, PepsiCo, PricewaterhouseCoopers, Raytheon, Realogy, Tyco ($25,000–$49,999), and Freeport-McMoRan and Johnson & Johnson (up to $24,999). TI-USA previously awarded an annual corporate leadership award to one of its big corporate funders. In 2016, this award went to Bechtel. In April 2015 the Secretariat defended the decision by TI-USA to give Hillary Clinton its Integrity Award in 2012.

A new TI USA chapter was created on January 1, 2020.

== Funding ==
According to their donation policy, TI receives funding from a range of donors, including government agencies, multilateral institutions, foundations, the private sector and individuals. Funding may be unrestricted or tied to specific projects or programmes. It is their policy to accept funding – whether monetary or in kind – from any donor, provided that acceptance does not impair the independence to pursue their mission or endanger the integrity and reputation. The funding sources vary between chapters and the Secretariat. Some chapters rely heavily on financial support from small private donations. The Secretariat and chapters have independent fundraising efforts and the intention is for chapters not to be financially dependent on the Secretariat.

=== Siemens Integrity Initiative ===
In January 2015 it was reported that TI accepted $3 million from a foundation set up by the German engineering multinational Siemens. Siemens had established the foundation subsequent to paying one of the largest corporate corruption fines in 2008 in history – $1.6 billion – for bribing government officials in numerous countries. In 2014, the Siemens Integrity Initiative funded a project at TI after pleading guilty in 2008 to bribery charges relating to widespread corrupt practices in Greece, Norway, Iraq, Vietnam, Italy, Israel, Argentina, Venezuela, China and Russia. TI applied for and received the project funding from the Siemens Integrity Initiative. At the time, this was controversial as TI's due diligence procedures prohibit the organization from accepting money from corporations that want to "greenwash" their reputations by making donations to TI. "If any corporate donor is accused of having been involved in corruption, the donor can expect no protection from TI," the procedures state. Transparency International received the funding from the Siemens Integrity Initiative about a year after the Siemens foundation hired a TI staff member from their EU office. This raised media questions of a revolving door that could benefit both the organization and the company. According to Corporate Crime Reporter which reported extensively on the case, several of TI's national chapters also have accepted money from the Siemens Integrity Initiative: $660,000 for TI USA, $600,000 for TI Italy, $450,000 for TI Bulgaria, and $230,000 for TI Mexico – each for a period of three years. TI's then managing director, Cobus de Swardt, said, "We did not file an application to Siemens, we applied to the Siemens Integrity Initiative. There's a difference." The project funded by the Siemens Integrity Initiative over multiple years was called "Integrity Pact" and was deemed a significant success upon its completion. It focused on building national capacities to strengthen government procurement practices across multiple countries to prevent the kind of corruption that Siemens had engaged in. The model applied is now a format for government procurement worldwide. Transparency International argues that the seed funding from the Siemens Integrity Initiative has had significant positive impact in ensuring transparency in government procurement around there world and thereby limiting corruption risk.

== Criticisms ==
=== 2013 stance on Edward Snowden ===
At its annual members' meeting in November 2013 in Berlin, TI's national chapters from Germany and Ireland proposed a resolution calling for the "end of the prosecution of Edward J. Snowden ... He should be recognized as a whistleblower for his help to reveal the over-reaching and unlawful surveillance by secret services ... He symbolizes the courage of numerous other whistleblowers around the world." The final resolution that was passed by the plenary excluded any reference to Snowden, and excluded a call for "comprehensive protection on whistleblowers from all forms of retaliation". The original resolution was weakened following the intervention of the TI USA. Five months earlier, in June 2013, representatives from TI met Snowden at the Moscow airport, where he asked for political asylum in Russia.

=== 2015 whistleblowing ===
In August 2015 former TI staffer Anna Buzzoni went public regarding retaliation she and her colleagues faced after reporting to managers questionable financial dealings at TI's Water Integrity Network. Two of Buzzoni's project responsibilities were suspended and she was transferred against her will. She left TI shortly before internal whistleblower guidelines were adopted in June 2014.

=== 2017–21 reports of toxic culture at the Berlin Secretaratiat ===
In 2017, Cobus de Swardt stood down as TI's managing director, following a dispute with the organization's board of directors. De Swardt agreed a settlement with TI in a Labour Court in Berlin. In August 2019, accounts from seven current and former TI Secretariat staff were reported in The Guardian alleging a "toxic workplace" culture at the organization. In 2021, de Swardt published a book accusing TI of abuse of power and of silencing him as a whistleblower in his former role as executive director. De Swardt also presented a video published on YouTube by his publisher, Springer, criticising TI.

De Swardt's successor, Patricia Moreira, left in 2020 after making similar accusations to those of De Swardt, accusing the Board of failing to protect her as a whistleblower. The German newspaper Frankfurter Allgemeine Zeitung reported that TI dismissed Moreira "without giving any reasons". The article added that, "dozens of employees, including high-ranking ones, have left the organization in recent years. Even long-standing and deeply committed employees complain that TI is involved in political intrigues in which some are only interested in their own progress." An investigator contracted by Moreira stated in a report that TI board's handling of the complaints process was beset by conflicts of interest and failed to address allegations of misconduct made against the board by Moreira.

Following the departure of Moreira, Daniel P. Eriksson was appointed interim managing director in March 2020, and became CEO a year later. During his term leading up to January 2025, the organization culture and work environment improved significantly.

=== 2020-2024 TI Brazil accusations ===
Some sources have questioned the political impartiality and transparency of TI Brazil, based on conversations of prosecutors in Operation Car Wash, leaked to The Intercept following a hack. Members in the chat group included chief prosecutor Deltan Dallagnol as well as the head of TI Brazil. The chat group included posts on a "backstage campaign" to "disarm resistance on the left", fund selected candidates, and target others, seen as adversaries, using social media. Plans extended to preparing a series of false accusations ("denúncias sem materialidade") intended to damage the reputation of former president and potential candidate Luiz Inácio Lula da Silva, and led up to a chat in which participants celebrated the election of Jair Bolsonaro. In April 2022, the Tribunal de Contas da União announced that it had opened an investigation against TI in relation to the imprisonment of Lula da Silva.

In July 2025, the TCU unanimously decided to close the investigation. On February 5, 2024, Supreme Court minister Dias Toffoli opened an investigation into TI Brazil for allegedly having received funds from the leniency agreement with the J&F group. On October 16, 2024, Prosecutor General of the Republic, Paulo Gonet, requested the closure of the investigation, citing a lack of proper evidence, and on March 12, 2026, Toffoli closed the investigation.

== See also ==
- European Public Prosecutor's Office
- Group of States against Corruption
- Information commissioner
- International Anti-Corruption Academy
- ISO 37001 Anti-bribery management systems
- United Nations Convention Against Corruption
- Freedom of information
- Transparency (market)
- Transparency (trade)
