= Cobus de Swardt =

South African sociologist

Cobus de Swardt is a South African sociologist. He was head of Transparency International from 2007 to 2017, and is a former chair of the World Economic Forum (WEF) Global Agenda Council on Corruption.

== Education ==
De Swardt earned an MPhil in Political and African Studies from the University of Cape Town, and a PhD in sociology from La Trobe University, Melbourne.

== Career ==
In the 1980s and early 1990s, he was active in the anti-apartheid struggle in South Africa, chairing the African National Congress in Cape Town. He has taught at universities in Australia, Germany, Japan and South Africa. He worked in various countries for multinational corporations, trade unions and research institutes in managerial and research capacities. He also served as a Director of United Nations Global Compact.

De Swardt led the Chronic Poverty Research Centre, an international research and development policy network, in South Africa, and represented it internationally. He served as Global Programmes Director for Transparency International from 2004 and became Acting Managing Director on 30 April 2007. He was head of Transparency International from 2007 to 2017, when he was succeeded by Patricia Moreira.

The departure of de Swardt from Transparency International was contentious and led to a settlement agreement between Transparency International and de Swardt in a Labour Court in Berlin. In 2021, de Swardt's book, Silencing a Whistleblower, was published, accusing Transparency International of abuse of power.

He was a member and former chair of the World Economic Forum (WEF) Global Agenda Council on Corruption. In addition, he served on the Board of the WEF Partnering against Corruption Initiative (PACI) and the Berlin Civil Society Centre. He wrote several articles for the WEF on corruption, including topics such as why businesses should be more open and how to end poverty.
