= Maguen David Synagogue =

Conservative synagogue in San Pedro Sula, Honduras

- Hebrew: בית הכנסת מגן דוד; Spanish: Sinagoga Maguen David
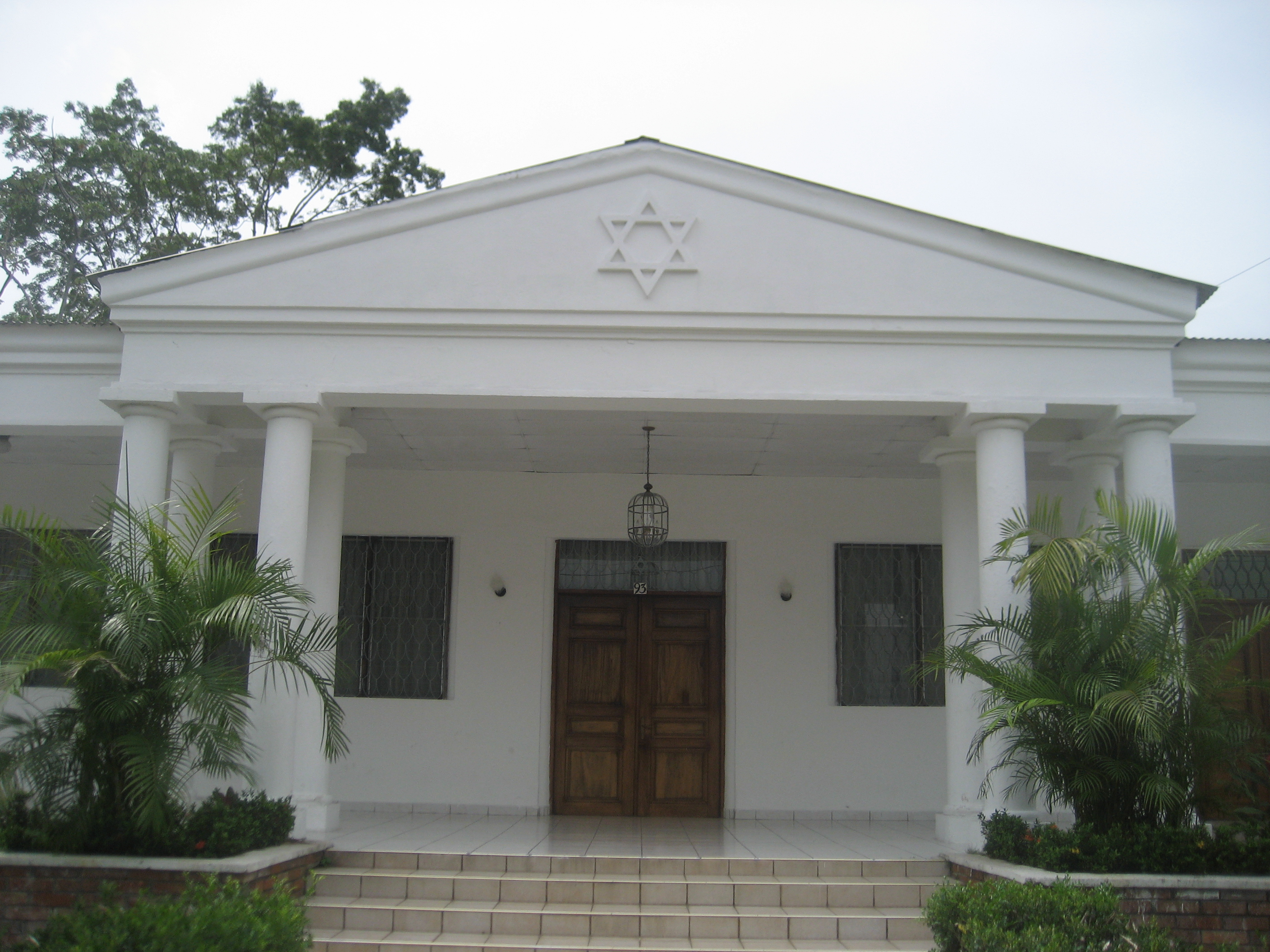
- The synagogue façade, in 2009

- Location of the synagogue in Honduras

Religion
- Affiliation: Conservative Judaism
- Rite: Nusach Sefard
- Ecclesiastical or organizational status: Synagogue
- Status: Active

Location
- Location: Blvd Morazán, 2 Calle SO, 15 Avenida SO, Barrio Supaya, San Pedro Sula, Cortés
- Country: Honduras
- Interactive map of Maguen David Synagogue
- Coordinates: 15°30′23″N 88°02′08″W

Architecture
- Completed: 1997

The Maguen David Synagogue (Hebrew: בית הכנסת מגן דוד; Spanish: Sinagoga Maguen David) is a Conservative Jewish congregation and synagogue, located in San Pedro Sula, in the Cortés department of Honduras. The synagogue was completed in 1997 and it serves as the central gathering place of the small Jewish community.

The Honduran Jewish community is served by three synagogues. In addition to the Conservative Maguen David Synagogue, there is an Orthodox synagogue in San Pedro Sula, called Derech Chaim Synagogue, also called Mishkan Shlomo Synagogue. In Tegucigalpa, the only synagogue is the Shevit Ajim Synagogue.

== See also ==
- History of the Jews in Honduras
- List of synagogues in Honduras
