= Banco de Occidente (Honduras) =

Bank of Honduras

Banco de Occidente SA
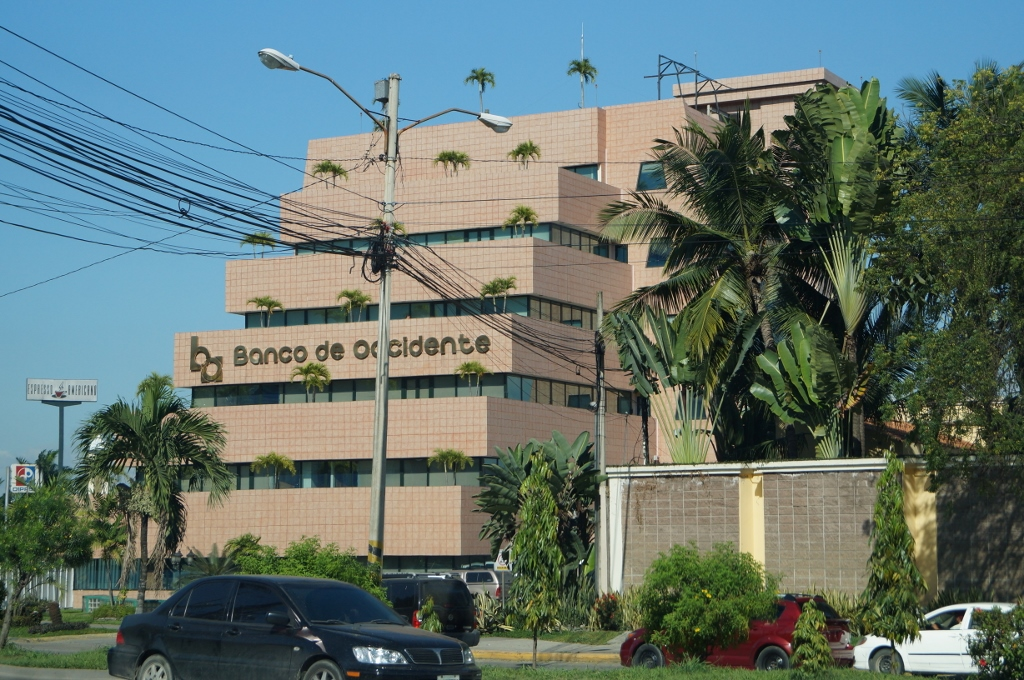
- A branch of Banco Occidental in San Pedro Sula.
- Type: Sociedad Anonima
- Industry: Financial services
- Founded: September 1, 1951; 75 years ago
- Headquarters: Santa Rosa de Copan, Honduras
- Area served: Honduras
- Products: Banking
- Website: www.bancocci.hn

Banco de Occidente is one of the commercial banks in Honduras. It is headquartered in Santa Rosa de Copan with 170 branches nationwide.

== History ==
The bank was founded on September 1, 1951, in the city of Santa Rosa de Copan, by Manuel Bueso Pineda and Jorge Bueso Arias and previously authorized by the Executive Branch of Honduras on 30 August 1951 by resolution No. 500 of the Secretariat of Finance and Public Credit. The bank began operations with an initial capital of 100 thousand lempiras divided into a thousand shares worth one hundred lempiras each, besides incorporating deposits and the Bueso House loan portfolio, which had been functioning as a bank for a long time.

In 1970 the bank began to expand, founded an agency in the city of San Pedro Sula, and in 1975 opened the first in the capital Tegucigalpa.
