= Grupo Continental (Honduras) =

Honduran conglomerate

Grupo Continental is a Honduran conglomeration of businesses founded in 1929 and owned by the Rosenthal family, headed by Jaime Rosenthal. In October 2015 the Grupo was accused of supporting drug trafficking and money laundering.

It consists of more than 50 businesses employing more than 25,000 people.

- A Bank (Banco Continental)
- Seguros Continental, an Insurance Company
- A Civil Engineering Contractor (Con-Delta)
- Editorial Honduras, who run El Tiempo
- Canal 11, a broadcast TV network
- Cablecolor, a cable TV network
- A Cement Company (Cementos del Norte)
- A crocodile meat and skin export company (Cocodrilos Continental)
- A Coffee Export and Cropping Company (Cafe Continental)
- A Processing Free trade zone (ZIP Continental)
- Empacadora Continental, a meatpacking plant
- Compañía Azucarera Chumbagua, una compañía Azucarera
- A Sugar Cane plantation, mill and refinery (Compañía Azucarera Chumbagua) Note: Compañía Azucarera Chumbagua does not belong to Grupo Continental.
- A Large Percentage in the third largest Honduran Bank (Banco de Occidente)
- Residential Zones in Many cities of Honduras- (Residencial Kassandras, Residencial Oro Verde, Colonia Universidad, Residencial Los Prado, Llanos De Sula)
- A Banana Company (Bananas Naco)
- Ranches for Cattle and Sheep Breeding- (Ganaderia Quimistan, Corderos Continental)
- A Cacao Farm (Cacao Continental)
