= Association for a More Just Society =

Organization

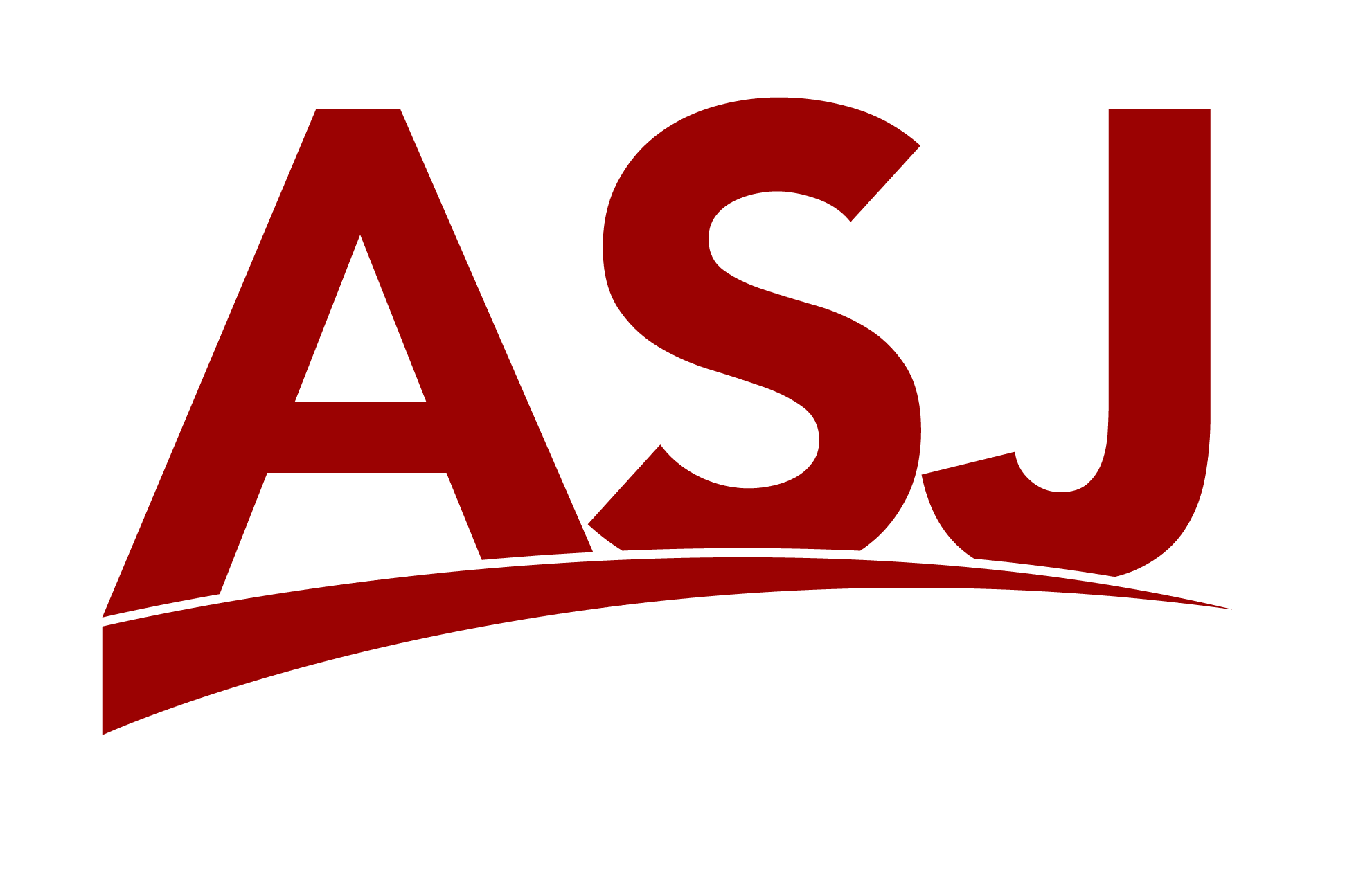
ASJ, or la Asociación para una Sociedad Más Justa (which translates to the Association for a More Just Society in English)

The Association for a More Just Society (ASJ, or La Asociación para una Sociedad más Justa in Spanish) is a non-governmental organization working on human rights and government transparency in Honduras, where it serves as Transparency International's local chapter. Since its founding in Honduras in 1998, ASJ has promoted peace and justice in Honduras by advocating for government systems that work for the most vulnerable members of society.

ASJ's work is done through three sister organizations, which work together towards justice in Honduras:

- ASJ-Honduras, a Honduran civil society organization working on justice initiatives, human rights, and government transparency in Honduras and serving as Transparency International's local chapter.
- ASJ-US (formerly known as AJS), a 501(c)(3) organization based in the U.S. which supports ASJ's work in Honduras and shares this vision of transformation with people around the world.
- ASJ-Canada, a Canadian organization that supports ASJ's work in Honduras and seeks solidarity with and justice for marginalized communities.

== History ==
ASJ was founded in 1998 in Tegucigalpa, Honduras, by a group of North Americans and Hondurans seeking to address the lack of legal systems protecting the poor in Honduras. The organization began with a focus on land rights and labor rights. ASJ provided legal support to communities facing unjust land seizure and has helped over 70,000 Hondurans receive their land titles.

ASJ also provided legal support to security guards and cleaning workers who were victims of labor rights violations. In December 2006, ASJ lawyer Dionisio Díaz García was murdered for his work representing vulnerable security guards. Although Dionisio's killers were originally convicted, the Honduran Supreme Court overturned the case's original conviction, and the case has been appealed to the Inter-American Commission on Human Rights, where it is awaiting review. The Inter-American Commission on Human Rights asked the government to protect workers of ASJ.

ASJ's homicide investigation program in marginal communities has significantly reduced violence and impunity in some of the poorest neighborhoods in Tegucigalpa and San Pedro Sula. According to a study by the Violence Analysis Laboratory published in 2017, saving on average six lives per month and earning a conviction rate 10 times the national average. ASJ's advocacy for national security reforms has contributed to an overall reduction in homicide rates in Honduras.

ASJ's work has grown to push for reform in key areas like education, health, security reform, transparency, and democratic reforms. ASJ works at the grassroots level, empowering citizens to audit their local institutions, and at the national level, monitoring key government institutions for corruption and advocating for national reforms. ASJ became Transparency International's chapter in Honduras in 2012.

== Let's Transform Honduras ==
In 2009, ASJ became a founding member of civil society coalition Transformemos Honduras (Let's Transform Honduras), which provides social oversight to the public education and health systems. Other members include Doctors Without Borders (Médecins Sans Frontières) and Christian charity organizations World Vision and Compassion International.

By mobilizing parents of students in Honduras' public schools to collect accurate data, Transformemos Honduras exposed that between 2002 and 2012, teachers' strikes and other irregularities meant that students were attending class on average 120 days per year, despite Honduran law requiring 200 days per year. When the reports were published, the Minister of Education was fired, and the new Minister instituted reforms that purged 15,000 "ghost teachers" from the government payroll, teachers who were being paid, but not showing up to class. Consequently, students met the 200 school days requirement for the next four years.

Transformemos Honduras also exposed corruption in government medicine purchasing and warehousing. A report published in March, 2013 showed that medicines were not only being overvalued, they were being purchased from companies with elite connections—one was owned by the family of the vice-president of the Honduran Congress, a clear conflict of interest. Furthermore, medicine warehousing left sensitive medicines to spoil, threatening the health of thousands of Hondurans. The report led to a raid on the warehouse and an arrest of the warehouse manager, as well as a complete overhaul of medicine purchasing for public hospitals in Honduras. Encouragingly, now some medical purchasing is done in a trust in cooperation with the United Nations Office for Project Services, with Transformemos Honduras performing social oversight.

== Alliance for Peace and Justice ==
ASJ helped found La Alianza por la Paz y la Justicia (APJ, the Alliance for Peace and Justice) in 2012, a civil society coalition that advocates for reforms in the judicial and security sectors, particularly in regards to corruption in the national and military police. The Alliance for Peace and Justice includes the Catholic and Evangelical churches in Honduras, the National Autonomous University, the Honduran Association for nongovernmental associations, and various national and international organizations including World Vision.

APJ works in seven regional chapters both training individuals to navigate the justice system and advocating for reforms to make the justice system easier to navigate. The Alliance is a strong coalition of civil society organizations in Honduras and frequently speaks on issues of corruption and violence. APJ has published the first studies on Honduras's high impunity rate, which was 86% in 2019.

== Transparency International agreement ==
In 2014, Honduran president Juan Orlando Hernández signed a collaboration agreement with ASJ and Transparency International (TI) allowing them access to information on government purchasing and contracts, human resources, and data collection so that the organizations could perform social oversight. The first of the reports on six major government sectors were presented in November, 2015 exposing misallocation of funds and corrupt hiring practices. ASJ went on publish its findings, as well as detailed recommendations for improvement, on government ministries like the Ministry of Education, Health, Security In response, the government ministers proposed several reforms, which ASJ and TI continued to monitor. After five years of evaluations, institutional transparency scores improved on average by 26%. According to researcher Daniel Sabet, "the work ASJ is doing is an innovative example of social auditing to increase accountability".

== Police Purge commission ==
In April 2016, Honduran president Juan Orlando Hernández appointed two ASJ leaders to be part of the Special Commission for the Purging and Transformation of the National Police. This commission was named as a result of the rampant corruption in the Honduran police force. The commission removed 5,600 corrupt and unqualified officers while also hiring 9,800 newly trained officers. The Police Purge came to be seen as beyond comparison in Latin America, having successfully implemented reforms that many thought were impossible.

== COVID-19 ==
In March 2020, ASJ was asked to audit $80 million worth of government purchases for emergency medical equipment including ventilators and test-kits. ASJ's investigation found that the Honduran government failed to purchase the right lab equipment to use test kits, had no plan to distribute the ventilators it purchased, and wasted $12 million on subpar, late-arriving mobile hospitals. As a result, Marco Bográn (director of INVEST-H, the government institution in charge of COVID-19 purchasing) was arrested on charges of misappropriating public funds. ASJ is also monitoring the delivery of COVID-19 vaccines to Honduras.

== Awards ==
- Revistazo journalist Dina Meza received an Amnesty International award on 4 July 2007.
- Revistazo journalist German Reyes received a national journalism award in Honduras in 2017 for the documentary "A Crime in the Shadows of Religion".
- In 2019, ASJ was selected as a finalist in the World Justice Challenge and at the Paris Peace Forum.
