= Cachiros =

Honduran drug cartel

- Founded: 1990s
- Founding location: Colón, Honduras
- Years active: 1990s-present
- Territory: Honduras, Nicaragua
- Ethnicity: Hondurans
- Leaders: Javier Eriberto Rivera Maradiaga; Devis Leonel Rivera Maradiaga; Ariel Feliciano Rivera Maradiaga
- Activities: Bribery; Drug trafficking; Money laundering
- Allies: Los Rastrojos; Norte del Valle Cartel (defunct); Sinaloa Cartel

Cachiros or Los Cachiros is the name of a Honduran criminal organization dedicated to drug trafficking. It was founded in the early 1990s by a group of cattle farmers in the departments of Colón and Olancho de Honduras.

One of the leaders of the Cachiros, Javier Maradiaga, also known as "Javier Cachiro", surrendered to the US government in January 2015. During the trial, Maradiaga pleaded guilty to the charge of drug trafficking.

After Maradiaga's statement, Honduran authorities seized goods valued between 500 and 800 million dollars. The net worth of the Cachiros is valued at more than one billion dollars.

In March 2017, Devis Leonel Rivera Maradiaga testified at the trial of Fabio Porfirio Lobo in the United States District Court, Southern District of New York. Rivera Maradiaga declared that during the period from 2009 to 2013, the Honduran government assisted him in his drug trafficking operations by providing police intelligence, radar information, and assignment of military personnel to provide security.

Rivera Maradiaga also said his organization paid bribes to prominent members of the Honduran government including former president Porfirio Lobo Sosa. The bribes were made in order to receive support to their operations and be granted contracts to companies owned by the Cachiros.

Devis Leonel Rivera Maradiaga not only testified but also provided evidence in the form of voice recordings, videos, and photographs.
