= Jaime Rosenthal =

Honduran politician (1936–2019)

Member of National Congress of Honduras
- In office January 2002 – January 2006

Third Vice President of Honduras
- In office January 1986 – 1989
- President: José Azcona del Hoyo

Personal details
- Born: Jaime Rolando Rosenthal Oliva; May 5, 1936 San Pedro Sula, Honduras
- Died: January 12, 2019 (aged 82) San Pedro Sula, Honduras
- Party: Liberal Party of Honduras
- Education: MIT Sloan School of Management; Massachusetts Institute of Technology
- Occupation: Politician

Jaime Rolando Rosenthal Oliva (May 5, 1936 – January 12, 2019) was a Honduran politician, and leader of one of Liberal Party of Honduras's (PLH) wings, and was a perennial candidate for President. On March 20, 1974, he founded the Banco Continental.

On October 7, 2015, Rosenthal was labeled a "specially designated narcotics trafficker" under the Foreign Narcotics Kingpin Designation Act.

== Biography ==
His Romanian Jewish father, Yankel Rosenthal, emigrated from Romania to Honduras in 1929. His father married Esther Oliva from El Salvador. Rosenthal held a BS degree in Civil Engineering from the Massachusetts Institute of Technology and an MS degree from the MIT Sloan School of Management. He was one of the Vice Presidents (known as Designados Presidenciales) during the presidency of José Azcona del Hoyo (January 1986-January 1990) and resigned because of political differences. He was also a Congressman in Honduras, (January 2002 to January 2006). A 2006 study by the Friedrich Ebert Foundation named Rosenthal one of "the most powerful men in Honduras" (along with Fredy Nasser and Schucry Kafie).

Rosenthal died following a heart attack on January 12, 2019. He was 82 years old. He was the father of Yani Rosenthal, who was a minister from 2006 to 2009 under Manuel Zelaya. His nephew, Yankel Rosenthal, is a former minister under President Juan Orlando Hernández.

== Legal Issues and Political Indictment ==
On October 7, 2015, Rosenthal was labeled a "specially designated narcotics trafficker" under the Foreign Narcotics Kingpin Designation Act.

At the time of his death, Rosenthal was under U.S. federal indictment for laundering drug proceedings on behalf of the Cachiros, a major Honduran drug cartel. He, along with his son Yani Rosenthal and nephew Yankel Rosenthal were co-defendants in the case.

In December 2017, Yani Rosenthal pled guilty and was convicted by a U.S. District Court of Money Laundering for the Cachiros. He was sentenced to 36 months in prison.

== Grupo Continental ==
Banco Continental was founded in 1974 and until its closure in late 2015 was the eighth largest bank in Honduras, forming part of Grupo Continental, itself founded in 1929 and owned by the Rosenthal family.
