= Banco Continental (Honduras) =

Bank of Honduras

- Founded: March 20, 1974 in San Pedro Sula, Honduras
- Founder: Jaime Rosenthal
- Defunct: October 12, 2015
- Headquarters: Honduras
- Area served: Honduras
- Key people: Jaime Rosenthal
- Products: Banking
- Services: Banking
- Owner: Grupo Continental
- Website: http://www2.bancon.hn/

Banco Continental was a bank in Honduras founded by Jaime Rosenthal on March 20, 1974, and aimed at commercial and agro-industrial banking, including coffee producers. On October 7, 2015, the United States Department of Justice released a statement saying that Rosenthal, his son Yani Rosenthal and nephew Yankel Rosenthal, as well as seven businesses, were labeled "specially designated narcotics traffickers" under the Foreign Narcotics Kingpin Designation Act. This was the first time the designation had been applied against a bank outside the United States. As a result, the official Comisión Nacional de Banca y Seguros (CNBS) forcibly liquidated the bank, which remained closed as of Monday, October 12, 2015.
