= Polache =

Honduran musician and soccer player (born 1977)

- Origin: Honduras
- Years active: 2008–present
- Website: http://www.polache.com

Polache (born Paul Robert Douglas Hughes- Hallett Ramos; February 10, 1977, in Tegucigalpa, Honduras) is a Honduran musician and soccer player. He has released four albums in the country and represented Honduras in the 2014 Viña del Mar International Song Festival. Polache cares about being authentic with melodies that reflect the daily life of Honduras. He likes to write about love, peace, war, football, corruption, women and he tries to highlight the Honduran culture in his songs.

He played soccer for Deportes Savio in the Liga Nacional de Ascenso de Honduras and wrote a song dedicated to the team. He also wrote a song for the Honduras national soccer team for the 2014 World Cup.

He was briefly banned in the country following the 2009 Honduran coup d'état for performing with Manuel Zelaya, who was later overthrown.

== Personal life ==
Polache, whose father is British and mother is Honduran, goes by the Spanish pronunciation of his name, "Paul H." (Pol-ache). His first studies were at the Instituto Salesiano San Miguel, he also obtained his bachelor's degree in Sciences and Letters at the Instituto San Francisco de Tegucigalpa. Since he was little he was a member of the scouts until he turned 19 and entered the Technological University of Honduras where he studied Advertising and Communications.

He was deported from the United States in 2012 for attempting to work with a tourist visa. Polache gained fame in 2008 in Honduras by releasing his first song "Mira Honduras" where he sought to give importance to national identity. Likewise, with the support of the media and the Hondurans themselves, he released the song "Hablo Español" and "Pedazo de Mujer" which made him one of the most sought-after artists throughout the Honduran nation.

From a very young age he made his artistic gifts known. At the age of 9 he played his first guitar which he called La Polacha, which is the one that has accompanied him on every trip he makes. He made his debut as a musician and singer with the song Mira Honduras. In October 2008, Paul released his first album Habló Español, which is a tribute to Honduran slang. Shortly after, Polache released his second album Celebremos, with which he was able to tour in different countries such as the United States, Spain, Uruguay, Italy and France. He has participated in festivals where he always identifies himself as a 100% Honduran character and tries to highlight his country at all times.
