= Javier Abril Espinoza =

Honduran writer based in Switzerland

- Born: 1967 (age 58–59); Honduras
- Occupations: Writer, poet, playwright, screenwriter
- Notable work: De aquí en adelante…; Un ángel atrapado en el huracán
- Awards: Pablo Neruda Prize (1996); Mari Paz Ovidi International Short Story Prize (2005)

Javier Abril Espinoza (born 1967) is a Honduran writer based in Switzerland. He writes for the newspaper The Herald of Honduras and collaborates with various literary magazines from Latin America.

In 1996, he won the Pablo Neruda Prize for his poetry collection De aquí en adelante... [from now on...] (1996 - UPNH), and the Mari Paz Ovidi Premio Internacional de Cuentos [Mari Paz Ovidi International Short Story Prize], organized by the Australian publishing house Terra Austral, in 2005.

He wrote Un ángel atrapado en el huracán, a story book that deals with the natural disasters caused by hurricanes in Central America and the Caribbean.

As well as producing novels and short stories, Abril Espinoza is also a playwright and scriptwriter. Several of his literary works and essays have been translated into some of the official languages of the European Union.

== Bibliography ==
- Un ángel atrapado en el huracán [an angel trapped in the hurricane]: Editorial Tropicornio de Centroamérica, 2002. ISBN 99926-30-54-X
- Cuentos para niños y niñas [stories for little boys and little girls] (Children's Stories Collection - UNICEF)
- El doblez de los espejos [the fold in the mirrors] (poetry)
