= Water crisis in Honduras =

Water scarcity and pollution in Honduras

The water crisis in Honduras is the problem of physical and economic water scarcity in Honduras.

== Demographics ==
As of 2010, Honduras is a country that has a population of around 7.6 million people, of which about more than 50% live in the rural areas.

== Description ==
The Guacirope River Basin is in the South of Honduras. It is an area that faces extreme drought due to high temperatures and low annual rainfall. This is a deviation from coastal regions of Honduras that enjoys high annual rainfall and relatively cool temperatures.

== Problem ==
Water coverage in Honduras has is about 80% of its total population and about 70% in rural areas. The current level of water sanitation and its quantity is insufficient where close to 90% of the water supply is intermittent and unreliable. In the rural areas, 44% of the water is up to health standards due to absence of water quality control and monitoring. Sanitation coverage in Honduras is improving, reaching 68% of the total population but only 50% of the rural populace

In addition, this area suffers from extensive deforestation, which reduces the soil's water retention rate which in turn leads to poor returns on crop cultivation, health issues and poverty. The lack of infrastructure and resources to collect rainwater in the Guacirope River basin exacerbates this problem.

== Current situation ==
In 1998, Honduras was hit by Hurricane Mitch which left 75% of the country without safe drinking water, and the country has not yet recovered from the damage to the infrastructure it has caused. Currently, infrastructure and basic healthcare is lacking and repair works are still ongoing. Today, 1.2 million people in Honduras have no access to improved water sources. A military coup in 2009 has led to political and economical turmoil, further worsening the water situation in the country. Coupled with the lack of infrastructure, the health standards in Honduras are dire.

A severe lack of water has led to much hardship amongst the locals, especially in the rural areas. Diarrhea and hepatitis are some of the illnesses which are rampant, especially among the young which can be fatal in some cases.

In the rural villages, women spend up to 6 man-hours to fetch clean water which could otherwise be used for educational and developmental purposes. Lack of access to clean water contributes largely to the poverty and poor health of the Hondurans. Despite the graveness of the crisis, the government is unable to implement useful programs to ease the destitution in the country, especially those living in the rural areas.

== One Drop NGO ==
=== Introduction ===
One Drop Foundation is a non-governmental organisation (NGO) that aims to fight poverty by providing access to water to those in need. Another goal of said NGO is to raise awareness about the water crisis to communicate the need for mobilization in order to ensure that all individuals have access to sufficient amount of safe water in both the present and future. To achieve these, One Drop is actively involved in fundraising through events such as LA SOIRÉE ONE DROP and making use of popular media platform like Facebook, Twitter, YouTube and Flickr. One Drop is currently undertaking nine projects in both developed and developing countries.

=== History ===
One Drop Foundation was founded by Guy Laliberté on October 29, 2007, in Montreal, Quebec, Canada.

One Drop has projects in Nicaragua and Honduras.

Currently, One Drop is assessing the situation in India, Haiti and El Salvador.

=== Approach ===
One Drop utilises a trident approach – Technical, Microfinance, Social Arts and Popular Education.

The Technical approach targets to improve access to water and promote responsible use of this resource.

The Microfinancial approach entails granting loans to communities in order to launch income-generating initiatives and ensure the longevity of projects.

The Social Arts and Population Approach aims to raise awareness, educate and mobilize communities on water-related issues so as to promote the sound management of water, One Drop makes use of social arts and popular education.

=== Mission and values ===
One Drop is guided by its objectives to improve access to safe water in order to increase the level of health and agricultural output, establishing a high standard of food security, improving household incomes, increasing awareness with regards to water-related issues through educational shows and workshops, promoting gender equality and to embody leadership skills in youth so that they can lead the change.

One Drop's website provides information on its activities and acts as a platform for future partners and donations. The website also has a news section that features activities and functions the NGO engages in. It features live photos, listings on the duration of their projects, tasks of representatives, and the impact of the organization's initiatives.

=== One Drop in developing countries ===
==== Honduras ====
Guacirope River Basin is an area stretched by extreme drought due to high temperatures and low annual precipitation. The mountain areas of Guacirope River Basin, faces extensive deforestation diminishing the soil's capacity to retain water. This results in low agricultural yields, poor health, poverty and susceptible to the immense weather. The venue is also undernourished in resources, materials and infrastructures needed to collect rainwater. The Honduras project which is currently ongoing, will directly impacts 1,000 families and will ultimately benefit over 15,000 men, women and children.

===== Progress report =====
Technical and Material Contributions

Energy-efficient stoves: 1,082/1,350

Family gardens: 1,350/1,350

Potable water filters: 1,350/1,350

School gardens: 19/19

Refurbished latrines: 314/400

Water cisterns: 1,350/1,350

Fruit and forest trees : 16,023/13,000

Social Arts and Popular Education

Educational and artistic workshops: 80/80

Multidisciplinary touring shows: 85/85

Microfinance

Following the military coup that took place in June 2009, ONE DROP has decided to reallocate its microfinance fund to activities that will help even more families obtain access to water.

== See also ==
- Water resources management in Honduras
- Water supply and sanitation in Honduras
