= Telephone numbers in Honduras =

- Location of Honduras
- Country: Honduras
- Continent: Central America
- Regulator: Comisión Nacional de Telecomunicaciones (Conatel)
- Numbering plan type: Closed
- NSN length: 8
- Format: XXXX-XXXX
- Numbering plan: Comision Nacional de Telecomunicaciones
- Country code: 504
- International access: 00

Telephone numbers in Honduras are regulated by The Comisión Nacional de Telecomunicaciones (Conatel), the regulatory authority for telecommunications in Honduras.

Country Code: +504
International Call Prefix: 00

National Significant Numbers (NSN): eight digits.

Format: +504 2ABC XXXX (fixed lines)
or +504 YABC XXXX for Y = 3,7,8,9 (mobile)

== Number plan ==
In 2010, fixed telephone numbers in Honduras increased from seven to eight digits by adding the digit 2 at the beginning of all fixed-line numbers.

List of fixed line allocations
Exchange	Destination	Old numbers	New numbers
Polo Paz	Polo	200 XXXX	2200 XXXX
Polo Paz	Polo	201 XXXX	2201 XXXX
Res. Centro América	Resca	209 XXXX	2209 XXXX
El Picacho	Picac	211 XXXX	2211 XXXX
Rdsi Tegucigalpa ( Pri3 )	Pri3	212 XXXX	2212 XXXX
Telef. Inalámbrica Tegucig.	Inateg	213 XXXX	2213 XXXX
Principal 3	Pri3	216 XXXX	2216 XXXX
Principal 3	Pri3	220 XXXX	2220 XXXX
Almendros 2	Alme2	221 XXXX	2221 XXXX
Principal 2	Pri2	222 XXXX	2222 XXXX
Polo Paz	Polo	223 XXXX	2223 XXXX
Cerro Grande	Cerro	224 XXXX	2224 XXXX
La Granja	Lgran	225 XXXX	2225 XXXX
Loarque	Loarq	226 XXXX	2226 XXXX
Res. Centro América	Resca	227 XXXX	2227 XXXX
Kennedy 2 Y 1	Kend2/1	228 XXXX	2228 XXXX
El Ocotal F. M.	Ocotl	229 XXXX	2229 XXXX
Kennedy 2	Kend2	230 XXXX	2230 XXXX
Miraflores 2	Mir2	231 XXXX	2231 XXXX
Principal 3	Pri3	231 XXXX	2231 XXXX
Miraflores 2	Mir2	232 XXXX	2232 XXXX
Toncontín 1	Tonc1	233 XXXX	2233 XXXX
Toncontín 2	Tonc2	234 XXXX	2234 XXXX
Miraflores 2	Mir2	235 XXXX	2235 XXXX
Almendros 1	Alme1	236 XXXX	2236 XXXX
Principal 2	Pri2	237 XXXX	2237 XXXX
Principal 2	Pri2	238 XXXX	2238 XXXX
Miraflores 2	Mir2	239 XXXX	2239 XXXX
Kennedy 1	Kend1d	240 XXXX	2240 XXXX
La Vega 1	Lveg1	245 XXXX	2245 XXXX
La Vega 2	Lveg2	246 XXXX	2246 XXXX
El Hato	Hato	255 XXXX	2255 XXXX
Prados Universitarios	Prauni	257 XXXX	2257 XXXX
Toncontin 2	Tonc2	290 XXXX	2290 XXXX
Toncontin 2	Tonc2	291 XXXX	2291 XXXX
Ceiba 3	Ceib3	423 XXXX	2423 XXXX
Saba	Saba	424 XXXX	2424 XXXX
Utila	Utila	425 XXXX	2425 XXXX
San Alejo / Mesapa	Salej/Mesap	429 XXXX	2429 XXXX
San Francisco Atlantida	Sfratl	431 XXXX	2431 XXXX
Arenal	Arena	433 XXXX	2433 XXXX
Trujillo	Truji	434 XXXX	2434 XXXX
Oakridge	Oakri	435 XXXX	2435 XXXX
La Masica	Masic	436 XXXX	2436 XXXX
Bonito Oriental	Bonor	438 XXXX	2438 XXXX
Centros Comunitarios	Cencc3	439 XXXX	2439 XXXX
La Ceiba 3	Ceib3	440 XXXX	2440 XXXX
La Ceiba Miramar	Ceibm	441 XXXX	2441 XXXX
La Ceiba 2	Ceib2	442 XXXX	2442 XXXX
La Ceiba 2	Ceib2	443 XXXX	2443 XXXX
Tocoa	Tocoa	444 XXXX	2444 XXXX
Coxin Hole	Coxin	445 XXXX	2445 XXXX
Olanchito	Olanc	446 XXXX	2446 XXXX
Tela	Tela	448 XXXX	2448 XXXX
Sonaguera	Sonag	451 XXXX	2451 XXXX
Coyoles Central	Coyol	452 XXXX	2452 XXXX
Guanaja	Guana	453 XXXX	2453 XXXX
French Harbour	French	455 XXXX	2455 XXXX
Inalámbrica Sps	Inasps	543 XXXX	2543 XXXX
Rdsi San Pedro	Sula Rdsi	544 XXXX	2544 XXXX
San Pedro Sula 5	Sps5	545 XXXX	2545 XXXX
San Pedro Sula 5	Sps5	550 XXXX	2550 XXXX
Monte Prieto	Montp	551 XXXX	2551 XXXX
San Pedro Sula 3	Sps3	552 XXXX	2552 XXXX
San Pedro Sula 3	Sps3	553 XXXX	2553 XXXX
Monte Prieto	Montp	554 XXXX	2554 XXXX
Rivera Hernandez	River	555 XXXX	2555 XXXX
La Puerta	Lpuer	556 XXXX	2556 XXXX
San Pedro Sula 4	Sps4	557 XXXX	2557 XXXX
San Pedro Sula 4 Y 5	Sps4/5	558 XXXX	2558 XXXX
Col. Satélite	Sate1	559 XXXX	2559 XXXX
Chamelecón	Chame	565 XXXX	2565 XXXX
Jardines Del Valle	Jardi	566 XXXX	2566 XXXX
Zip Búfalo	Zipbu	574 XXXX	2574 XXXX
C. Comunitarios	Cencs5	640 XXXX	2640 XXXX
C. Comunitarios	Cencs5	641 XXXX	2641 XXXX
C. Comunitarios	Cencs5	642 XXXX	2642 XXXX
Santa Bárbara	Sbarb	643 XXXX	2643 XXXX
Progreso	Progr	647 XXXX	2647 XXXX
Progreso/Santa Cruz	Progr	648 XXXX	2648 XXXX
S. Manuel/ R. Lindo	Smanu	650 XXXX	2650 XXXX
Cucuyagua/Copán	Cucuy	651 XXXX	2651 XXXX
Agua Caliente	Aguac	652 XXXX	2652 XXXX
Nueva Ocotepeque	Nocot	653 XXXX	2653 XXXX
Santa Cruz	Scruz	654 XXXX	2654 XXXX
Lepaera/Corquín		655 XXXX	2655 XXXX

== Changes in 2007 ==
Mobile telephone numbers in Honduras increased from seven (7) to eight (8) digits. The new dialling instructions are as follows:

- Dial 9 + seven-digit number for calls placed to subscribers of Celtel (Tigo)
- Dial 8 + seven-digit number for calls placed to subscribers of Digicel Honduras
- Dial 7 + seven-digit number for calls placed to subscribers of Hondutel
- Dial 3 + seven-digit number for calls placed to subscribers of Sercom (Claro)

Fixed numbers in Honduras remained unchanged at seven digits in length until 2010.

== See also ==
- Telecommunications in Honduras
