= Roberto Quesada =

Carlos Roberto Quesada López, better known as Roberto Quesada, is a contemporary author, journalist, and Honduran ambassador to the United States. He was born in Honduras in 1962 but has lived in New York since 1989.

== Early life ==
La Ceiba, Honduras

Roberto Quesada was born in Olanchito, Honduras, in 1962, but lived the majority of his childhood in La Ceiba, Honduras, a city situated on the north coast of Honduras, with his mother and stepfather, José Adán Castelar, a poet and Honduran writer who was also a medical boss for the Standard Fruit Company. In La Ceiba, he lived surrounded by plantations of pineapple and worked in a pineapple factory for some years in his adolescence. He was drafted into the Honduran Army for seventeen years but was taken from the army as a result of the pressure of his uncle and his mother after some months. He then moved to Tegucigalpa, Honduras after his time in the army to continue studying.

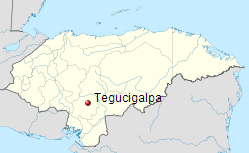
Tegucigalpa, Honduras

In an interview with Edward Waters Hood, Quesada affirms, "... I had the luck to live among books with my stepfather, the poet José Adán Castelar." In the same interview, he mentions that among the books in the library of his stepfather read "...Classical of Russian literature, the French and the Spaniard, and devoted him very little to contemporary literature, even to one of my own country."

== Career ==
=== Writer ===
The author studied at the National Autonomous University of Honduras (NAUH) in Tegucigalpa, Honduras, where he graduated in literature. In New York, Quesada met the author Kurt Vonnegut, who would later become one of his teachers and mentors. The novel Vonnegut's Heaven: Dracula in the AID's Era (2014) by Roberto Quesada tells the story of how the author came to know Vonnegut.

Quesada has written tales, novels, and journalistic essays and has directed literary and cultural magazines. Quesada directed the New York based cultural magazine We the Latins, and is the founder and ex-director of the literary magazine On Flight. His novels The Ships (1992), The Big Banana (1999), and Never Enter Miami (2002) are studied in several North American universities.

==== The Ships (1992) ====
This novel counts the history of the character Guillermo, a boy who lives in La Ceiba, Honduras, who looks for work in a pineapple factory at the Standard Fruit Company while he pursues his aspirations to be a writer. The novel takes place in Honduras at the end of the 1970s after the Nicaraguan revolution, when the presence of the United States began to grow in the country in anticipation of counterrevolutionary movements in Central America such as the Contras, a group of insurgents funded by the United States.

Although the novel presents a political subject, the author signals in an interview with Dr. Edward Waters Hood that "...the writer has to be free under any ideology." With this in mind, the author wrote this book intending to express a universal human element, more specifically of the humanism Dostoevskian, more than one political.

==== The Big Banana (1999) ====
The Big Banana (1999) is one of his more well-known novels that has had great success in the United States. The novel recounts in a humorous way the experiences, and the difficulties of Latin American artists in New York while they try to look for success and attain their dreams. The novel focuses on the perspective of the leading character, Eduardo Lin, a Honduran immigrant in New York who struggles to carry on his dreams of being an actor. The novel also relates the histories, perspectives, fights, motivations, and dreams of the other characters in the novel.

The novel is written from a Latin and immigrant perspective but maintains its classification as a (U.S.) Central American literary work since it shows the perspectives, histories, and social complexities of each character according to their nationality, ethnicity, political affiliation, sexuality, gender, etc. Moreover, the novel relates the difficulties of Central Americans in the United States and the challenges of standing out as a distinct community inside the Latin community.

==== Never Through Miami (2002) ====
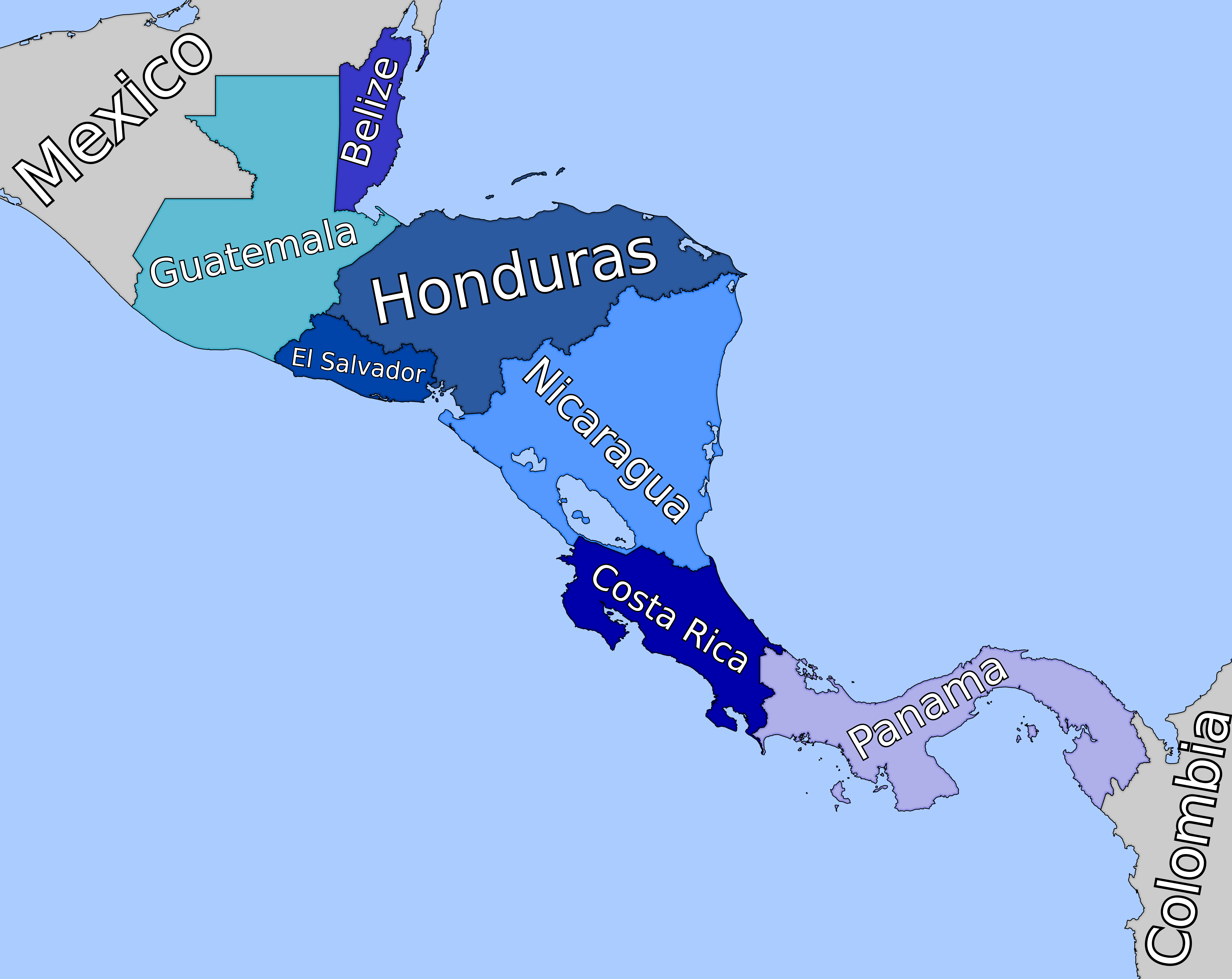
Map of Central America

Never Through Miami (2002) relates the history of the character Elías Sandoval, a Honduran sculptor of Tegucigalpa who emigrated to the United States through the Miami International Airport with the dream of obtaining sufficient money to help his girlfriend, Helena, to emigrate also. When going through customs, he is interrogated due to the fact that his visa is only for six months, but he has not bought a ticket of return to Honduras. Elías eventually travels to New York, where he works as a waiter and makes the money so that his girlfriend can emigrate. However, Elías does not want his girlfriend to visit Miami because of his experiences there, but she does it anyway and ends up falling in love and marrying the customs agent that wouldn't let Elías go into the country.

In an essay that researches the relationship between Big Banana (1999) and Never Enter Miami (2002) in terms of identities of Central Americans of the United States, Dr. Adrian Kane posits that, "Despite the humorous and whimsical plot, Never Through Miami, like Big Banana, makes several serious social commentaries related to the visibility of the Central American diaspora, the challenges that it faces, and the historical reasons for its existence."

Flag of the Organization of American States

=== Politician ===
Quesada is the ambassador and permanent deputy for Honduras in the Organization of American States, a regional agency inside the United Nations that represents the American states.

Before his career in the OEA, he had been the "...Third, Second, and Prime Minister of the Mission of Honduras in front of the United Nations (UN) in New York, with participation in general assemblies, forums, and meetings of commissions of the world-wide organism."

Quesada was appointed as the prime minister secretary of the embassy of Honduras in front of the United Nations on April 22, 2022, by the current president of the Republic of Honduras, Xiomara Castro.

== Personal life ==
Quesada moved to New York in 1989, but initially moved to New Orleans, Louisiana, with his wife, his present ex-wife. After the two divorced, they traveled to New York after being invited to read by Cooper Union, where they knew Kurt Vonnegut and Arturo Arias. They loved the city and its multicultural character and decided to march to New York in search of more opportunities and success in their career. The author resides in New York but visits Honduras regularly since his son lives there.

== Awards ==
Quesada has won two awards. In 1996, he was awarded the prize of the Latin American Institute of Writers in the United States for his novel The Human and the Goddess (1996). In 2009, it was awarded the National Prize of Journalism "Jacobo Cárcamo" by the ex-president of the Republic of Honduras, Manuel Zelaya Rosebushes.

== Selected works ==
=== Storybooks ===
- The Deserter (1985)
- The Reader Who Suddenly Went Blind (1994)
- Vonnegut's Heaven: Dracula in the AID's Era (2014)

=== Novels ===
- The Ships (1992)
- The Human and the Goddess (1996)
- The Big Banana (1999)
- Never Through Miami (2002)

=== Magazines ===
- On Flight (literary magazine)
- We the Latins (New York cultural magazine)
