= Guillermo Anderson =

Honduran musician (1962–2016)

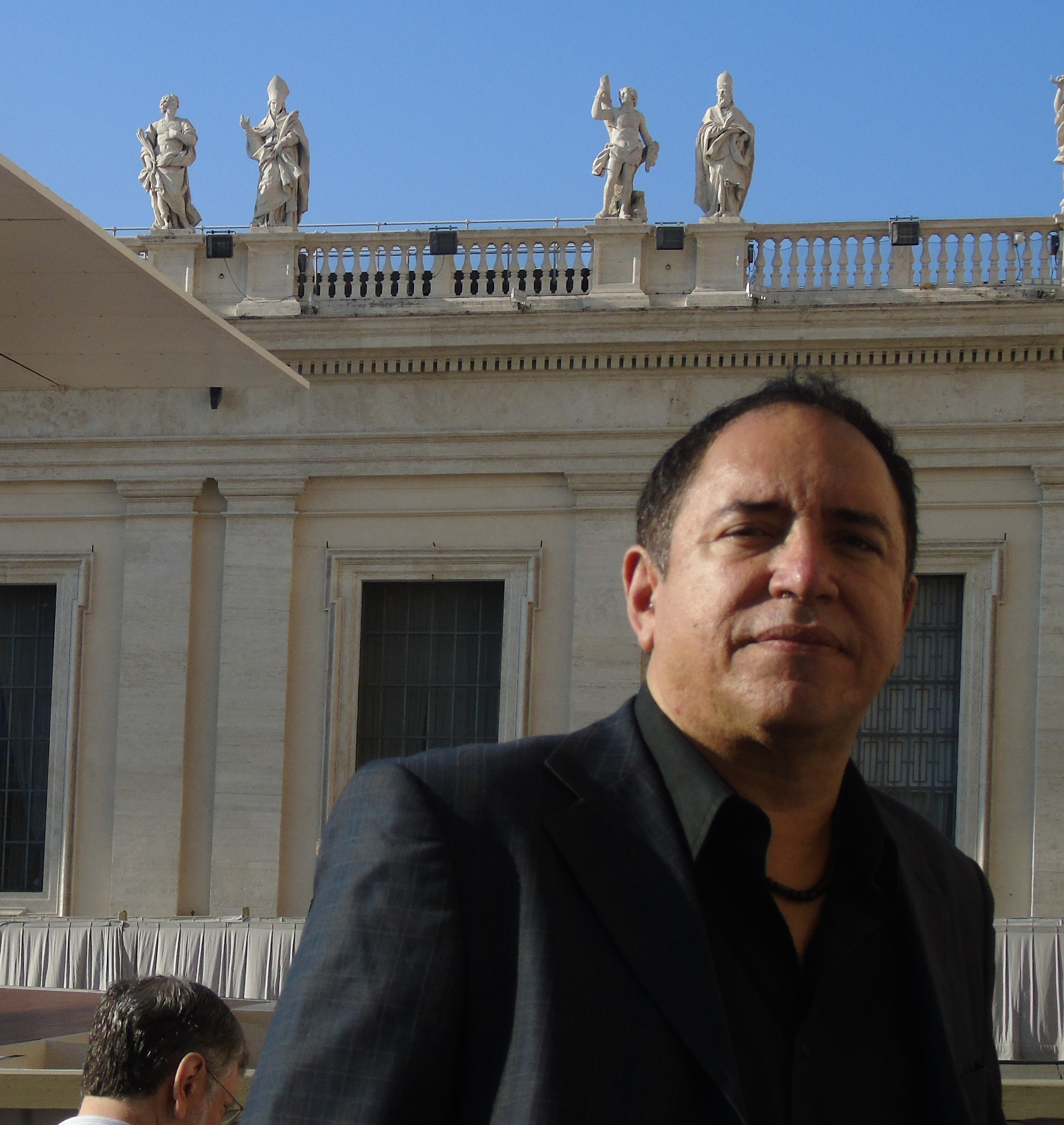
- Born: February 26, 1962; La Ceiba, Atlántida, Honduras
- Died: August 6, 2016 (aged 54); Hospital D'Antony, La Ceiba, Honduras
- Occupations: Singer, composer
- Spouse: Lastenia Godoy de Anderson
- Children: 3
- Musical career
- Instruments: Vocals, guitar
- Years active: 1987–2015
- Website: GuillermoAnderson.com

Guillermo Anderson (February 26, 1962 – August 6, 2016) was one of the best known Honduran musicians. A singer-songwriter, his lyrics often touch upon themes of ecology (including exaltation of Honduras' natural landscapes) and social problems.

== Early years ==
Guillermo Anderson was born in La Ceiba, Atlántida, Honduras, February 26, 1962, to Jorge Guillermo Anderson Sarmiento and Ida Avilés Sevilla. Guillermo Anderson grew up exposed to the mixture of Garifuna, North American, British, and Caribbean cultures characteristic to the Northern coast of Honduras, which later provided the basis for his artistic style. He attended the primary school at the Escuela Mazapán, in La Ceiba. It was in this school that he began to write his first poems and songs and learn chords on a toy banjo and sang for the first time on stage. In fourth grade Bill Stover, a teacher from North America, introduced him to American songwriters, like Paul Simon, Jim Croce, James Taylor and Crosby Stills and Nash. He attended secondary school at the Instituto San Isidro, also in La Ceiba. There he made friends with a cultural exchange student from North America, Gus Gregory, (Note: Guillermo Anderson's high school friend Gus Gregory, while aiding poor farmers in Peru in 1988, was murdered at age 25 by the Shining Path (Sendero Luminoso) Maoist group. This occurred only five weeks after Gregory married Dolores (Dolo) Fernandez, who was pregnant with their first child at the time.) who introduced him to progressive jazz of the eighties.

== His career in the United States ==
Guillermo, with encouragement of his friend Gus Gregory, traveled to the United States and studied at the University of California, Santa Cruz. There he majored in arts with focus on Hispanoamerican literature, but he also studied music and acting. He was introduced to composition and performance in the theater at the university. With college friends, Mexican American guitarist Eugene Rodríguez and Argentine bassist Pablo Aslán, he formed a bassist trio called "Now". This trio played traditional Latin American music and songs at college events, bars, and university spaces. He graduated from Santa Cruz in 1986 and subsequently worked in theater with "El Teatro De La Esperanza" in San Francisco, California, and El Teatro Campesino with Luis Valdez (producer of La Bamba). One of his most important experiences during this period was to perform in a bilingual theater for immigrant children, which resulted in his concert and album Para Los Chiquitos.

== Honduras career ==
In 1987 Guillermo returned to Honduras. Guillermo first received widespread recognition with his acoustic guitar and two Garifuna drummers. He created La Ceiba COLECTIVARTES, an artist movement with other group of artists, and invited other artists from Europe and USA to perform different works on La Ceiba. The most popular of these works was "Sabor A Sombra", based on Nelson Merren poetry.

After this, Guillermo started to make concerts and performances on festivals like "Aires de Abril" on Tegucigalpa and country sides of Honduras. During this era, Anderson made his first records of songs like; "Retratos" and "En Mi País" that recorded on cassettes that sell at his concerts. He often traveled to forest areas of Honduras, among them, La Mosquitia a kind of Central American Amazonia where he recovered their musical traditions.

== Tours ==
While performing in concerts in Tegucigalpa, Guillermo Anderson attracted the attention of foreign service officials from various countries and received invitations to festivals such as the "Cervantino International Festival" of Mexico and a concert at the "Memorial for Latin America," in San Pablo, Brazil. These two festivals gave rise to other invitations that propelled his career as a singer-songwriter.

The first release that Anderson announced in Honduras was "En Mi País", a song in which Anderson "tries to come to terms with returning to a country like Honduras, so full of contradictions." Anderson launched his career from La Ceiba with a prediction that it would not be possible to do so from there. But what seemed a weakness became a strength in the sense that a good part of the appeal of his work and the invitations he received from elsewhere in the world were because he worked from his roots in a city by the sea, in the little known Honduran Caribbean.

Another theme, "El Encarguito", is a song that celebrates the culinary diversity of Honduras and comments on the nostalgia of Honduran immigrants for their traditional foods. This release describes the typical foods that relatives send to Central American immigrants, which sometimes end up seized at US and European Customs. The song has become very popular among Honduran immigrants abroad. It was inspired by Anderson's curiosity to test the diversity of food in Honduras and his experience living abroad and missing the culinary flavors of his homeland.

With a solid discography of 12 productions and an extensive career, Anderson was constantly touring in Honduras and abroad. His music was and continues to be heard in Panama, Costa Rica, Nicaragua, El Salvador, Guatemala, United States of America, Brazil, Colombia, Venezuela, Ecuador, Argentina, Cuba and the Dominican Republic. In Europe he performed in Germany, France, Spain, Italy, England and The Netherlands. In Asia he received applause in Japan where he made 2 tours of 30 cities. He also toured Taiwan and South Korea. The presentations were sometimes voice and guitar and other times an intense show that performed with his group.

Guillermo Anderson in Concert

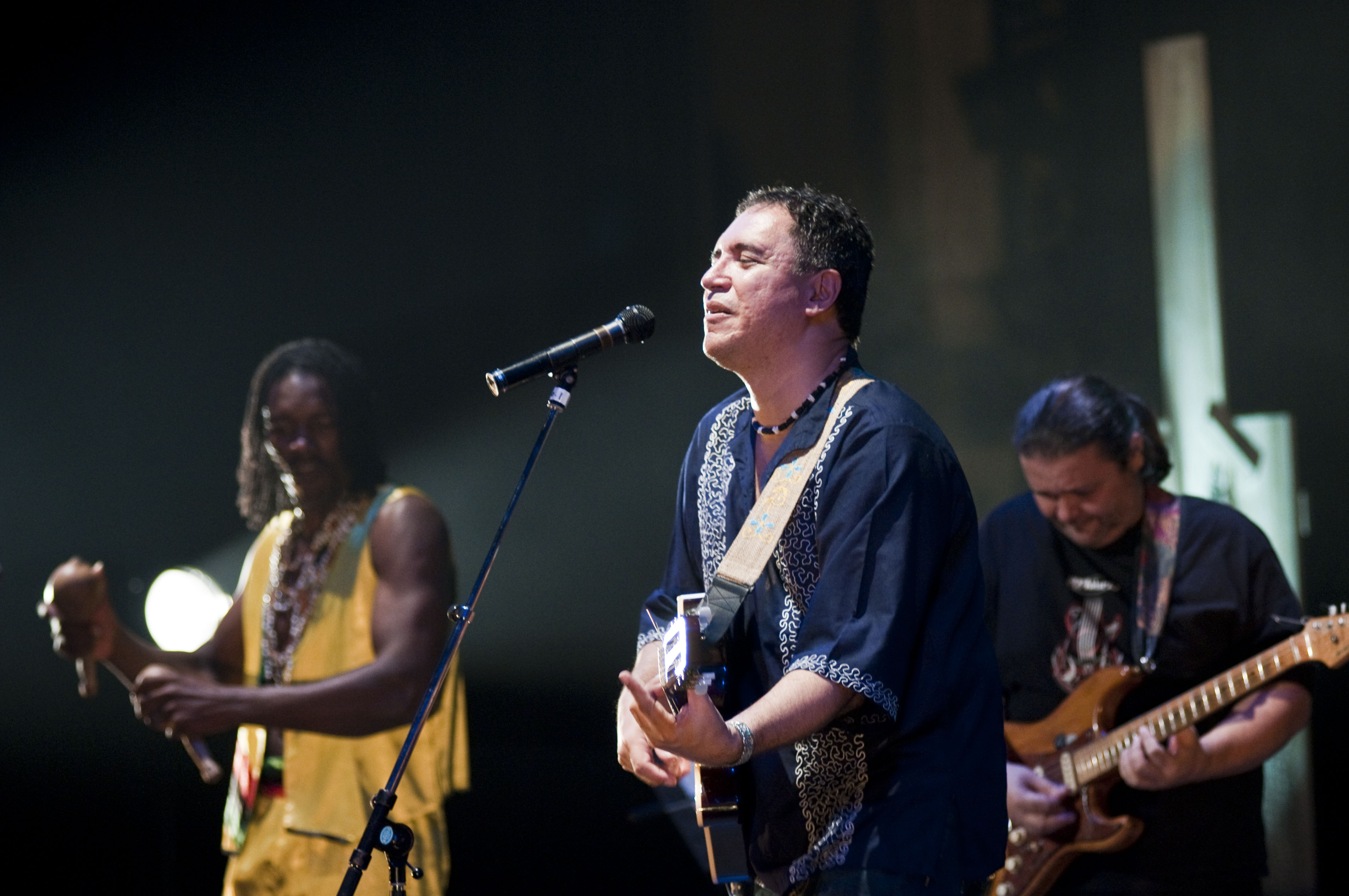

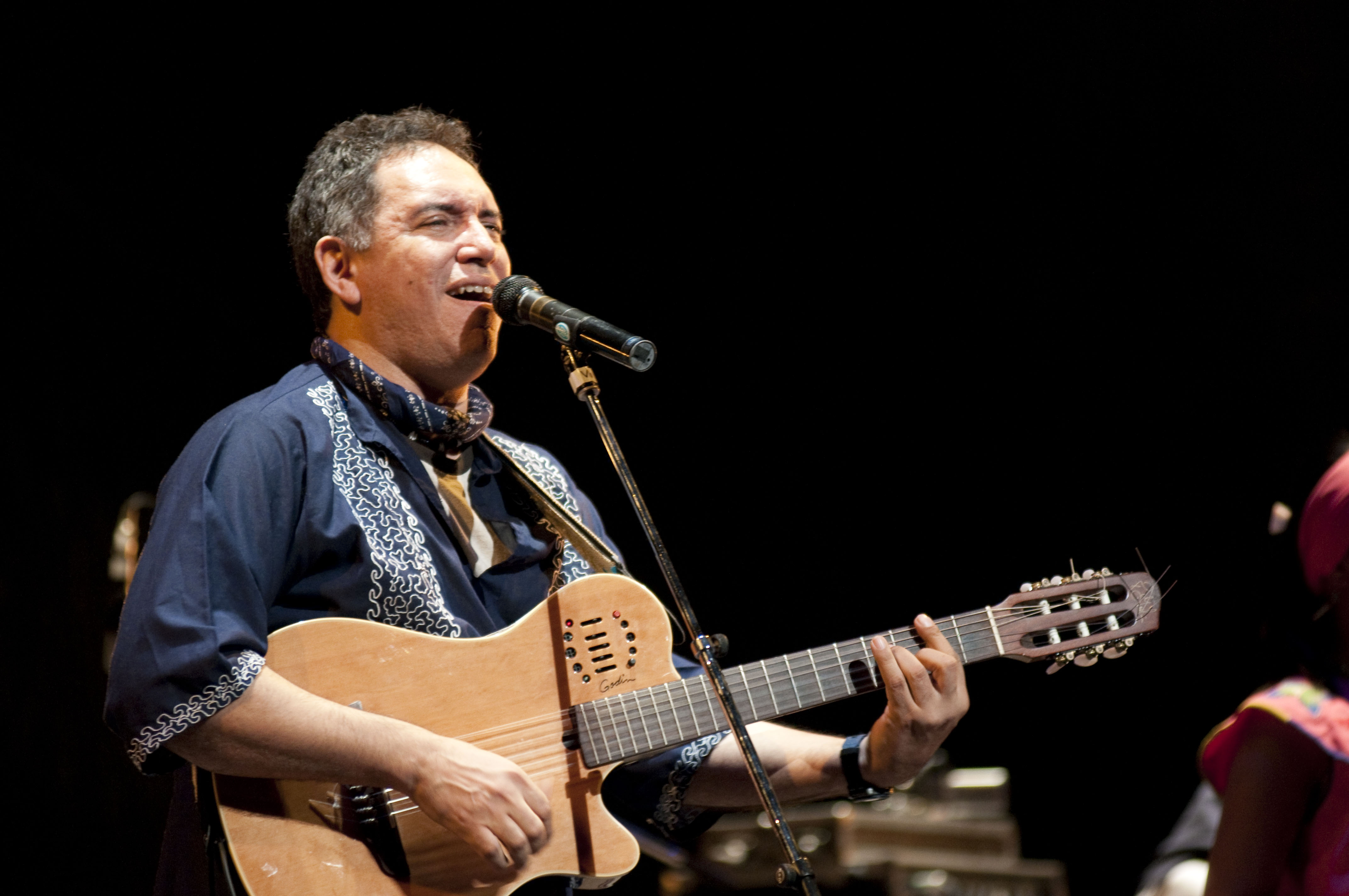

== Discography ==
Guillermo Andersons performances merged diverse music styles including parranda, punta, reggae, and salsa as well as latin jazz and rock, resulting in a style that has been described as "a combination of Afro-Caribbean percussions with contemporary sounds, local rhythms, and folklore of Honduras’ coastal regions." His songs are stories are about daily life and struggles of ordinary people in Honduras. Guillermo Anderson's song En mi país, released on the Pobre Marinero album in 2000, has become an alternative national anthem of Honduras, and his children's songs are sung throughout schools in Honduras. El Encarguito, released in 2003 on the Encarguitos del Caribe album, is also considered among his most successful songs both nationally and internationally.

Album name	Year	Record label	Format
Para Los Chiquitos	1986	Independiente	Cassette
En mi país	1987	Colectivartes	Cassette
Retratos	1989	Colectivartes	Cassette
La Fuerza Que Tenés	1992	Colectivartes/Comunica	Cassette
La Fiesta En El Bosque	1994	Colectivartes/Guaymuras	Cassette
En El Patio De Mi Casa	1995	Colectivartes /Comunica	Cassette
Para los Chiquitos	1995	Costa norte Records	Cassette
Rumor de Mar	1995	Colectivartes	Cassette
Guillermo Anderson Acústico	1997	Costa Norte Records	Cassette
Todos Unidos	2001	Costa Norte Records/UNESCO	Cassette
Encarguitos de el caribe	2005	CD	CD
Costa y Calor	2005		CD
Pobre marinero	2005		CD
El tesoro que tenes	2006		CD
Desde el fondo de el mar	2006		CD
Mujer canción mujer	2006		CD
Del tiempo y del tropico	2007		CD
Para los chiquitos	2008		CD
El tesoro que tenes	2009		CD
Lluvia con sol	2012		CD

== Books ==
=== Del Tiempo Y El Tropico – Honduras of Time and the Tropics ===
This book resulted from a collaboration between Guillermo Anderson, the Honduran novelist Julio Escoto, and the German artist Hannes Wallrafen. Wallrafen settled in La Ceiba to capture historical moments of the city, reflecting in his photographs the development of the Honduran Caribbean, the banana industry, the railroad, and domestic and daily life. On these themes, Escoto wrote fifteen texts, full of humor, irony, and signs of identity. Guillermo Anderson was inspired by both materials to create a new compact disc with ambient sounds and songs, among them his first bolero. The design was by professor Luis García Bueno.

An intensive collaboration carried out between 2001 and 2002 resulted in this literary work, containing 140 pages with 40 color photographs, hard bound in a wide format, with compact disc. The two bilingual editions, one Spanish-English edition and another Dutch-English edition, published by Koninklijk Instituut Voor De Tropen in 2002, were the first of their kind in Europe.

=== Bordeando La Costa ===
Bordeando La Costa (Bordering the Coast) contains stories of the sea and its characters: seagulls, dolphins, cayucos, mermaids, stars of the sky and of the water, birds that swim, fish that fly, winds that sing, storms whistling and turning away, children with light and dark eyes, incognito lights and bearded sailors who pipe human while holding the string with which they fish in the depth of hope.

This walk along the Honduran Caribbean coast is an ideal trip, in his words and drawings of Guillermo Anderson. Published in 2002 in San Pedro Sula, Honduras.

=== Ese mortal llamado Morazán ===
Costa Norte Records published unpublished artistic material of Guillermo Anderson on the anniversary of his birthday, February 26, 2017. These are 18 instrumental and sung compositions that Anderson composed for the play Ese mortal llamado Morazán (That mortal called Morazán), a stage show presented in 1992 at the National Theater and Cultural Center Sampedrano, but not made again because Guillermo considered that the recording was of low quality and he would record it again in study. He never did.

The work is based on the novel "General Morazán marches from the death", by Julio Escoto, which the ballet master Flor Alvergue choreographed in 1992 a ballet of modern style for the celebration of the bicentenary of birth of Francisco Morazán. Those who know this artistic composition of Anderson think that it is a work of great intellectual depth, with much feeling and nostalgia, to such a degree that some of the songs that comprise it, such as Morazán's complaint that politics has distanced his love from Mary Josefa, his wife, caused tears in the auditorium, in 1992.

Other titles deal with the march directed to save the Federal Republic in 1829 ("Two thousand men marking Guatemala"), the claim of the hero not to be considered only as a military man but as a statesman ("Do not draw me with that sword ") And the final, which is the testament of the hero, where he claims the injustice of his execution in Costa Rica, urges the young people to save the republic and declare their love for Central America.

After the technical cleaning of the audio system with modern systems, in February 2017 Costa Norte Records, in conjunction with Centro Editorial, offered Anderson's collectors and music lovers a limited edition of this unpublished disc, entitled "That mortal called Morazán ", accompanied by a special edition of the book of Scotus, so that the listener can follow the sequence between literature and the lyrical and rhythmic creation of Guillermo.

=== La fiesta en el bosque : guía de trabajo con los niños ===
A book of ideas for activities to be used in conjunction with the songs on the sound cassette La Fiesta en el Bosque.

== Tributes and achievements ==
As an artist, Guillermo Anderson participated in education, health, tourism, environment, and cultural heritage projects. Notably among these:

- He participated in HIV prevention campaigns.
- His work Mujer Canción Mujer (edited by the Instituto de La Mujer de Honduras in 2005) presents the role of women in songs that are used in self-esteem workshops women organize to generate discussion on the role of women in Honduran society.

Known in Honduras for his music for children, Anderson's work enjoys an important audience in elementary schools, many of which teach songs from his compact disc "Para los chiquitos". The disc presents in a pedagogical way fundamental concepts of ecology and familiarizes the children with species of the endangered tropical fauna.

Over 10 years, Guillermo Anders often visited the region of La Mosquitia to pursue concerns about the ecology of the Rio Plátano. He made a complete production on this topic and from this work people and governments began to pay attention to the Rio Plátano environment.

Among last achievements was creation of the "Círculo juvenil de tambores de La Ceiba" project. The purpose of this project was to prevent violence among young people between 13 and 18 years who lived in vulnerable neighborhoods of the city. With the support of the United Nations Development Program (UNDP), the project brought together young men and women and trained them in traditional Garífuna percussion. In addition to being an ensemble that participated in the cultural life of La Ceiba, this activity was accompanied by workshops of self-esteem, coexistence, gender and other personal and artistic expressions. The purpose was to create a creative space where ideas were respected and young people could learn tolerance and conflict resolution.

== Awards ==
- 2002 — Anderson was named "Embajador cultural de Honduras ante el mundo por el pueblo y gobierno de Honduras (Honduran cultural ambassador to the world for the people and government of Honduras)".
- 2003 — "Premio Nacional de Arte (National Art Award)" by the Ministry of Education of Honduras.
- 2003 — "Premio Copán de Turismo (Copan Tourism Award)" by the Cámara Nacional de Turismo for promoting Honduras around the world.
- 2005 — "Premio Identidad Nacional 2005 (National Identity Award 2005)" by the Museo para la Identidad Nacional.
- 2008 — The Secretary of State for Culture, Arts and Sports awarded Anderson with "La Orden Laurel de Oro" for his contribution to Honduran culture.
- 2008 — "Martin Luther King Jr Award" from the Martin Luther King Jr Foundation.
- 2015 — "Premio Ones Mediterrania" from the Fundació Mediterránia. (Note: The Fundació Mediterránia is an organization headquartered in Tarragona Spain that is dedicated to promoting environmental and social actions at the international level. The Premio Ones Mediterrania was awarded to Guillermo Anderson in recognition of his efforts "To promote through art and music campaigns in defense of education, the environment and universal health; to recover forgotten traditional Honduran music in danger of disappearing; being the voice of a country in need of referents; and for having become the cultural ambassador of Honduras in the world.")
- 2016 — Premio Nacional de Arte "Pablo Zelaya Sierra" awarded posthumously by the Secretaría de Desarrollo e Inclusión Social (SEDIS) (Note: Guillermo Anderson's daughter Marianela Anderson Godoy accepted the 2016 Pablo Zelaya Sierra award in March 2017 on behalf of her father, "Lo que puedo decir con toda certidumbre, que todo lo que sea de él que hay dentro de mi está lleno de gratitud, y aunque no sé si en el cielo hay televisión, estoy segura que mi padre está muy feliz." (What I can say with all certainty, that everything that is of him inside me is full of gratitude, and although I do not know if there is television in heaven, I am sure that my father is very happy.))

== Death ==
In November 2015 Anderson was diagnosed with anaplastic thyroid cancer. He died in company of his family on August 6, 2016, at the Hospital D'Antoni in La Ceiba, Atlantida.

On the day of his funeral the schools of La Ceiba lined the way that the coffin of the singer-songwriter would follow from the Cathedral to the cemetery. All the streets were filled by long lines of students paying homage to Guillermo Anderson.

The independence day parades, held on September 15, a month after his death, paid tribute to the late singer-songwriter Guillermo Anderson. Throughout the country, but especially in La Ceiba, one could see banners with texts of his songs and pictures of the singer-songwriter. The public attending the parades had the opportunity to remember the singer-songwriter.

The educational promotion of Honduras in 2016 was named "Guillermo Anderson" after the singer's death. Consequently, the Secretary of Education celebrated 200 days of classes in La Ceiba and paid tribute to the artist.

== See also ==
- Culture of Honduras
- Theater in Honduras
- Honduran music
- Javier Monthiel
- Moisés Canelo
