= Moisés Canelo =

Honduran singer and songwriter (1950–2024)

- Born: Moisés Canelas Whitol; July 9, 1950; Limón, Honduras
- Died: September 13, 2024 (aged 74); New York City, U.S.
- Other name: "La voz romántica hondureña"
- Occupations: Singer, composer
- Musical career
- Genres: Latin pop
- Instrument: Vocals
- Years active: 1976–2024
- Labels: Discos Orfeón, RCA Records, Continental Records, iTunes

Moisés Canelas Withol (July 9, 1950 – September 13, 2024), better known as Moisés Canelo, was a Honduran singer and songwriter.

== Early life and education ==
Moisés Canelas Withol, was born on July 9, 1950, in the village of Francia, of the municipality of Limón, department of Colón in the republic of Honduras. Because he was small, Moisés distinguished himself when he was young by singing in the banana fields of Coyoles Central. While in primary school at the Escuela Francisco Morazán in La Ceiba, he built on this foundation acting and singing on stage.

== Musical career ==
Moisés demonstrated artistic aptitude as a singer from age eight. As a teenager looking for ways to earn money singing, he joined the Banda Los Robbin´s of La Ceiba along with his childhood friend Ricardo Pereira. Later he performed in the group Happy Boy's in Tela, Honduras, where he wrote his first hit song, Noche de luna en La Ceiba. After recording their first single in the seventies, Moisés and the group became famous in Honduras and were invited to make musical tours, including his first international tour to the United States.

=== Musical festivals as soloist and recorded works ===
A Nicaraguan recording firm became interested in Canelo and invited him to record an LP (Long Play) alone. He accepted the agreement and the recording was made in Panama. Moisés Canelo's song "Yo también soy sentimental" from this recording was heard on Central American radios in the seventies and early eighties. Another record label followed, this time he recorded other works in the city of New Orleans. Then he represented Honduras in the OTI Festival 1974 with the song "Río viejo, viejo amigo" written by Horacio Cadalso. Mexicans were delighted with the voice of the Honduran, so Mexico became the singer's second home. Canelo interpreted his melodies in the famous Cardini Night Center located in Colonia Polanco. In 1970, Canelo in Honduras made a huge presentation at the Club Hondureño Árabe in Tegucigalpa. In 1976, he was again asked to represent Honduras at a song contest in Panama. Moisés performed the song "Latinoamericana" composed by maestro Alberto Ángel "El Cuervo", and obtained three awards: Best song, Best performance, and Best musical arrangement.

Moisés represented Honduras again at the OTI Festival 1980 with the song "Tú, siempre tú", by composer Alberto Valladares, placing seventh with 22 points. Canelo afterwards, with the help of Horacio Cadalso, moved to Mexico to study. In Mexico he recorded the work "Muchacho pobrey" with help from Francisco "Paco" from the company Discos Orfeón. This work was picked up by radio broadcasters. Subsequently, Canelo worked with Luis Rubio of the RCA Victor Company to record three LPs: "Te quiero cada día más" and "Llegaste tú" entirely of his own composition, in addition to the song "Por amores como tú" composed by Canelo and the Peruvian composer Edwin Alvarado. Afterwards, Canelo's recording works were on his independent labe. "“Esta Cobardía", "Un buen Perdedor" and "Mensajero del Amor" provided the official theme of the visit of the pontiff John Paul II to Central America in the month of March 1983 . The themes were also broadcast on Vatican Radio as a background to Spanish language transmissions. Other recorded works were recompilation LP of "Tangos". The Mexican presenter Jorge Saldaña of Channel 13 today "TV Azteca", supported him in his auditions and presentations. Also in Mexico, Moisés Canelo, with the help of Marco Antonio Lugo, recorded the song "Amor Pirata" by the composer Paz Martínez, recorded by the company Discos Continental de México. This theme moved Canelo to international prominence. Canelo was based in Mexico for twenty-four years.

Back in his native Honduras, Moisés Canelo looked for a way to produce a new work. That's how the song "Honduras, Vaya pues" and other more traditional Honduran repertoire, which envelops the magical notes of the marimba with sounds of the Marimba USULA of San Pedro Sula. Canelo has developed his artistic talents as a singer-songwriter with the help of well known professionals, such as the teacher Ana Grave de Peralta, with Solfeggio, and in classical guitar performance with Gonzalo Torres; Vocalization, with Mario Zea; Harmony, with Joaquín Pessina; and stage performance with Sergio Bustamante. All these individuals in one way or another helped develop him as an artist. Honduran journalist Víctor Donaire, in an interview with the newspaper El Heraldo considers Moisés Canelo "the most romantic voice that has lasted the longest on the national artistic scene".

=== Presentations with Famous Performers ===
Among famous Hispanoamerican musicians, he performed with : Armando Manzanero, Carlos Lico, Camilo Sesto, Gualberto Castro, José José, Juan Gabriel, Marco Antonio Muñiz, Miguel Aceves Mejía, Moarés Moreira, Los Ángeles Negros, Pedro Vargas, Roberto Carlos, Rocío Jurado, Sandro and Vicente Fernández, among others.

=== International Television Productions ===
Canelo performed extensively internationally, among these performances were: Festival of the OTI Song of Panama; Festival of the Song OTI of Acapulco, State of Guerrero in Mexico; Festival of the OTI Song of Buenos Aires, Republic of Argentina; the Spanish television program 300 Millions TVE, Cadena Milkie Shake of Brazil, on the Mundo Latino network, "Mala Noche No" program of the Televisa company and directed by the Mexican actress and singer Verónica Castro; Program "Un Poco más" of channel 11; Program "Nostalgia" of channel 13 of the company TV Azteca of Mexico and Program "Despierta América" of the American Hispanic chain Univisión of Miami, Florida. In events and contests such as election of Miss Honduras, Gala Dinners and Dances in La Casa del Hondureño in Glendale 2012, and Miami in February 2016.

== Death ==
Canelo died from a stroke in New York City, on September 13, 2024, at the age of 74.

== Awards and recognition ==
In the course of his artistic life, the Honduran singer received many awards, decorations and recognition, including:

- Ciudadano distinguido de San Pedro Sula.
- Hijo Predilecto de la ciudad de La Ceiba.
- Medalla al Mérito, otorgado por el Congreso Nacional de Honduras.
- Medalla en el recital de Otoño, otorgado por la ciudad de San Pedro Sula, Honduras.
- La Hoja de Laurel, otorgada por el Presidente de la república de Honduras.
- Premio Julio Escoto
- Las Llaves de la ciudad de Los Ángeles, California, Estados Unidos de América.
- Las Llaves de la ciudad de Nueva Orleans, Estados Unidos de América.
- Las Llaves de la ciudad de Nueva York, Estados Unidos de América.

== Discography ==
- Los Robbin's
- Veinte éxitos y un millón de recuerdos (1992) Discos Continental.
- Tropicanelo (2012)

== Famous songs ==
- "Noche de luna en La Ceiba"
- "Yo también soy sentimental”
- "Río viejo, viejo amigo”
- "Esta cobardía"
- "Mensajero del Amor”
- "Vaya pues"

== See also ==
- Culture of Honduras
- Music of Honduras
- Guillermo Anderson
- Javier Monthiel

== Bibliography ==
- Colindres O. Ramiro. Enciclopedia hondureña ilustrada de personajes históricos y figuras contemporáneas. Volumen dos, Graficentro editores, Tegucigalpa, Honduras. 1994. Universidad de Virginia, U.S.A.
- "Biografía de Moisés Canelo". Buena Musica.
- "Moises Canelo: Biografía". lost.fm.
- "Moises Canelo el maestro de la musica Hondureña". Conexion HN.
