= Culture of Honduras =

Traditional dance of Honduras.

The wealth of cultural expression in Honduras owes its origins primarily to being a part of Latin America but also to the multi-ethnic nature of the country. The population comprises 90% Mestizo, 7% Indigenous, 2% African descent, and 1% White. This influences all facets of the culture: customs, practices, ways of dressing, religion, rituals, codes of behavior and belief systems.

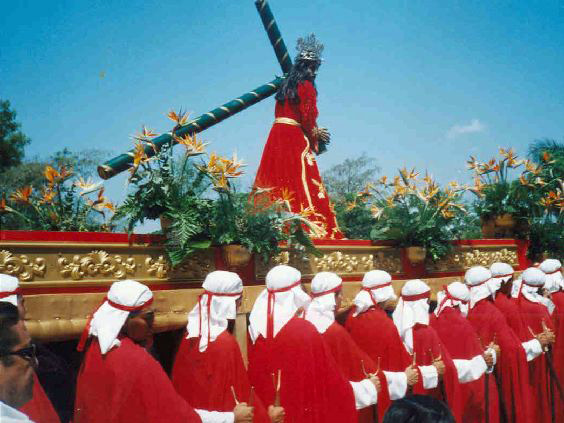
Holy Week in Honduras.

== Popular culture ==
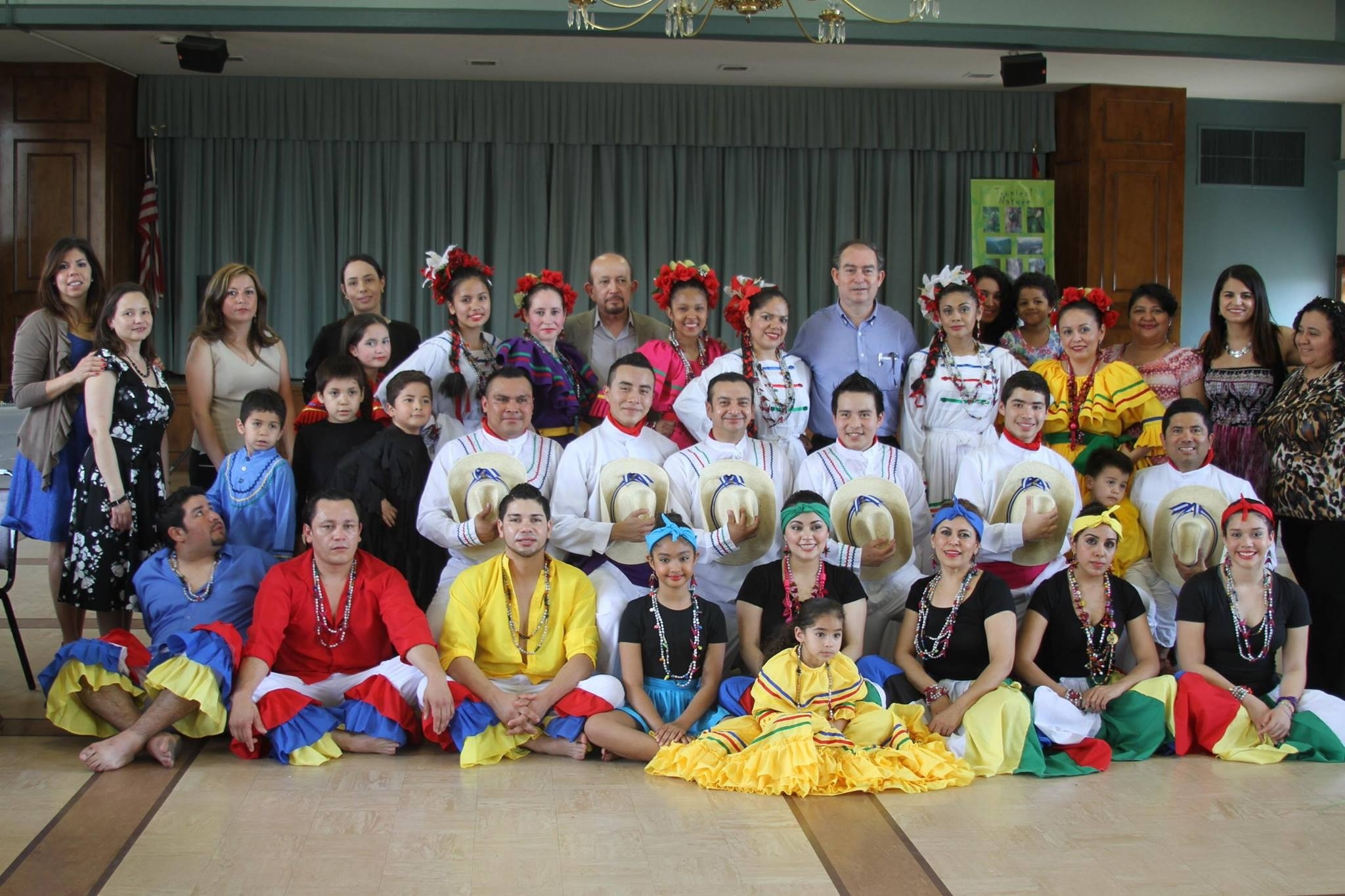
Group of dancers with typical costumes from Honduras.

Popular culture in Honduras, as in most countries, is expressed not so much through sophisticated artistic creations, but rather by popular events that draw big crowds. In Honduras, such artistic and cultural events are held on specific days of the year and through special celebrations. Punta is a kind of dance and music the Hondurans proudly gather to do.

Hondurans celebrate national holidays and special events in the form of carnivals, fairs and parades throughout the year. For instance, in La Ceiba the annual carnival is a week-long celebration with music, exhibitions and special food, culminating in the most popular carnival in the country: "The Carnival of Friendship".

The Feria Juniana (June Fair) of San Pedro Sula includes musical concerts performed throughout the week, sporting events and exhibitions.

Puerto Cortés celebrates its fair in August with a "Venice" theme which includes parades of gondolas and other boats in the bay, and an evening fireworks display launched from boats.

Being a predominantly Catholic country, Honduras gives special attention to the celebrations of Holy Week. In some regions of the country, such as Comayagua, Choluteca, Copán and Intibucá, processions are held, especially during Thursday and Good Friday. Through these events, Hondurans commemorate the sacrifice Jesus Christ made for humanity by reenacting the events during the week between Palm Sunday and Jesus Christ crucifixion.

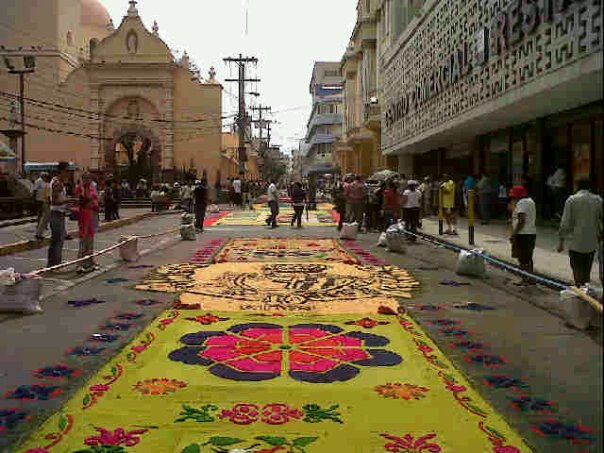
Sawdust carpet in Holy Week.

One of the notable Holy Week traditions is the creation of sawdust carpets along procession routes. These temporary artworks are prepared for religious processions and often depict Christian themes.

Hondurans celebrate Christmas Eve and New Year's Eve on 24 and 31 December respectively. During these celebrations, the majority of Honduran homes cook special dishes to mark the occasion. Favorites include tamales wrapped with banana leaves, roast pigs' legs, and pastries. All of these celebrations are complemented at the end of the night with fireworks and firecrackers.

Other celebrations of special interest to Hondurans include Mothers' Day, Children's Day, Labor Day, Teachers' Day and Friendship Day.

== Ethnic cultures ==
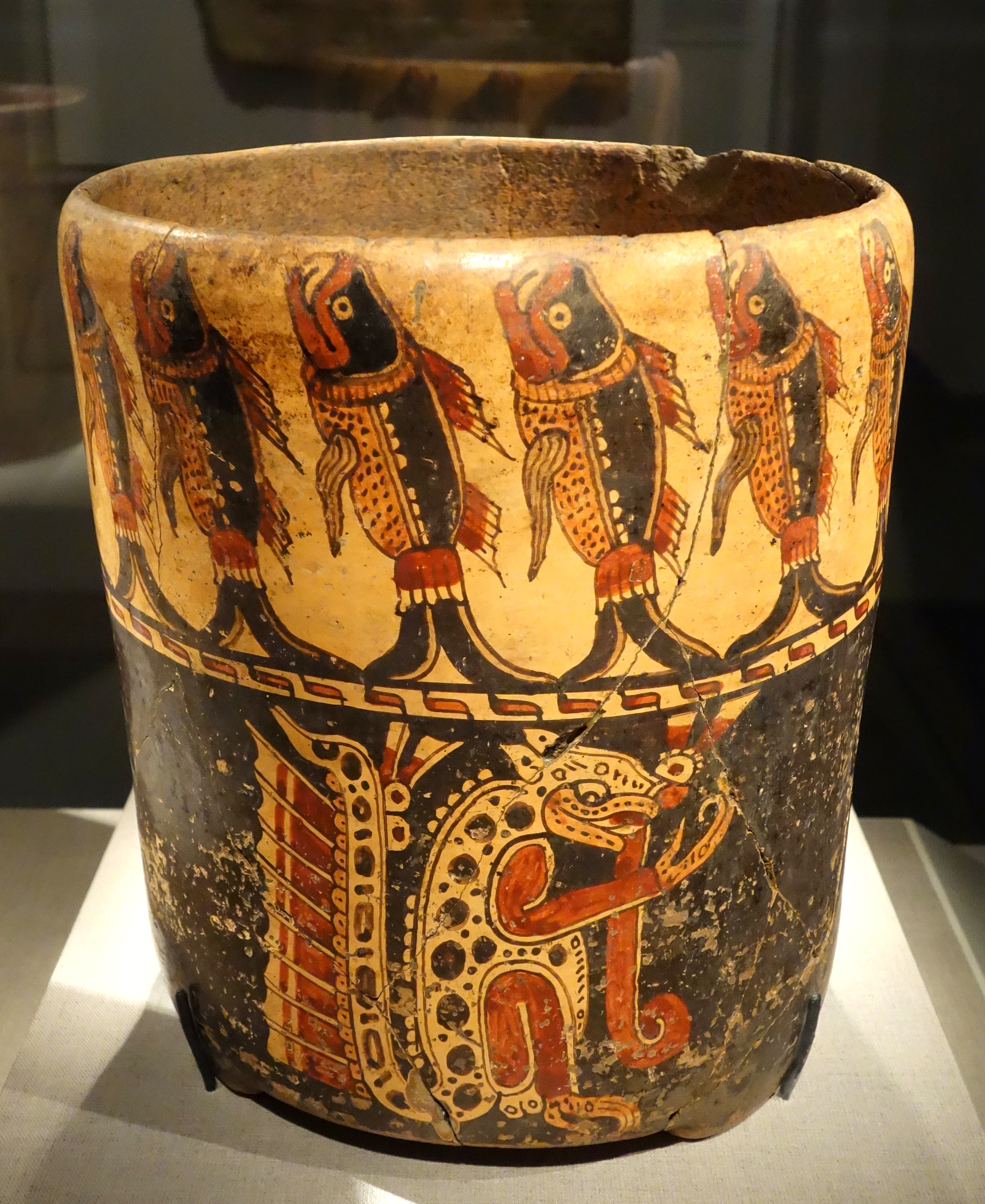
Pre Columbian pottery from the Ulua region.

The predominant ethnic group in Honduras are the mestizo - people of mixed native and European (mostly Spanish) descent. Mestizos account for over 84% of the population of Honduras. There are several other minority ethnic groups. Amongst them are people who descend from native tribes that lived in the area before the Spanish arrived: Lencas, Chortís, Tolupanes, Pechs (also called Payas), Tawahkas, and Miskitos.

There is also a group called the Garífunas who descend from African slaves from the Caribbean islands.

According to the 2001 census the Amerindian population in Honduras included 381,495 people (6.3% of the total population). With the exception of the Lenca and the Ch'orti' they still keep their language.

Six different Amerindian groups were counted at the 2001 census:

- the Lenca (279,507 in 2001;4.6% of the total population) living in the La Paz, Intibucá, and Lempira departments;
- the Miskito (51,607 in 2001; 0.8%) living on the northeast coast along the border with Nicaragua.
- the Ch'orti' (34,453 in 2001;0.6% of the total population), a Maya group living in the northwest on the border with Guatemala;
- the Tolupan (also called Jicaque, "Xicaque", or Tol; 9,617 in 2001; 0.2% of the total population), living in the department of Yoro and in the reserve of the Montaña de la Flor and parts of the department of Yoro;
- the Pech or Paya Indians (3,848 in 2001; 0.1% of the total population) living in a small area in the Olancho Department;
- the Sumo or Tawahka (2,463 in 2001; <0.1%)

=== Lenca culture ===
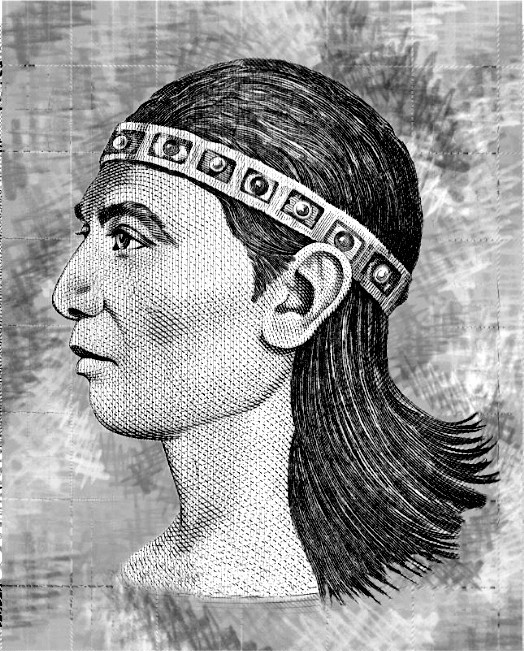
Lempira, Lenca leader and war lord.

The Lenca society forms the majority indigenous group, they gave resistance to the Spanish conquerors, who had to resort to various tactics and tricks to be able to subdue them. Chief Lempira, one of the Honduran heroes, was part of the Lencas tribe. His death at the hands of Rodrigo Ruiz, meant the final conquest of Honduran territory by the Spanish.

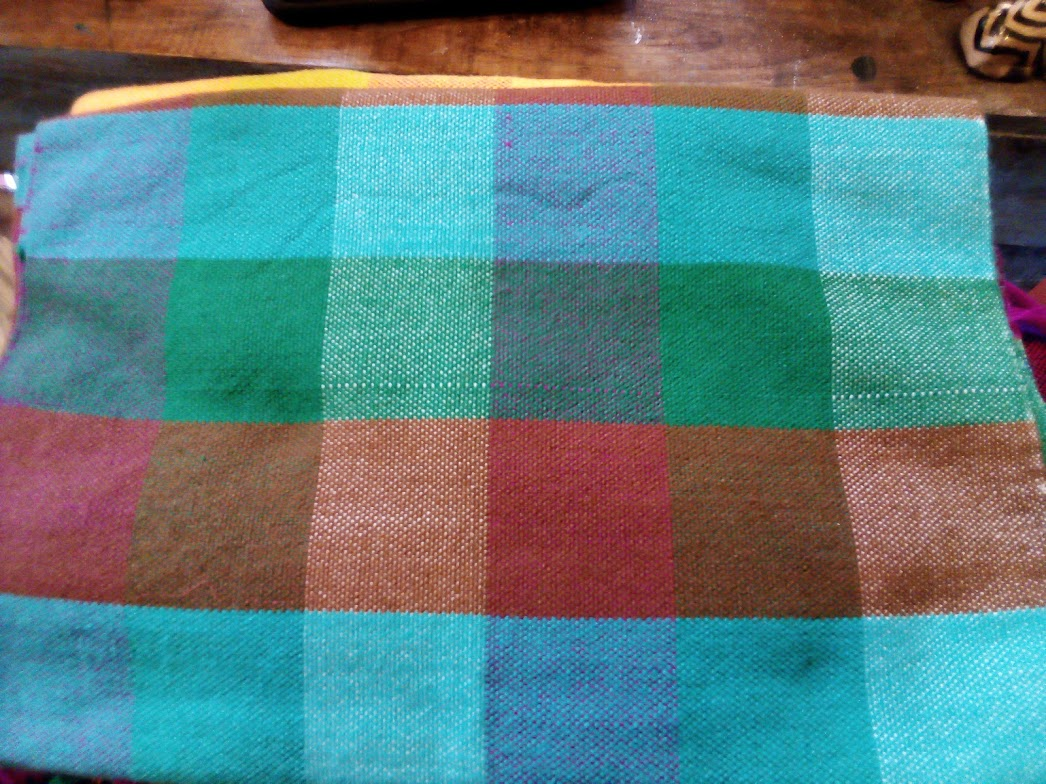
Lencan cloth.

In the cultural part, the Lencas have lost their language and most of their religious practices, although they still practice peace pacts among themselves, as well as offerings to their ancestral gods, and some of them still retain their original way of dressing. Their food base comes from the sowing of basic grains, especially corn, from where they contributed culturally to Honduras the ‘Chicha’; in the artistic-economic plane the Lencas stand out for their pottery.

=== Garifuna culture ===
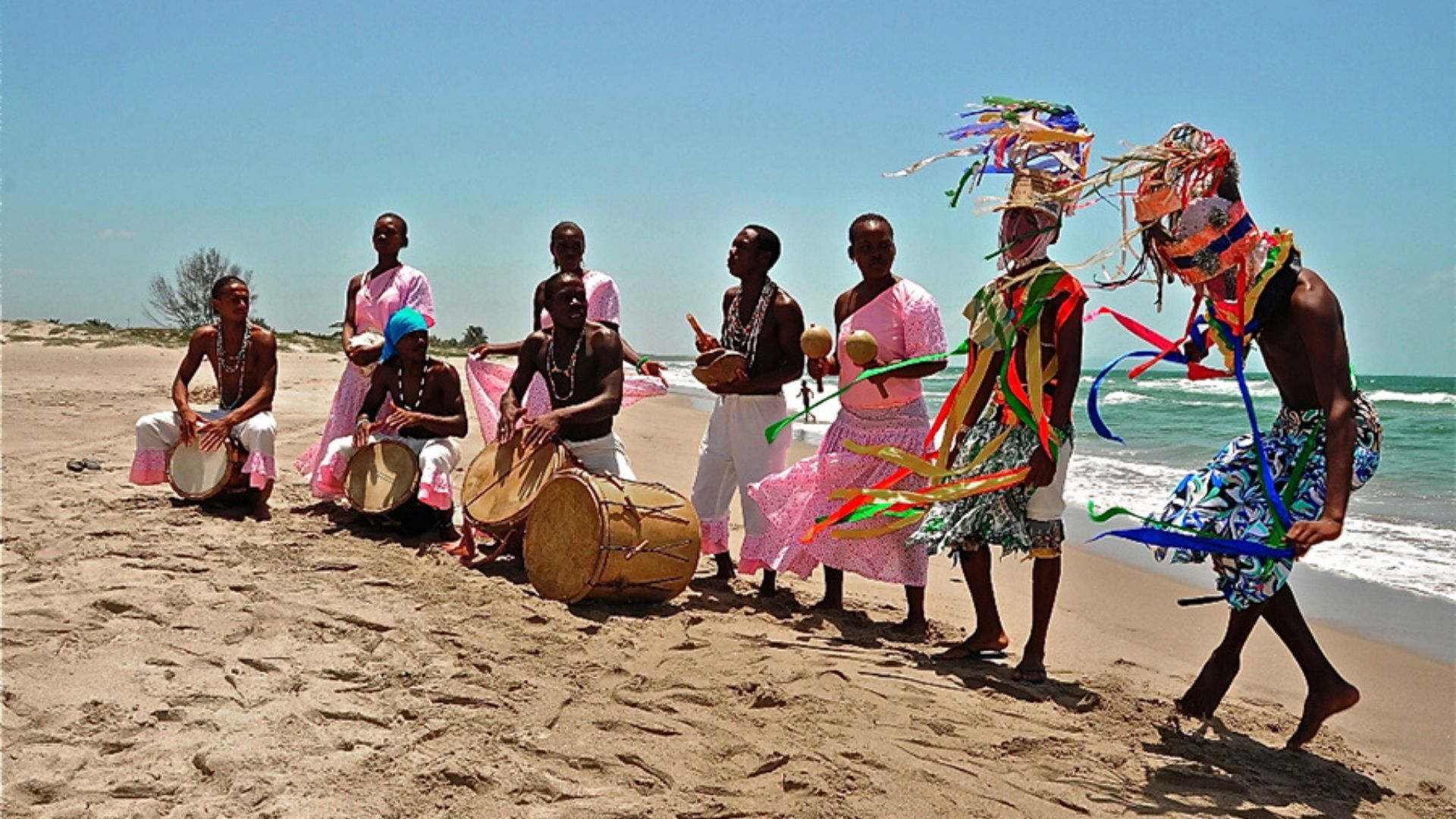
Graifuna traditional dance.

The Garífuna of Honduras come from the Lesser Antilles and more specifically from the island of San Vicente. From this place, the Garífunas were deported by the English in small boats, reaching the Bay Islands in 1797. This group of approximately 2000 Garífunas was later joined in the late 1800s and early 1900 by another considerable number of Garifuna immigrants with the purpose of alleviating the labor shortage in Honduras. Throughout its history, the Garífuna have settled on the Atlantic coast of Honduras, being the departments of Islas de la Bahía, Cortés, Atlántida and Colón where the largest number of Honduran Garífunas are concentrated.

This territory has allowed this group to depend on the marine resources provided by the northern coast of Honduras. Seafood, grains, fruits, and coastal legumes are part of the nutritional base of this ethnic group, among which are: Fish, bananas and yucca. From the latter they take the famous ‘casabe’, which is served almost daily in Garífuna households.

The Atlantic coast of Honduras also allows the Garífunas to preserve their Afro-Caribbean customs, among which are: Their Garífuna language, their religious system known as ‘Dugú’. Although today, the majority have come to accept the Catholic religion. The most important cultural contribution of the Honduran Garífuna in the world is the dance 'Punta' which reached high levels of popularity in the early 1900s after the musical success 'Sopa de Caracol', promoted by the group 'Banda Blanca' from Honduras. At the sporting level, the Garífuna have excelled greatly, particularly in soccer. Many have been the members of this ethnic group, who have been part of the Honduras soccer team.

As of 2019, the National Autonomous University of Honduras celebrates the Garífuna National Interuniversity Cultural, Artistic and Academic Encounter annually.

== Famous Hondurans ==
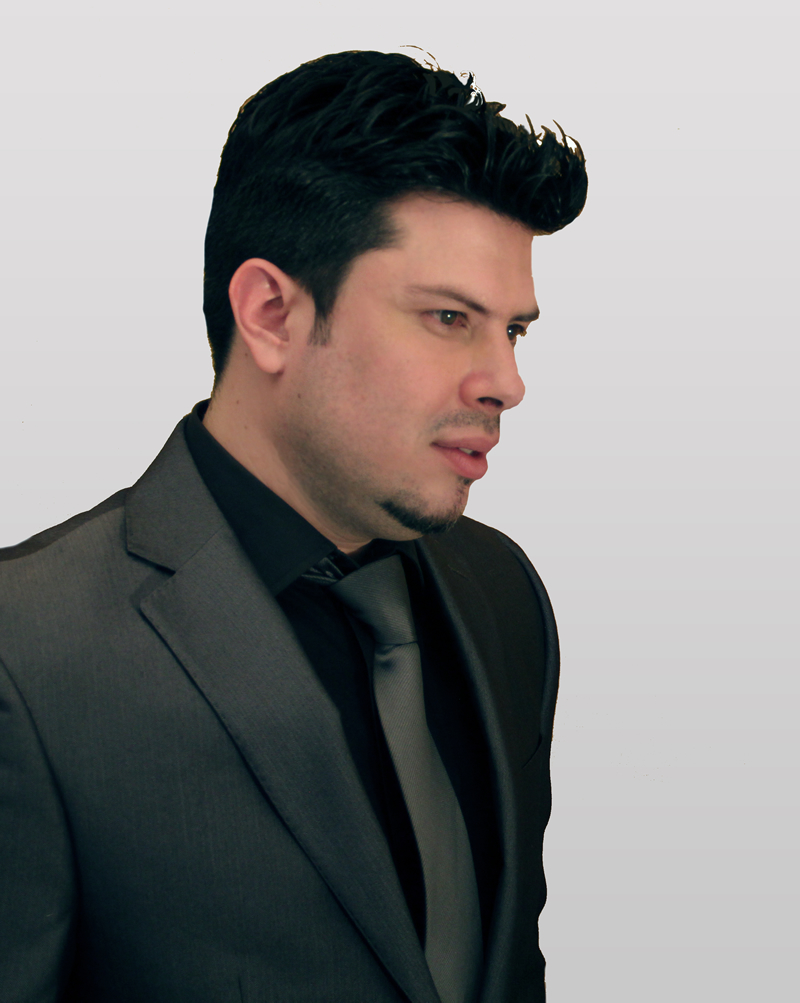
Juan Carlos Fanconi, Film Director

Honduran Cardinal Óscar Andrés Rodríguez Maradiaga was a candidate to replace Pope John Paul II after his death in 2005 and Pope Benedict XVI after his retirement in 2013.

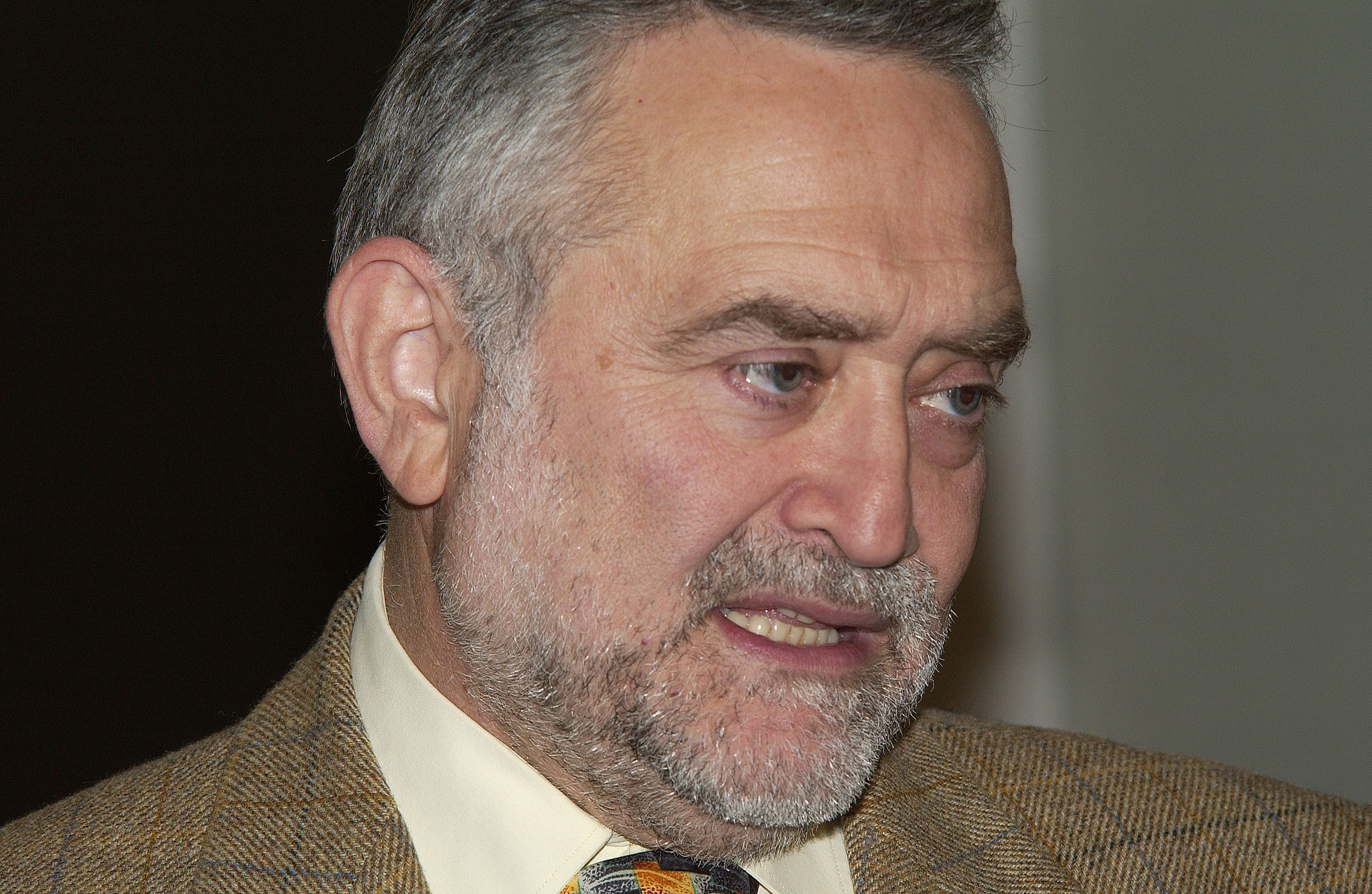
Sir Salvador Moncada. Honduran pharmacologyst.

Salvador Moncada is a scientist of Honduran origin. He is married to Princess Marie-Esméralda of Belgium. His principal area of study is pharmacology, especially with respect to the effects of products of the metabolism of diverse acids, as well as the synthesis, action, and degradation of the biological mediator nitric oxide.

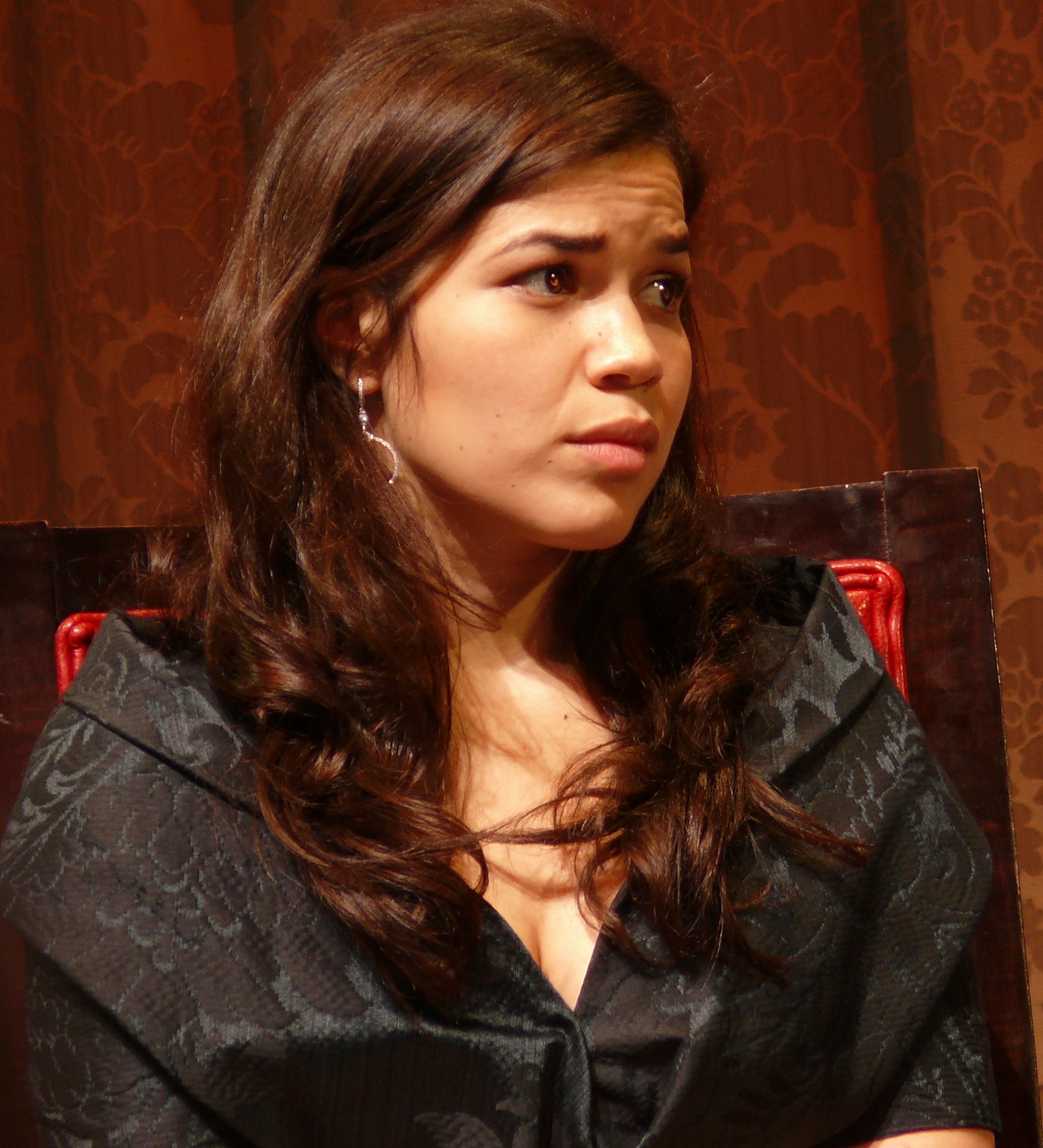
Actress America Ferrera.

America Ferrera, an American actress, was born in Los Angeles to Honduran parents. Best known for the lead role in ABC's "Ugly Betty", she has also been successful on the big screen with her role in Real Women Have Curves. She has also won a Golden Globe Award and received recognition from the Screen Actors Guild. Juan Carlos Fanconi, is the most famous Honduran film director of the last decade, within his filmography he has collaborated with actors of Colombian, Argentine, and Mexican origin in many Honduran productions.

David Archuleta, finalist and runner-up of season 7 of "American Idol," and Jive Records artist, was born in Miami, Florida to a Honduran mother, Lupe, and an American father, Jeff. On September 17, 2009, he was awarded Male Music Rising Star at the 2009 ALMA Awards (American Latino Media Arts Awards). David performed "Contigo En La Distancia" on the show, receiving strong praise and recognition from critics and viewers alike. He has also won five Teen Choice Awards.

Neyda Sandoval and Satcha Pretto work with Univisión of the United States. Renán Almendárez Coello from Honduras is the morning man on radio station KLAX-FM of Los Angeles. He has been active in charity work, assisting the poor of Central America and Mexico.

=== Athletes ===
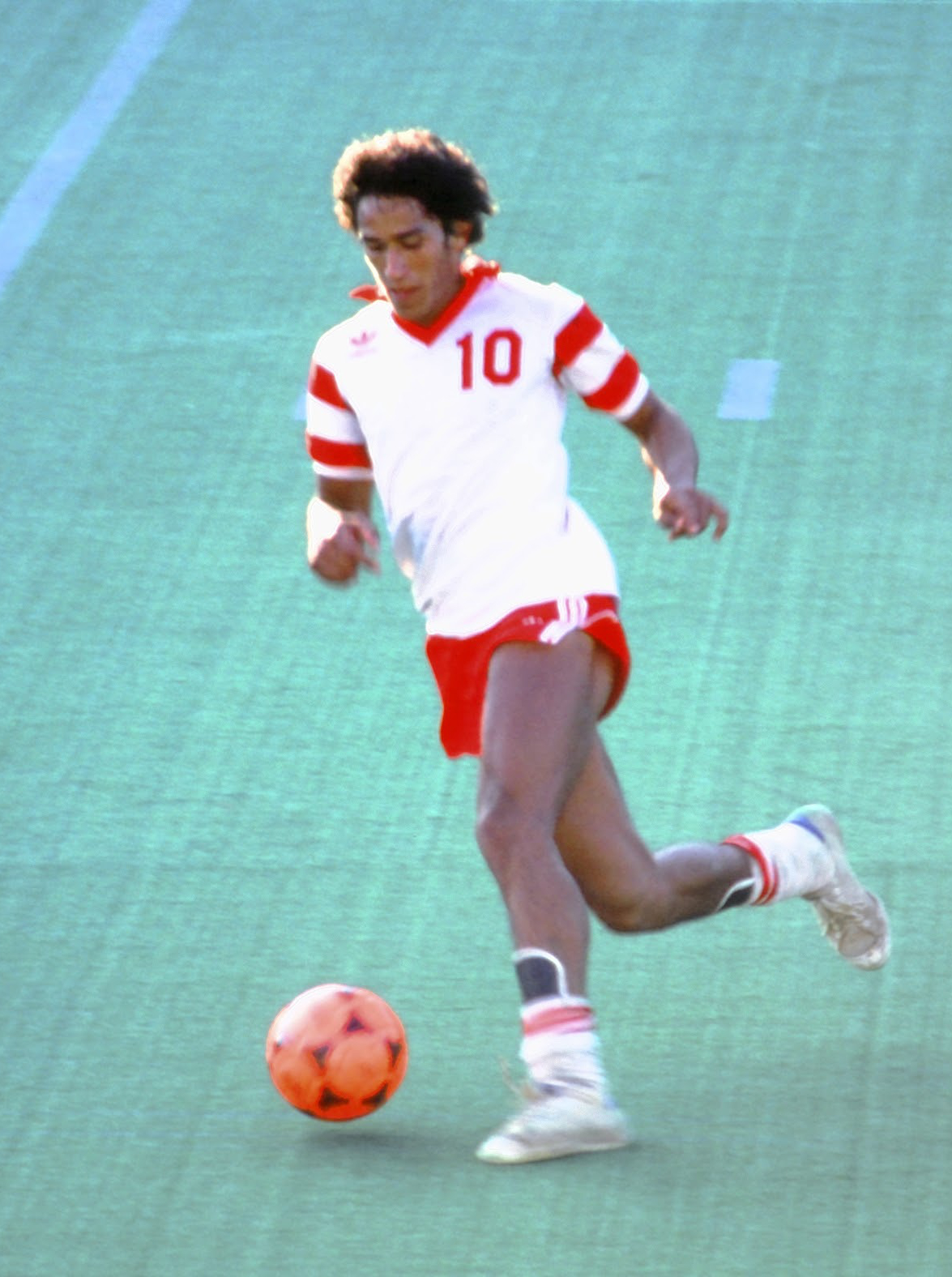
Footballer Porfirio Betancourt, 1981, one of the first hispanic players for the NASL.

The most popular sport in Honduras is Association football. Among the most outstanding players are José Cardona who played for Atlético Madrid in Spain; Gilberto Yearwood who played in Elche, Spain; Porfirio Betancourt, who played in France, Spain, and the United States, Carlos Pavón, who currently plays for Real España; and David Suazo, who used to be a player of Internazionale, who was named The Most Valuable Foreign Player of the Italian league in 2006.

Others footballers include Wilson Palacios in Stoke City of England, Maynor Figueroa in Hull City of England; Amado Guevara in Motagua, Honduras; and Carlo Costly in SC Vaslui of Romania.

Gallery

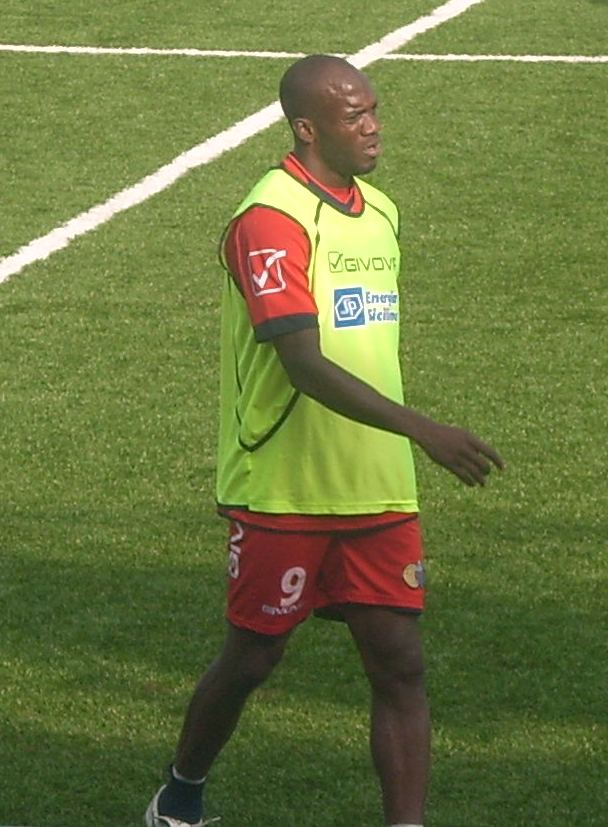
David Suazo.

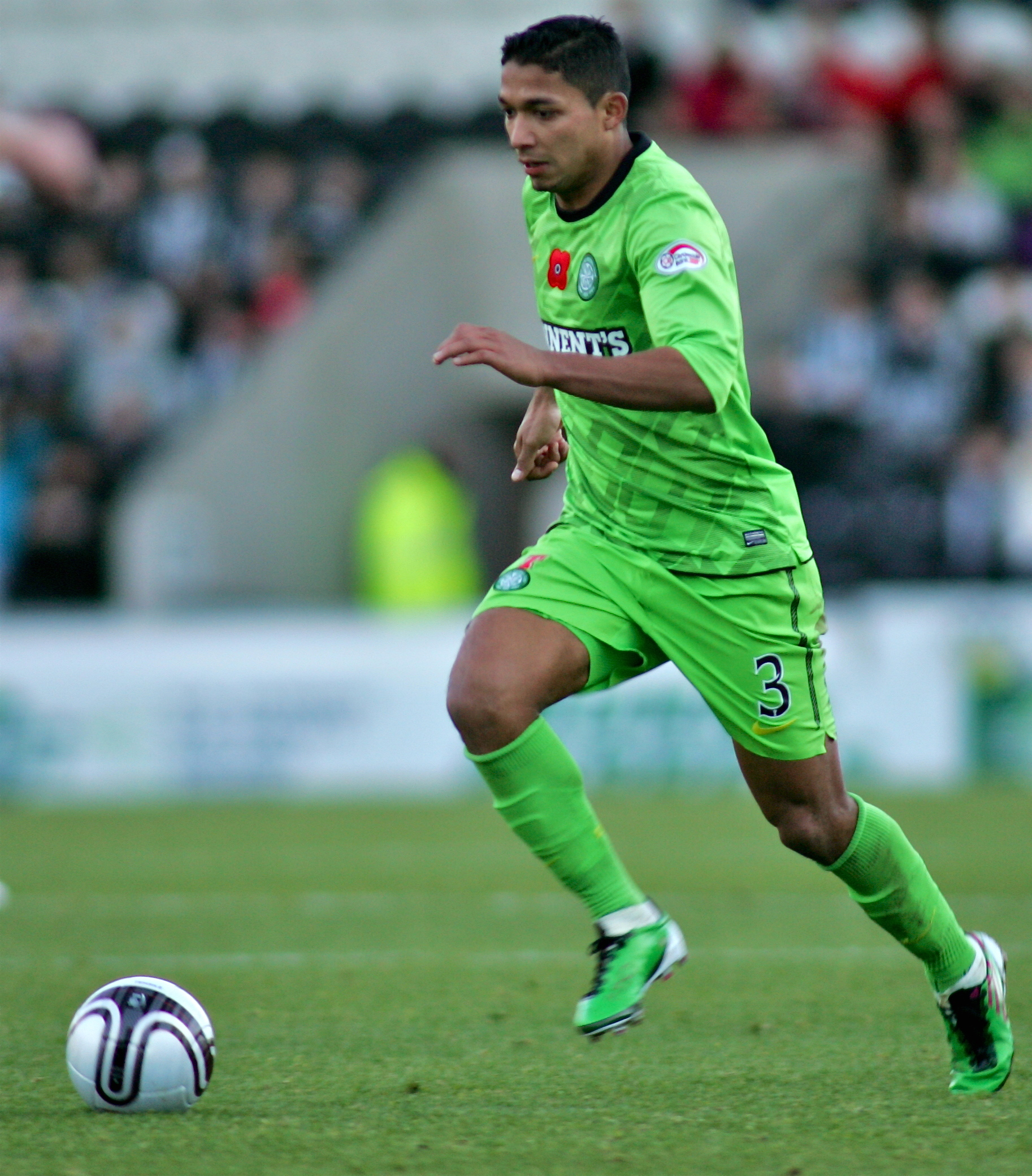
Emilio Izaguirre

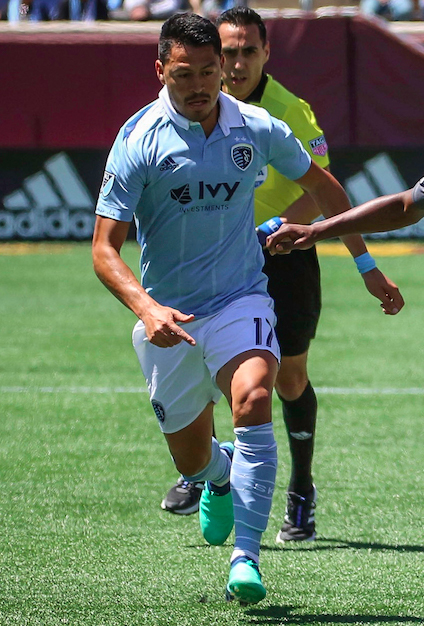
Roger Espinoza

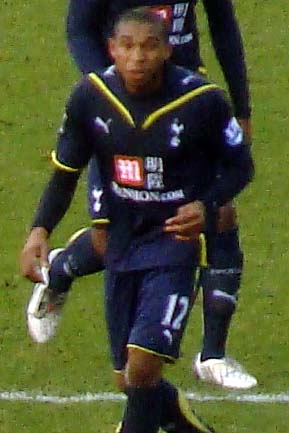
Wilson Palacios

=== Musicians ===
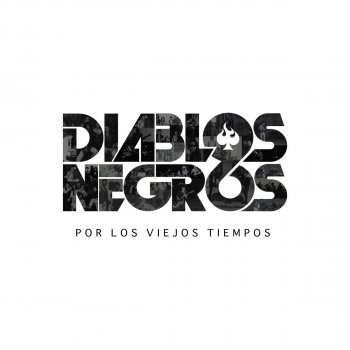
Diablos Negros, is a Honduran hard Rock band active since the 1980s.

Music in Honduras has flourished since pre-Hispanic periods, long before the colony, some of the autochthonous pre-Hispanic instruments are the following: Aerophones, Yaxchilan Mud Frog, Zampoñas, Quenas, Charangos, Drums. After colonization, new musical instruments were created: the snail, flutes, some percussion instruments and the Marimba. Within Creole or folk music we have the following: El Candú, El Pitero, Torito Pinto, Flores de Mimé, El Bananero.

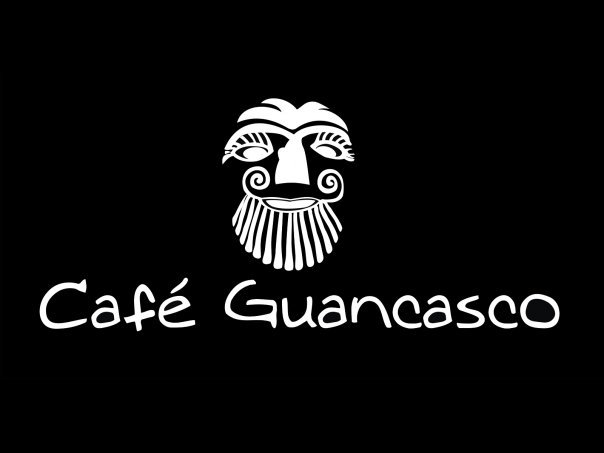
Cafe Guancasco, is one of the best exponents of Honduran pop rock.

Some notable Honduran musicians include Rafael Coello Ramos, Lidia Handal, Victoriano López, Jorge Santos, Norma Erazo, Sergio Suazo, Hector David, Angel Ríos, Jorge Mejia, Javier Reyes, Guillermo Anderson, Victor Donaire, Francisco Carranza, Camilo Rivera Guevara, Héctor David, Javier Monthiel and Moisés Canelo.

Escuela de Música Victoriano López in San Pedro Sula city.

At the international level the musical group Banda Blanca stood out, with their hits "Sopa De Caracol", "Do you Know Who Came?" and "Fiesta". Although the group produces merengueros rhythms, the Calypso and other Caribbean rhythms, their specialty is the Punta style, which they popularized during the 1990s.

Other musical groups include The Professionals, The Gran Banda, The Rolands, Angeles negros, Cafe Guancasco, and Atomic Rose.

=== Writers ===
The literature in the territory of present-day Honduras dates back more than 1,500 years ago, it was developed by the Mayan civilization in the city of Copán, the Mayan Script of our ancestors that used logograms and syllabic glyphs Mayan literature is preserved in the stelae, pyramids and temples at Copán. The city of Copán is home to the most informative pyramid in America, the Pyramid of Hieroglyphs that has more than 2,500 glyphs.

Among the most notable writers from Honduras are David Fortin, Froylán Turcios Juan Ramón Molina, Rafael Heliodoro Valle, Antonio José Rivas, Clementina Suárez, Ramón Amaya Amador, Marco Antonio Rosa, Roberto Sosa, Lucila Gamero de Medina, Roberto Quezada, Armando García, Helen Umaña, Alberto Destephen, Argentina Díaz Lozano, Rony Bonilla and Julio Escoto. Contemporary writers include Ernesto Bondy Reyes, Giovanni Rodríguez, Glenn Lardizábal, Bayardo de Campoluna, Venus Ixchel Mejía, Alex Darío Rivera, Azucena Ordoñez Rodas, among others.

Gallery

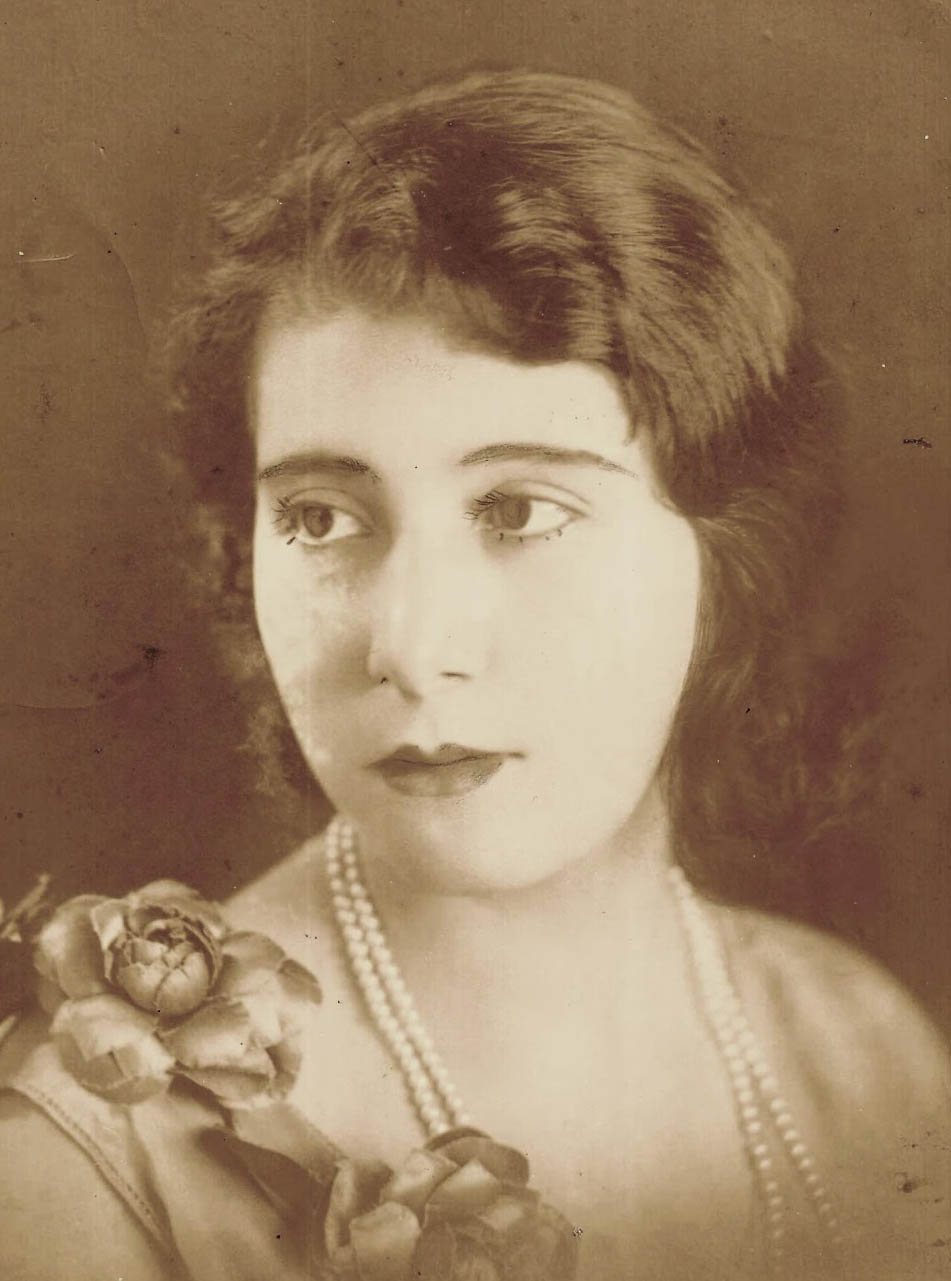
Argentina Díaz Lozano

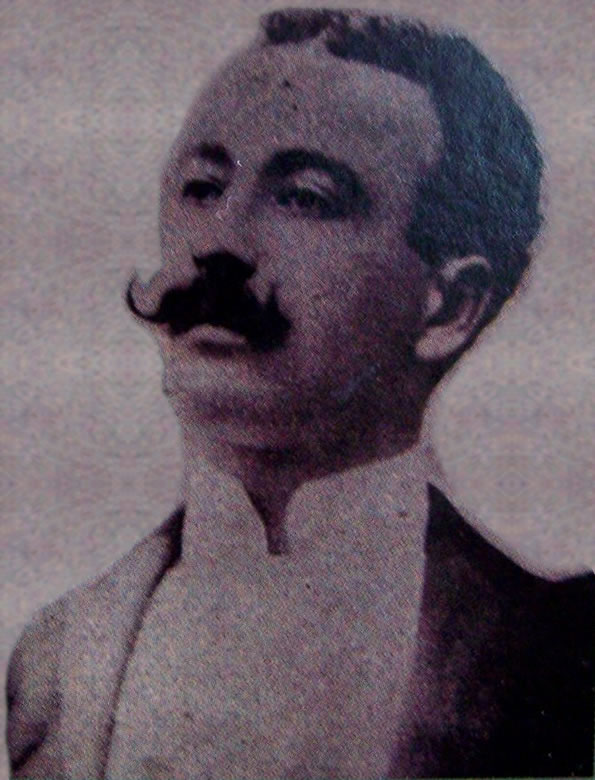
Juan Ramon Molina

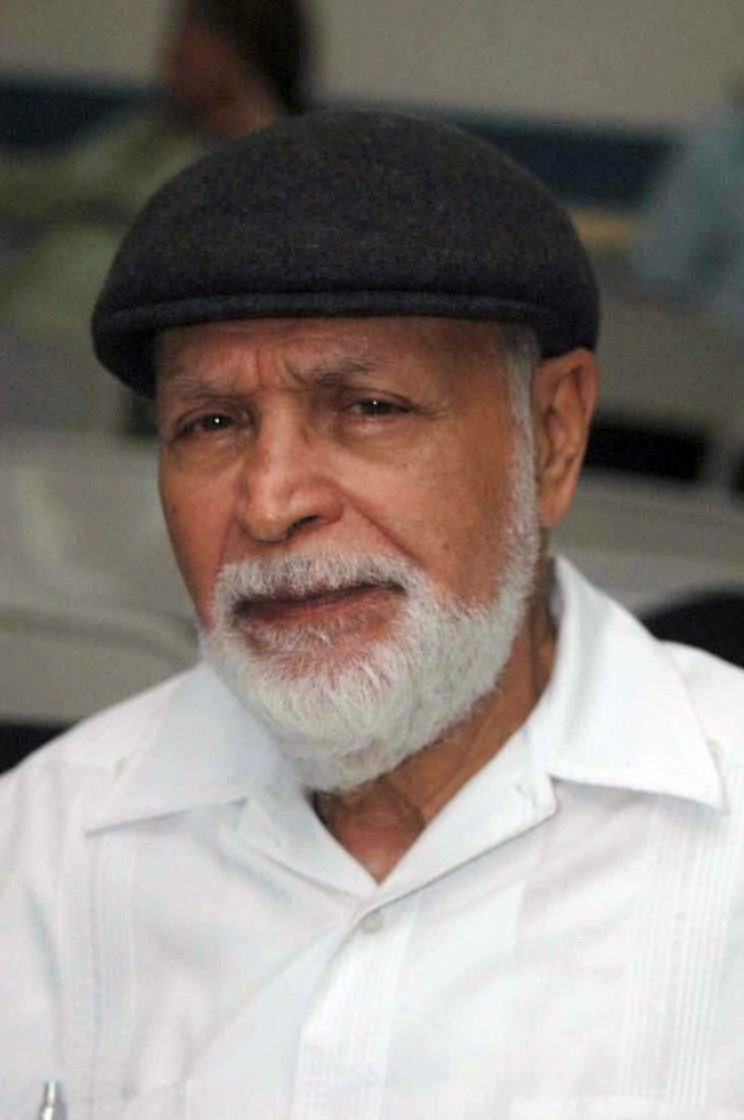
Roberto Sosa

== Arts and Media ==
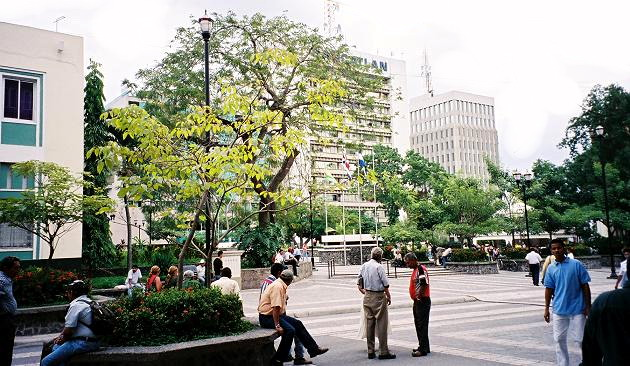
Central Park in San Pedro Sula, where several cultural events take place throughout the year.

The first printing press was brought to Honduras by General Francisco Morazán from Guatemala. He used it to begin publication in 1830 of The Gazette of the government. Bulletins and informative weekly papers soon followed.

In 1831, the newspaper known as The Beam was born, which had a short duration. At the end of the 19th century, The Chronicle commenced publication; next came The Newspaper of Honduras and The People (an official newspaper of the Honduran Liberal Party, which later ceased publication).

Honduras has a good number of newspapers and magazines, through which the Honduran people stay well informed. Of these the oldest is La Prensa, founded on October 26, 1964 in San Pedro Sula. El Tiempo was in publication from 1970 to 2015. In the capital city of Tegucigalpa, The Tribune and later The Herald appeared in the mid 1970s.

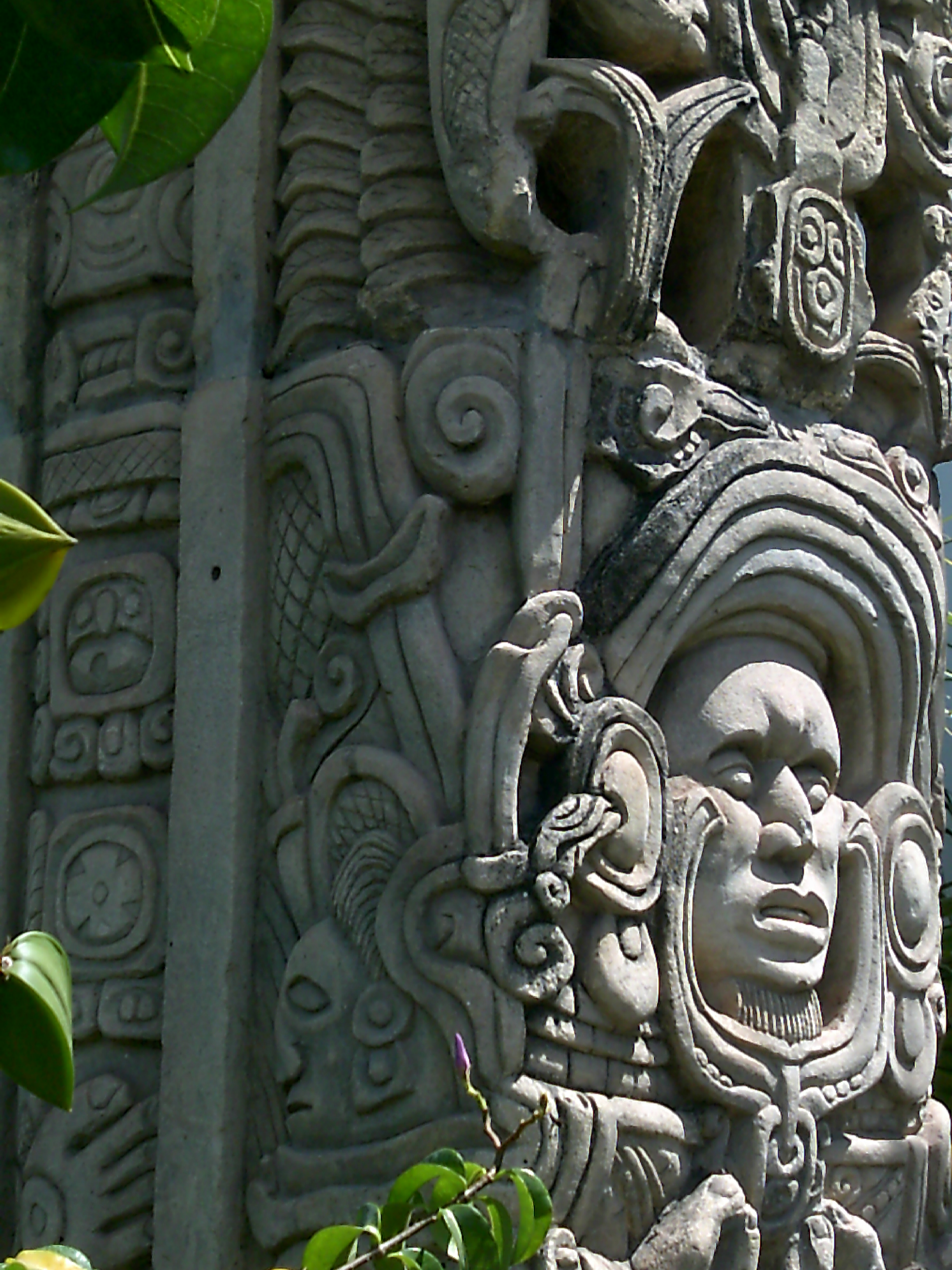
Mayan stellae.

With the Internet came Proceso Digital and the English weekly paper Honduras This Week. Recently sports magazines such as AS and Diez have appeared, with an emphasis on association football.

Television was introduced in Honduras in 1959 with the arrival of channel 5. Today there are various channels produced in Honduras.

With the arrival of the cable system, Hondurans have the opportunity to watch programs from round the world. The cultural impact of these programs remains to be seen.

Radio also has contributed to the cultural development of Honduras. Major players include Radio America and HRN, a member of the National System of Broadcasting Stations.

=== Theatre ===
Theatrical performances in Honduras date from the colonial period, they began in the 16th century, the first theatrical performance in Honduras was held in the year 1750, outdoors, in the city of Comayagua, the play represented was the Devil Cojuelo. In 1915 the Manuel Bonilla National Theater was founded. Theatrical training centers in Honduras are as follows:

- National Theater School
- La Fragua Theater Performing Arts Training Center (CC-ARTES) San Pedro Sula Art Department
- National Autonomous University of Honduras (UNAH) Art Department
- General Francisco Morazán National Pedagogical University (UPNGFM)
- Bonsai Theater Group in Puerto Cortés (they filmed the first short film of the most important port in Central America)
- José Francisco Saybe Theater - San Pedro Sula

=== Cinema ===
The first Honduran professional film director was Sami Kafati, he studied cinematography in Rome in the 1960s. His first cinematographic work was the experimental film Mi Amigo Ángel, produced in 1962 and is the first film in the cinematography of Honduras.

Other national productions are "No Land Without Owner" (1984-1996), a fictional feature film by Sami Kafati. Currently, the playwrights Hispano Durón Gómez, Mario Jaén, among others, stand out.

Some of the films produced in Honduras more recently are the following:

- "Anita, the insect hunter", produced by Hispano Durón,
- "Amor y frijoles" by Guacamaya Films in 2009,
- "Midnight Souls", (2001) by Juan Carlos Fanconi,
- "The Strange Body", by José A. Olay,
- "El Reyecito", by Fosi Bendeck,
- "High Risk", by René Pauck,
- "Voice of Angel", by Francisco Andino,
- "Side", by Esau Adonai,
- "The Last Kidnapping", by José A. Olay, starring Marianela Ibarra, Nelyi Larice, Glen Lopez, Mario Sarmientos
- "Nos Vale Verga" by Regina Águila.
- "Unos Pocos con Valor" (The Birds of Bethlehem) by Mario Berrios, Produced by Ismael Bevilacqua, directed by Douglas Martin (2010)
- "Who pays the bill" by Guacamaya Films (2013) with the performance of Jorge Flores, Nelyi Larice, Ozcar Izacas, Sandra Ochoa, Maritza Perdomo, Anuar Vindel
- "El Xendra" by Juan Carlo Fanconi (2012)
- "A place in the Caribbean" by Juan Carlo Fanconi (2017)

Honduran cinema has had a boom in the last decade, the growth of filmmakers and the support by institutions and private companies for competitions has motivated young students of communications-related careers to create their own short films, documentary shorts and documentaries. The Icaro Festival is the most important international film festival in Central America and the Caribbean.

== Cuisine ==
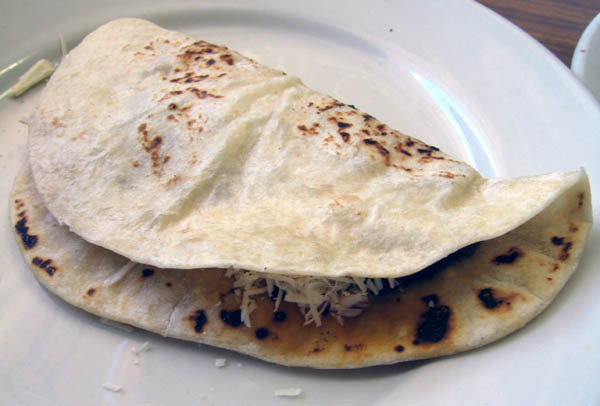
The baleada is a popular Honduran fast food dish.

Honduras has a variety of traditional dishes: The baleada is one of the most representative dishes of Honduran Gastronomy. It is basically composed; for a flour tortilla, which is folded and filled with fried beans, dry cheese and cream butter. Others add to it; roast meat or scrambled eggs to taste, sometimes avocado or chorizo is also added but with any of these ingredients it is very delicious. In addition to the baleadas, they are also popular: Roast beef with chimol, chicken in corn rice, fried fish with pickled onion, and the typical Garífuna dish that is fish fried in coconut oil.

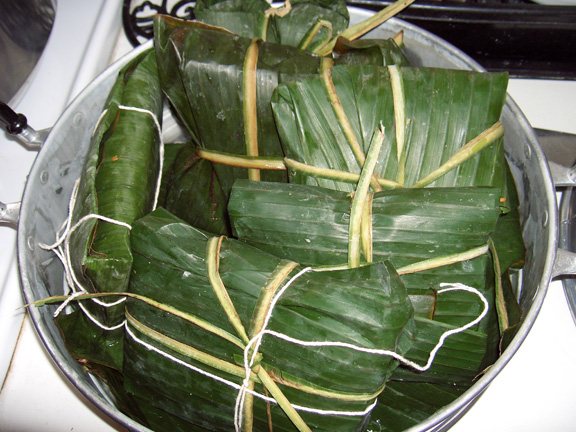
The nacatamal a prehispanic dish widely consumed in Honduras.

There is another very popular food called macheteada, which is a sugary flour dough frying with three slits, hence its name macheteados. The slices with meat or chicken are also very popular in Honduras and chicken with slices is better known as chicken chuco by Hondurans and is sold in many corners as well as the baleadas and people make them homemade and sell them and usually they It goes very well.

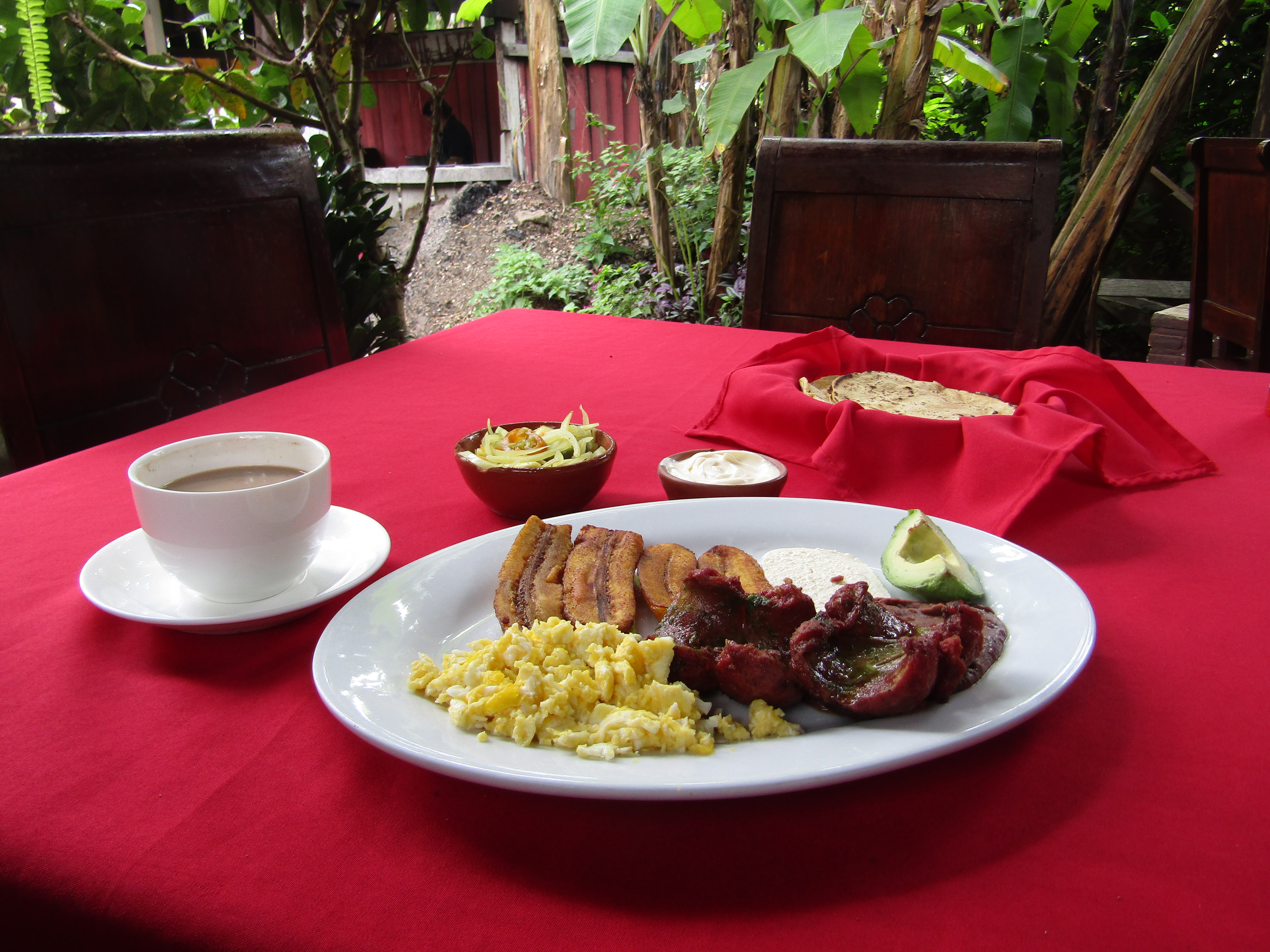
Typical Honduran breakfast.

Other dishes are montucas, enchiladas, corn nacatamales, "tripe" or tripe soup and an abundant selection of tropical fruits such as: mango, papaya, pineapple, plum, sapotes and passion fruit (maracuyá). Grilled meat, pork and chicken chops are also frequently prepared with tortillas, red beans, rice and, of course, fried plantains.

In coastal areas and in the Bay Islands, seafood is prepared in various ways and some dishes are prepared with coconut. The tourist areas have restaurants with international cuisine and American-style dishes.

== Religion ==
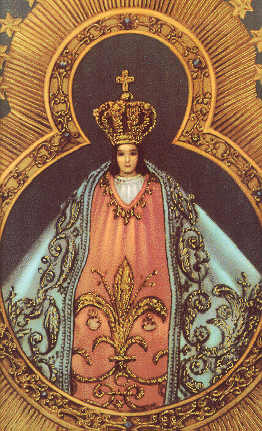
The Virgin of Suyapa

Honduras enjoys freedom of worship. Hondurans are predominantly Christians with half of the country being Catholic and has an increasing number of its population practicing different forms of evangelicalism. Before the conquest of Honduras in the national territory, each ethnic group had its own religion and its own gods, they were polytheistic and animistic religions, among them the Mayan Religion stands out, as well as the Chorotega Religion, the Lenca Religion and the Pech Religion.

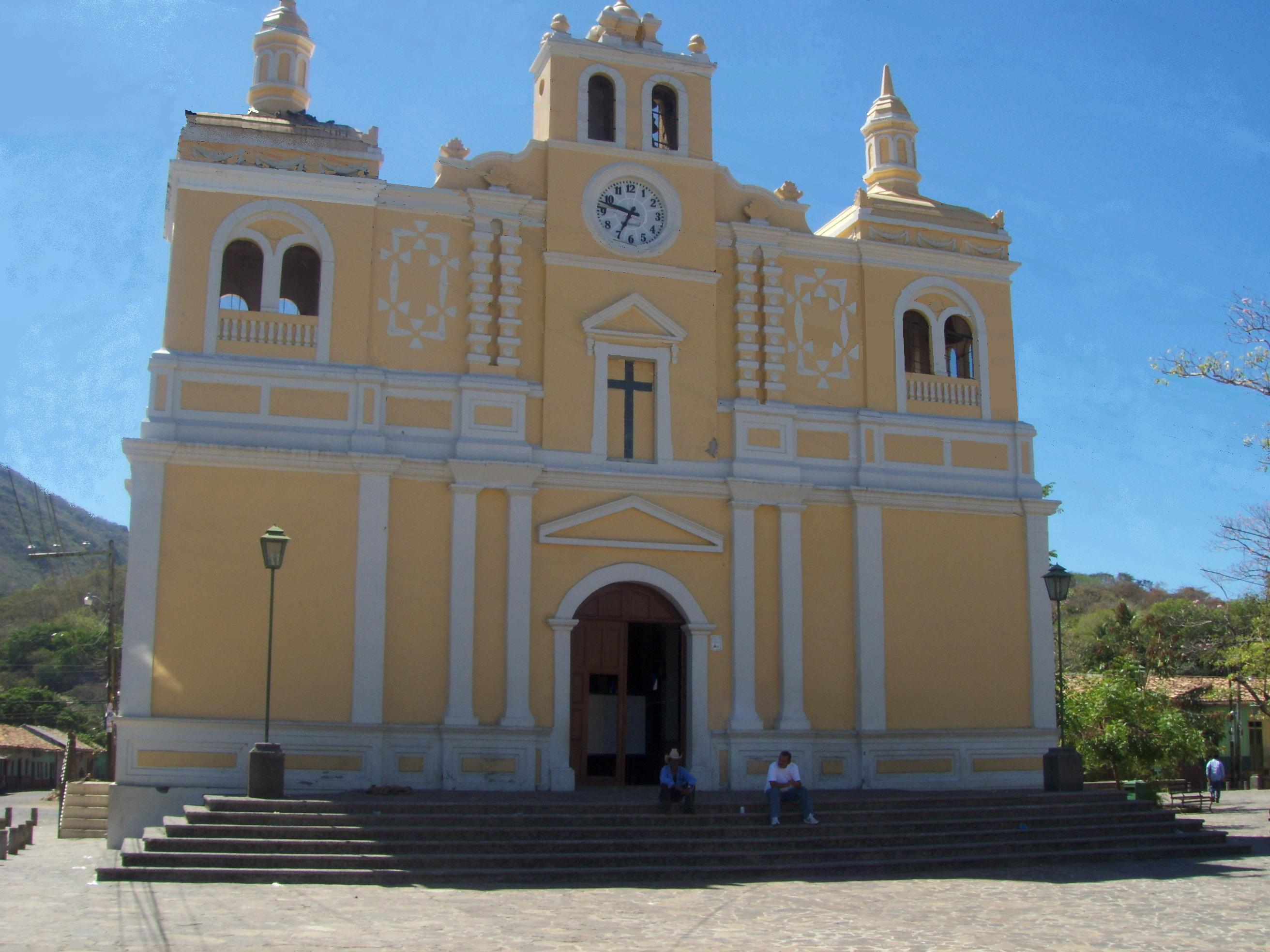
A Roman Catholic cathedral in Amapala.

During colonial times, Christianity and some African religions such as the Garífuna Dugú religion were introduced to Honduras, which is a mixture of African, Christian (Catholic) and indigenous beliefs. Honduras was the country where the second Catholic Mass was celebrated in continental America. This was held on August 14, 1502, in Punta Caxinas, two weeks after the discovery of Honduras by Christopher Columbus. Since then, the Spanish were in charge of instilling the Christian faith among the natives of Honduras.

After the independence of Honduras in 1821 and in the first constitution of the country promulgated on December 11, 1825, Honduras is declared a secular state, this supposes the null interference of any organization or religious confession in the government of the same, either in the executive, the legislative or the judicial.

In recent years, both the Catholic Church and Protestant churches have experienced significant growth in terms of the number of committed parishioners and communicate with the new mass media, have television channels, radio stations, newspapers, schools, colleges, universities and Internet pages.

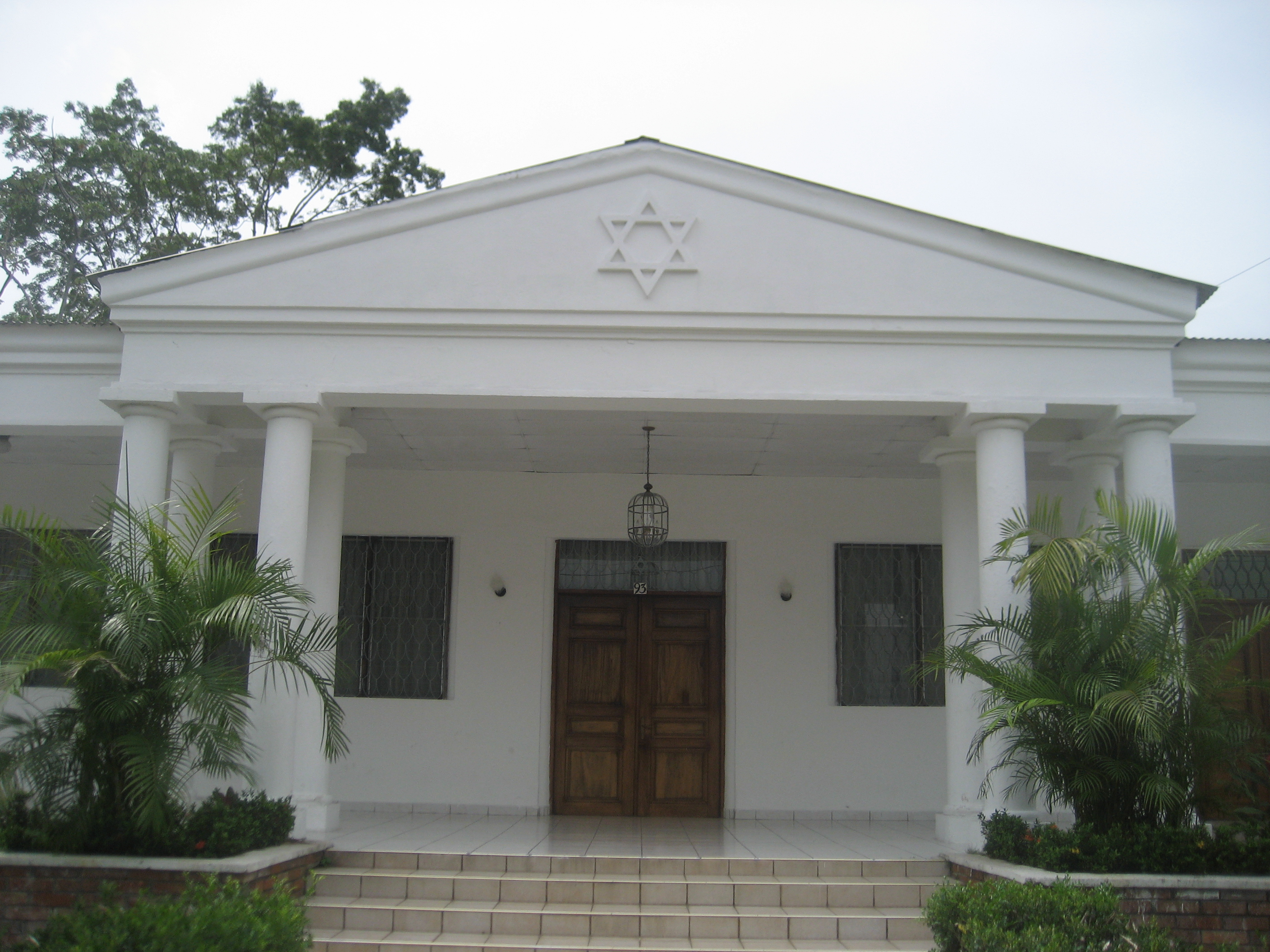
Maguen David sinagoge in San Pedro Sula, one of the places of the Honduran Jewish community.

In addition to these religions, there are smaller-scale groups in Honduras that profess other religions, such as: Islam, Judaism, and members of the Rastafari movement among others.

Today a low percentage of the population is considered atheist, another low percentage of Hondurans consider themselves agnostic, 50% of the believers are Catholic and an important part of the autochthonous ethnic groups conserve their original religion.

Tribal and Indigenous Culture and Struggles within Honduras

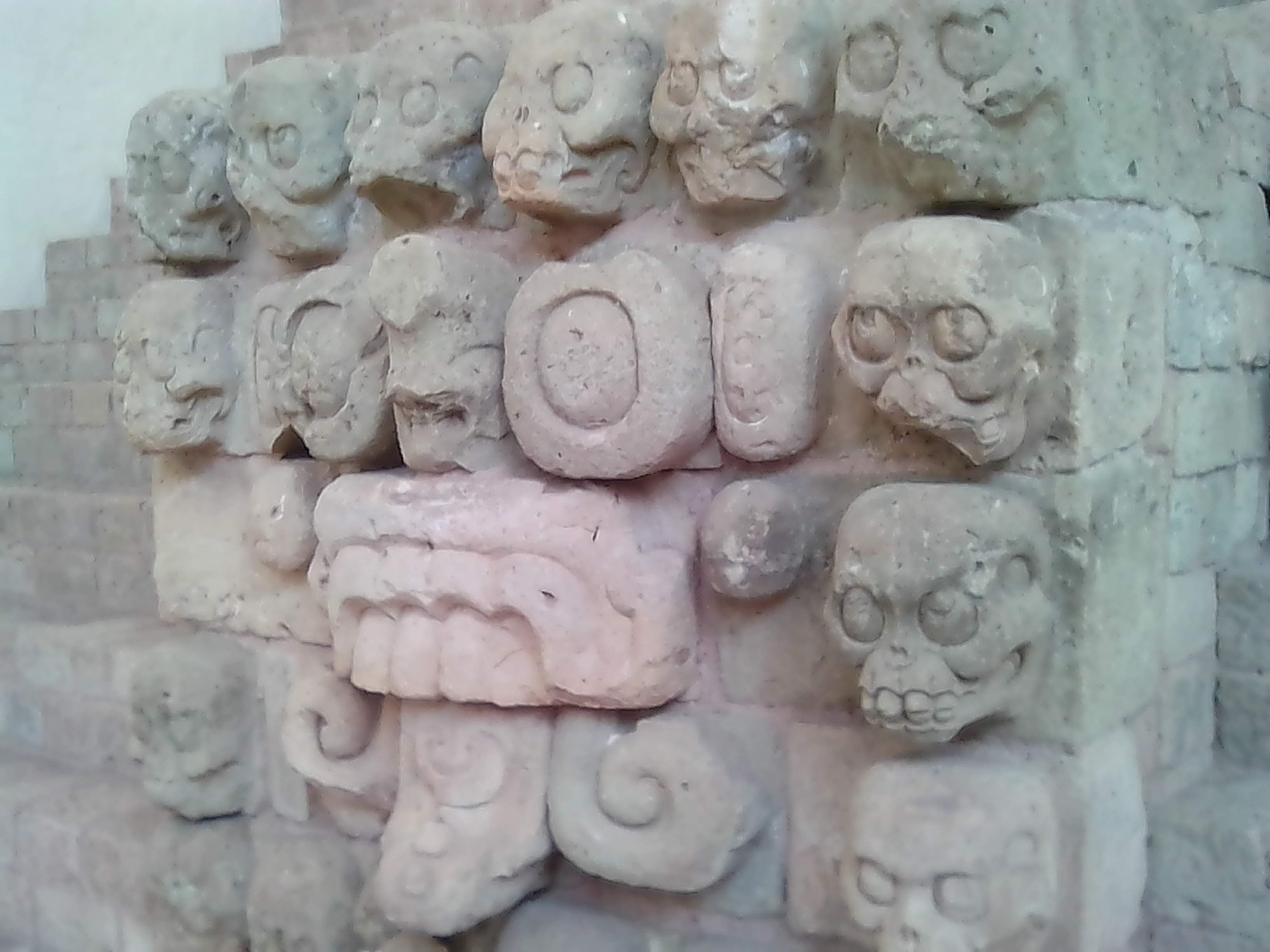
Mayan rain god Chaac representation at the Mayan Sculpture Museum in Copán.

There are several different tribes located in the country of Honduras known as the Lenca, Miskitu, Tawahka, Pech, Maya Chortis, Xicaques, and many more. Each tribe has its own history, cultural traditions, and livelihood within Honduras. These indigenous people fight environmental justice-related issues daily throughout their lives. Many indigenous people face the risk of eventually being forced to change their culture and historical practices within their own land to adopt the new modern-day culture of Honduras. Hence, there is growing popularity in the belief that indigenous people stand in the way of the country’s national development.

The Lenca tribe, for example, is one of the largest in the country and has a population of around 100,000 and around 612 different Lenca communities. The majority of these communities are located in areas that are home to rough, mountainous terrain and are extremely difficult to reach. For those living in said conditions, essential daily tasks can be hard to complete in some locations as there is no roadway, running water, or even transportation. The Lenca tribe was unable to keep their language strong despite being somewhat isolated from the rest of the country. Income is made from selling coffee, weaving, and pottery; with their location, not a lot of money is made each day. The Lenca people have a true connection with the rivers, land, and nature. Non-indigenous people of Honduras pushed the Lenca people to live in the mountains, causing a lot of resistance between the two groups.

Along with the remote living conditions, hydroelectric facilities and mining are becoming popular in Lenca’s territory. The Lenca are ready to fight, even if it means losing their lives and some already have. Young Lenca people face challenges such as finding employment as there is little way of making a consistent income within most locations that the Lenca tribe inhabits. Instead, they must leave and likely will find themselves working in the military. The Lenca tribe is striving to find any possible solution to these problems and wants young Lenca people to be able to stay within their communities. There are major injustices occurring within the Lenca’s people and land. With these injustices, a complex multitude of issues arise. These problems all tie together and include isolation, unemployment, loss of aspects of their culture such as their own native language and land, and mining/other environmental hazards.

Hydroelectric, dams, and mining are all becoming very common in Honduras and tend to be located on tribal or indigenous lands. For instance, a damn was set to be constructed on the Gualcarque River. This river happened to be a very important and culturally significant river to the Lenca people and anyone surrounding that area. This dam’s main purpose would be to fuel hydroelectricity and mining for gold, silver, iron, and other valuable materials. A law was passed known generally as the “2013 mining law” that allowed open-pit mines and the use of harmful substances such as cyanide which is a threat to both the environment and human health. The law also required that the inhabitants of the land approve of the mining operations. However, the law often backfires and violent threats are used frequently as tactics to gain approval for the new construction of a mine or dam. Resistance often occurs with the Lenca tribe combined with other groups however it can become very dangerous even if the resistance is represented by means of a peaceful protest. The Honduran government has been present at these peaceful protests and often, violence such as shootings and other dangerous acts are at risk for breaking out.

In 2009, the Honduran government underwent a military coup d'état. During this event, mass corruption occurred and individuals from marginalized groups such as those from Lenca and Garifuna tribes were restored to the streets. It has been an uphill battle for all in this position since then. Honduras still remains in a coup-like atmosphere with electoral frauds, increased deaths, a large migration of its people, activists being arrested and killed, and so on. Honduras has one of the highest murder rates of activists and these people face a massive amount of danger each day. The organization known as the Civil Council of Popular and Indigenous Organizations of Honduras (COPINH) plays a great role in activism towards these issues that the Lenca tribe and others face. Members of the COPINH group, such as Thomas Garcia, have been shot and killed during these protests against building dams and mining. The Miskitu tribe sums up around 5% of the indigenous population within the country of Honduras and is very large.

Similar to the Lenca tribe, these people are often marginalized and do not have proper access to healthcare, or educational opportunities. Miskitu people are extremely hard workers which can cause them many health problems. In addition, agriculture, being part of nature and the land is a major part of their traditions and ways of living. These people often face problems that arise from the Honduran government forcing them from their land, thus making them cut ties with the agricultural roots and values of their own land. Over a period of many years, tropical rainforests along the Caribbean coast, home to much of the Miskitu tribe as well as others, have been experiencing issues with groups such as miners, ranchers, and other illegal groups and people wrongfully utilizing the tribal land. As of 2009, the Honduras government has finally handed over a large chunk of land to the Miskitu people however, a major plan to construct a dam known as the Patuca 3 hydroelectric project was funded in the main cultural lands of the Miskitu and other tribes. As soon as this land was handed over, the government also began pestering these tribes about potential gas and oil uses within the land.

There are 41+ dam constructions which are all occurring in an area of tribal land. There have been several meetings between the tribes including the Tulupanes, Pech, Miskito, Maya-Chortis, Lenca, and Garifuna. The government of Honduras continues to jeopardize these tribal communities and utilize rivers that hold a huge link to the tribe's traditions, culture, and roots. With such resistance between indigenous peoples and the government, there is a popular belief that indigenous people are against any further development of their land. When, in reality, indigenous people are open to changes and modifications within their land if the choice is made by their own people. This strong willed-attitude and belief are held as if the changes to the land occur as a decision made within the tribe then they will not lose connection with the land and can continue on with their way of life. All members of the tribes are ready to fight for the rights and title of their land if the construction of dams becomes an official plan.

Despite many tribes such as Garifuna having a long history with their land and their presence in Honduras, their and other tribes' lands are sometimes deemed to be practically non-existent. Not only is their land within Honduras also experiencing issues with the construction of dams and or mining locations but also with recent tourism that is steadily increasing. With tourism becoming popular, the Garifuna face an increased risk of losing their land, as do many other tribes of Honduras. Some are promised employment within this new wave of tourism however, their culture is also becoming more visible to others, making it not as sacred. In addition, because of this increase in tourism, new developers have begun stomping the lands of the Garifuna and constructing upon their land (large resorts for tourists, etc), taking their land, and ripping their culture away from them. There are massive conflicts over the land being utilized in this way.

In recent years, indigenous tribe members are still experiencing discrimination and a true lack of human rights toward their culture, land, and people. In 2016, 600+ activists gathered in the capital of Honduras known as Tegucigalpa. The event was known as the Summit for Indigenous and Peasant Communities in the Struggle Against Extractivism and was hosted by the Platform of Social and Popular Movement of Honduras. Struggles were shared by each tribe such as the problem of logging within the Tolupane tribes' land, extreme dam construction, and mining faced by the Lenca, members of the Garifuna tribe facing increased tourism and drilling within their lands, and so on. The groups combined in an effort to support one another and design resistance strategies together. Extraction methods are increasing rapidly and are often targeted to occur within indigenous people’s land instead of other prime locations. Activists are rising to promote these issues and improvements are being made but it will take a great deal of time to see them.

== See also ==
- Public holidays in Honduras
- Virgin of Suyapa, perhaps Honduras' most popular religious image
- Lluvia de Peces, rain of fish phenomenon
- La Ceiba Carnival
- Miss Honduras
- Human rights in Honduras
