= Javier Monthiel =

Honduran singer (born 1967)

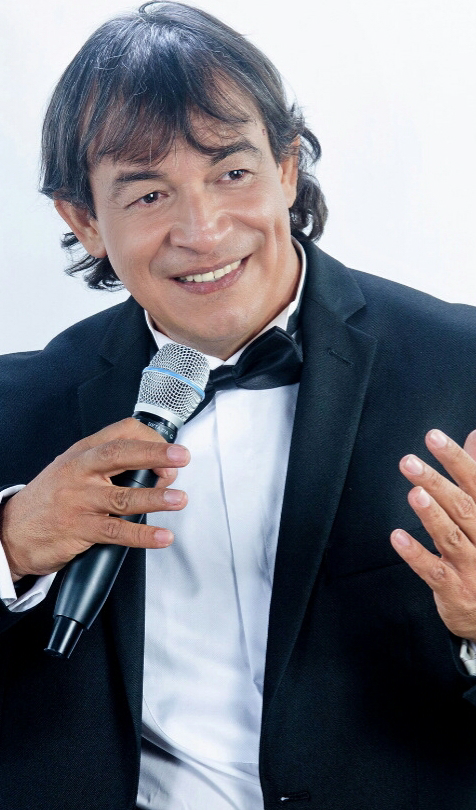
- Born: Jose Javier Pérez Ramirez; April 11, 1967 (age 59); Ocotepeque, Ocotepeque, Honduras
- Occupations: Singer, composer, producer, businessman and politician
- Parent(s): Antonio Leiva; Tereza de Jesús Ramirez
- Musical career
- Genres: romantic balad · merengue · cumbia · rock balad · bachata
- Instruments: Vocals, guitar on occasion
- Years active: 1990–present
- Label: J.M. Productions International

Signature
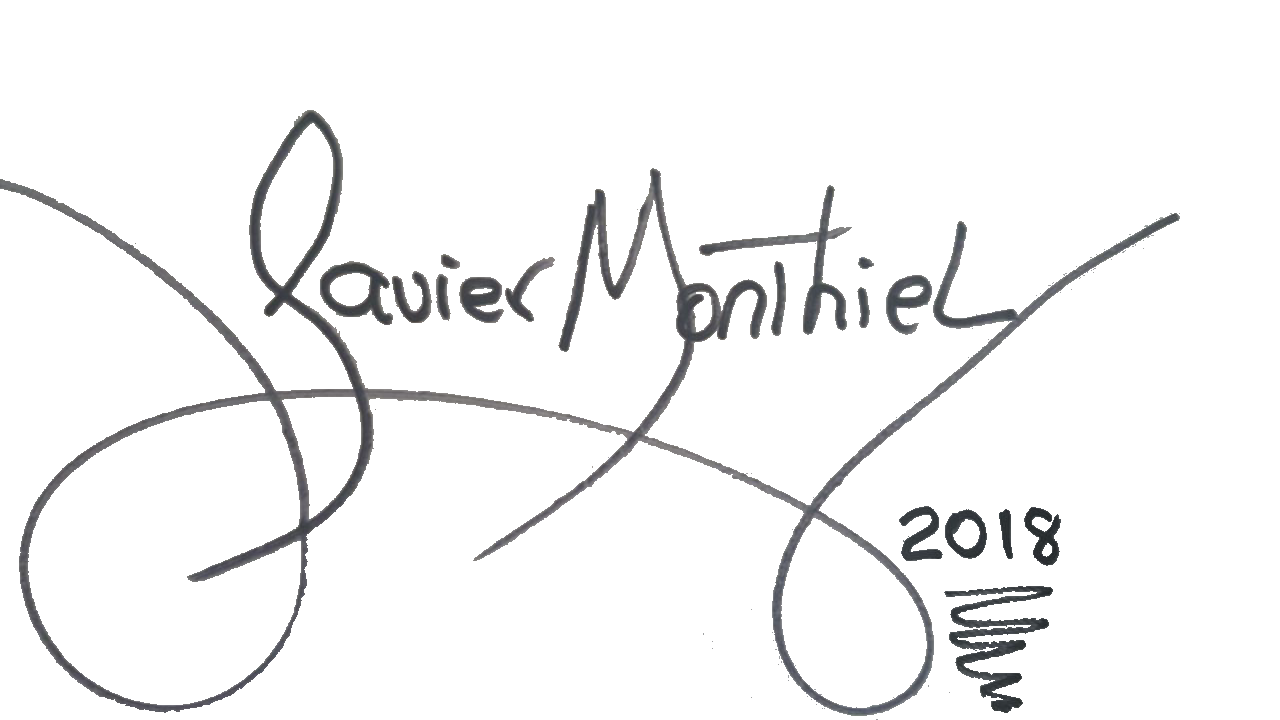

Jose Javier Pérez Ramirez (born April 11, 1967), better known by his stage name Javier Monthiel, is a Honduran singer, composer and Honduran producer. He is one of the most outstanding artists in his country. Among his original works are Así es mi tierra, Es Honduras, Mujeres Latinas, Amiga and Más allá del Corazón, songs that among others have allowed him to reach international stages and to be currently one of the most important figures of Honduran music.

== Biography ==
Javier Monthiel was born on April 11, 1967, in Ocotepeque, son of Antonio Leiva and Tereza de Jesús Ramirez. Javier inherited his musical aptitude from his father, who was a Honduran saxophonist and musician by profession. However, Javier did not meet his father until he was twelve years old and never spent much time with him. More influential in his life was his stepfather Valentín Pérez, a railway worker, whom Javier credits with having taught him honesty, humility and the value of hard work. Javier began to sing at the school, initially at Soledad Fernández Cruz and then at the Dionisio de Herrera institute in San Pedro Sula, where in 1984 he won the Summer Song Festival championship in Tela, Atlántida in 1984.

After Javier finished school in 1985, he worked at the national telecommunications company, Hondutel. During this time he performed at the amateur level and matured as a composer. In 1990, Javier Monthiel also entered the Universidad Nacional Autónoma de Honduras, where he obtained a degree in Business administration in 1998. In 1990 he also launched his professional career with the release of his first album produced in the Republic of El Salvador. This album included two original works, Tus Ojos Son and Culpables Rápido. These songs quickly became known within the romantic genre in Honduras.

Recognized in Honduras by 1992, Javier Monthiel signed an artistic contract with a soft drink bottling company to perform in a series of concerts together with other artists from Latin America. During this tour, Javier shared the stage acting alternately with the puertorriqueño Chayanne in soccer stadiums in Honduras and Guatemala. After these successful performances, Javier Monthiel opened the concerts of the Mexican Yuri, the Argentinian Enanitos Verdes and Soda Stereo and the Venezuelan Ricardo Montaner among others. He subsequently alternated concerts with other international artists and opened presentations at important artistic and cultural events in Honduras, such as beauty pageants and the OTI Festival.

In 1995 Javier Monthiel began presentations that would propel him to become one of the best-known artists in the country. That year he was invited to sing the Honduran National Anthem at the opening of the World Cup competitions in San Pedro Sula. This was followed by presentations at the Estadio Azteca in Mexico City, the Miami Orange Bowl at Miami, the Robert F. Kennedy Memorial Stadium at Washington, D.C., Estadio Revolución (now Estadio Rommel Fernández) in the city of Panama and Estadio Cuscatlán in El Salvador among others. Then, a year later, he was called to sing the National Anthem of Honduras for games of the Honduras national team when it played in the 1998 FIFA World Cup in France.

Today Javier Monthiel has 15 album productions, a wide variety of video musical clips produced in national and international stages, and a whole range of promotional material of international quality. These are representative of the discography and videography of this Central American artist, and documentaries in which he has participated.

== Recognitions and awards ==
Year	Award or Recognition
1991	New Artist of the Year
1992	Honduran Artist of the Year
1995	Singer of the Year
1997	Honduran Composer of the Year
2002	Video of the year for the song Amiga
2008	Deserved Tribute in New York
2010	National Lifetime Artistic Achievement Award
2014	Composer of the Year for the song Así es Mi Tierra
2015	International Lifetime Achievement Award in New York; Central American and Caribbean awards
2016	Honduran Composer of the Year
2017	Golden Microphone Award in New York
2018	Fox Music USA Latin Awards - Central American Artist of the Year
2019	Mariscal de la Tarima de Central America
2021	Premios Fox Music USA — Nominated "Best Central American Composer 2022"
2022	International Trajectory Award, XXVII Annual Award Ceremony Premio lo Nuestro Nicaragua 2022
2022	Premios Fox Music USA — "Central American Composer of the Year"

== Original compositions ==
Javier Monthiel's compositions include romantic and merengue songs, and the fusion of both genres.

=== Bachata ===
- Aquella noche
- Como Duele

=== Ballad ===
==== Pop ballad ====
- Tus ojos son

==== Rock ballad ====
- Niños en la calle
- Paz en la ciudad

==== Romantic ballad ====
- Amiga
- Ganas de Tí
- Más Alla del Corazón
- Si Tu No Estas

=== Merengue ===
- Mujeres Latinas esa chica quiere
- Si tu no estas ( versión merengue)

=== Ranchera ===
- Tu Falso Amor
- Canción a Ocotepeque
- Soy El Patrón
- Dicen Por Allí

=== Romantic ===
- Amiga
- Ay mujer
- Cuando entregas amor
- Culpables
- Dime tu
- En el día del amor
- Ganas de ti
- Jamás, jamás
- Mas allá del corazón
- Mi fan número uno
- Mi niña
- Paz en la ciudad
- Si tu no estas
- Tú en Navidad
- Una canción cantaré

=== Fusion rhythms ===
- Así es mi tierra
- Es Honduras
- Al ritmo del gol

== Discography ==
The albums by Javier Monthiel recall the flavor of the land of Honduras and the cultural wealth of its people. Javier Monthiel's entire discography is original work by the artist. His compositions range in genres from romantic ballad, through merengue, cumbia, rock ballad, and bachata.

- 1990 Tus ojos Son
- 1992 Suena guitarra suena
- 1993 Solo sin tí
- 1997 Es Honduras
- 2001 Amiga
- 2002 Más allá del corazón
- 2003 Si tú no estás
- 2005 Mujeres Latinas
- 2006 Esa chica quiere
- 2008 Hay mujer
- 2010 Madrecita del Alma
- 2011 Mi viejo mi Amiga
- 2014 Paz en la ciudad
- 2015 Una canción Cantaré
- 2016 Clásicos Hondureños y Más
- 2017 Aquella noche
- 2019 Paz en la ciudad
- 2021 Tu falso amor, Como duele
- 2022 Cuando cae la lluvia

== Videos ==
- Amiga
- Bananero
- Cantare para Tí
- En El Día del Amor
- Es Honduras
- Esa Chica Quiere
- Ganas de Tí
- Himno Nacional de Honduras
- Honduras Mi Tierra — This work gives recognition to the ethnic groups of Honduras and thereby highlights their cultural values.
- Jamás
- Madrecita del Alma
- Mas Alla del Corazón
- Mi Viejo Mi Amigo
- Mujer
- Mujeres Latinas
- Noche de Luna en La Ceiba
- Si Tu no Estas
- Tú en Navidad
- Una Canción Cantare
- Virgen de Suyapa

== Artists with whom Javier Monthiel has performed ==
Year	Combination	Concert Location
1992	Javier Monthiel and Chayanne	Estadio Francisco Morazán, San Pedro Sula, Honduras
1993	Javier Monthiel and El General	Campo Agas, San Pedro Sula, Honduras
1994	Javier Monthiel and Chayanne	Estadio Nacional Mateo Flores (now named Estadio Doroteo Guamuch Flores), Guatemala
1994	Javier Monthiel and Miguel Mateos	Estadio Chochi Sosa, Tegucigalpa, Honduras
1997	Javier Monthiel and Jorge Muñiz	Special presentation, Estadio Azteca, Mexico D.F.
2002	Javier Monthiel and Ricardo Montaner	Estadio Olímpico Metropolitano, San Pedro Sula, Honduras
2004	Javier Monthiel and Álvaro Torres	Campo Agas, San Pedro Sula, Honduras
2006	Javier Monthiel and Enanitos Verdes	Hotel Copantl, San Pedro Sula, Honduras
2008	Javier Monthiel and Toño Rosario	(United States) In Concert, Washington, D.C., USA
2014	Javier Monthiel and Marco Antonio Solís	Estadio Francisco Morazán, San Pedro Sula, Honduras
2015	Javier Monthiel and Los Horóscopos de Durango	(United States) Orange, New Jersey, USA
2016	Javier Monthiel and Grupo Niche	(United States) Morristown, New Jersey, USA
2017	Javier Monthiel and Álvaro Torres	(United States) Miami, Florida, American Airlines, USA

== See also ==
- Music of Honduras
- Culture of Honduras
- Guillermo Anderson
- Moisés Canelo
