= Theater in Honduras =

Theatrical productions in Honduras are a relatively new phenomenon, with no established theatrical tradition.

== History ==
During the late 18th century, a form of theater known as pastorelas was introduced to Honduras. In 1750, the first theatrical performance in Honduras was Luis Vélez de Guevara's Devil Cojuelo in Comayagua. Despite subsequent productions, a theatrical tradition was not yet established. In 1915 the Manuel Bonilla National Theater was completed, where theater, opera, zarzuela and dance were performed.

== Figures ==
José Trinidad Reyes, founder of the National Autonomous University of Honduras, was a writer of pastorelas and his works were a foundation for theater in Honduras. Ramón Amaya Amador wrote several plays, including The Black Plague, The Chapetones and The Bad Woman, in 1959.

The works of Tito Ochoa, director of the Memories Theater, are still performed. Rafael Murillo Selva's Loubavagu (The Other Far Side) has been performed over a thousand times worldwide. Poet Daniel Laínez wrote Timoteo Amuses in 1946 and A Man of Influence in 1956.

Honduran actors and directors include Fredy David Ponce Rivas, Edy Barahona, Isidro Spain, Francisco Molina, Eleazar Úbeda, Johel Perla, Magda Alvarado, Elisa Logan, Hermes Kings, Dax Marcell, Hermes Zelaya, Edilberto González, Guillermo Fernández QDDG, Luis Joel Rivera, José Ramón Inestroza, Rigoberto Fernández, Mario Jaén, José Luis Recinos, Armando Valeriano, Damario Kings, José Francisco Saybe, Manuel Bonilla, Reiniery Andean, Delmer López, Sandra Herrera, Oscar Lemus, Oscar Zelaya, Oscar Barahona, David Martínez, Tito Estrada, Ybis Zelaya, Lourdes Ochoa, Elena of Larios, Maricela Nolasco, Susan Arteaga, Alba Luz Rogel, Cecilia Peacock, Lucy Ondina, Leonardo Mount of Goose (a mime), Robero Becerra, Roberto Carlo Rivera, Benjamín Safe, Mariela Zavala, Felipe Acosta, Alonzo Baires, Emma Martínez, Jorge Osorto and Javier Suazo.

== Plays ==
Title	Author	Year
Timoteo Amuses	Daniel Laínez	1946
A Man of Influence	Daniel Laínez	1956
The Bad Woman	Ramón Amaya Amador	1959
Seven Grimaces (nine plays)	Candelario Kings	1984
Gift for My Husband	Damario Kings	1992
The Big Guess Escrabajo	Damario Kings	2002
The Gordito	Damario Kings	2005
In the Garden	Luis Joel Rivera	2008
Cleopatra	Johel Perla	2009
In Search of the Man Perfecto	Johel Perla	2012
The Chamanhn	Damario Kings	2013

== Theaters ==
- National Theatre Manuel Bonilla, Tegucigalpa (1915)
- Theatre José Francisco Saybe, San Pedro Sula
- House of Theatre Memories, Tegucigalpa
- Theatre Millenium, Comayagüela
- Theatre Nicolás Avellaneda, Comayagüela
- Theatre Renaissance
- Theatre Reform
- Theatre Father Trill in the UNAH
- Theatre of the Child Cultural Centre (CCI), San Pedro Sula
- Cultural Centre Sampedrano
- Theatre-Academy of Dance SOAM
- Theatre Fragua, El Progreso, Yoro
- Auditorium Zorzales, San Pedro Sula
- School of Musical Application, Alps Colony, San Pedro Sula
- Municipal Auditorium of the Redondel of the Artisans, Tegucigalpa
- Museum of Anthropology and History, San Pedro Sula
- Centre of Arts Sampedrano, San Pedro Sula
- House of Culture of Santa Rosa de Copán
- House of Culture of Lima
- House of Culture of El Progreso
- House of Culture, Atlántida
- Cultural Centre of Spain, Tegucigalpa
- Great Commission Church, San Pedro Sula

== Schools ==
- National School of Dramatic Art (Tegucigalpa)
- Theatre the Fragua (Progress, Yoro)
- Centre of Qualification in Performing Arts (CC-ARTS), San Pedro Sula
- Department of Art, UNAH

== Theater groups ==
- Arteatro
- Theatrical Cafe, San Pedro Sula
- Sampedrano Theatrical Circle
- Ekela Itzá Theatre Company
- Foundation Theatre Walk Real
- Artistic Group Lenin Spanish (GALeC) of Atlántida Department
- Dramatic Group of Tegucigalpa
- Theatrical Group Mask
- Theatrical Group Bamboo
- Group of Theatre Images
- The Mocegada
- The Comics
- Theatre Bethel of Saint José of Ocotepeque Parish
- Proyecto Teatral Futuro, San Pedro Sula
- National System of Culture
- Artistic Society for Children of Áuril, El Progreso
- Theatre Sampedrana, Sula
- Theatre Bay, Atlántida
- Theatre Bonsái, Port Cortés
- Theatre Culture Limeña
- Theatre Culture Limeña, La Lima, Cortés Department
- Theatre of Farándula
- Theatre Lanigi Mua
- Theatre Fragua
- Theatre Mask
- Theatre Seeds, Trinidad, Santa Bárbara
- Theatre Laboratory of Honduras (TELAH)
- Latin Theatre
- Theatre Memories
- Theatre Red Shadow
- Theatre Workshop Tegucigalpa (TTT)
- Ministerio Luz en lo Alto, San Pedro Sula

== See also ==
- Culture of Honduras
- Manuel Bonilla National Theater
- Honduran literature
