= Mario Jaén =

Honduran actor, theatre director, and playwright

- Born: 1957 (age 68–69)
- Occupations: Actor, theatre director, playwright
- Known for: Role in Caligula (IV Central American Theatre Festival, 1996); work with Teatro Taller Tegucigalpa

Mario Jaén (born 1957) is a Honduran actor, theatre director, and playwright who is linked with the independent theatre scene in Tegucigalpa. He played a major role in the development of Honduran theatre in the late 20th century based on collective creation and politically engaged theatre traditions.

Jaén received regional attention in the title role in Albert Camus’s Caligula, part of Honduras’s participation to the IV Central American Theatre Festival. He has also directed touring community productions with Teatro Taller Tegucigalpa (TTT) relating to human-rights and social-justice themes.

== Early life and education ==
Jaén is the son of the Honduran actor Emmanuel Jaén. He studied theatre in Colombia and afterwards took part in theatre practice in Honduras when he returned.

== Career ==
=== Stage acting ===
At the IV Central American Theatre Festival in 1996, Jaén's versatility was lauded in the title role of Caligula for having given the character "life and humanity". The performance Jaén gave as Caligula was considered the best realised part of the production and elicited a strong reaction from the audience.

In El Salvador in July 1999 Jaén performed at a Central American theatre festival as representative of Honduran theatre with the monologue El atravesado, which is based on a work by the Colombian writer Andrés Caicedo.

=== Theatre direction and company work ===
Jaén was influenced by collective creation, campesino theatre, and politically engaged theatre, all of which shaped Honduran theatrical responses to the social conditions of the late 20th century. He is also the co-founder and artistic director of the Teatro Taller Tegucigalpa.

=== Playwriting ===
Jaén was also the writer and director of the play Canícula, part of the programme at Teatro La Fragua, and dealt with water scarcity in southern Honduras and its social consequences.

== Selected works ==
=== Theatre (selected) ===
- Caligula (Albert Camus) – title role, IV Central American Theatre Festival (San Salvador, 1996).
- El atravesado (after Andrés Caicedo) – monologue performance (festival appearance, 1999).
- Ancestras (Hermes Reyes) – touring direction (Teatro Taller Tegucigalpa).
- Canícula – written and directed by Jaén.
