= Education in Honduras =

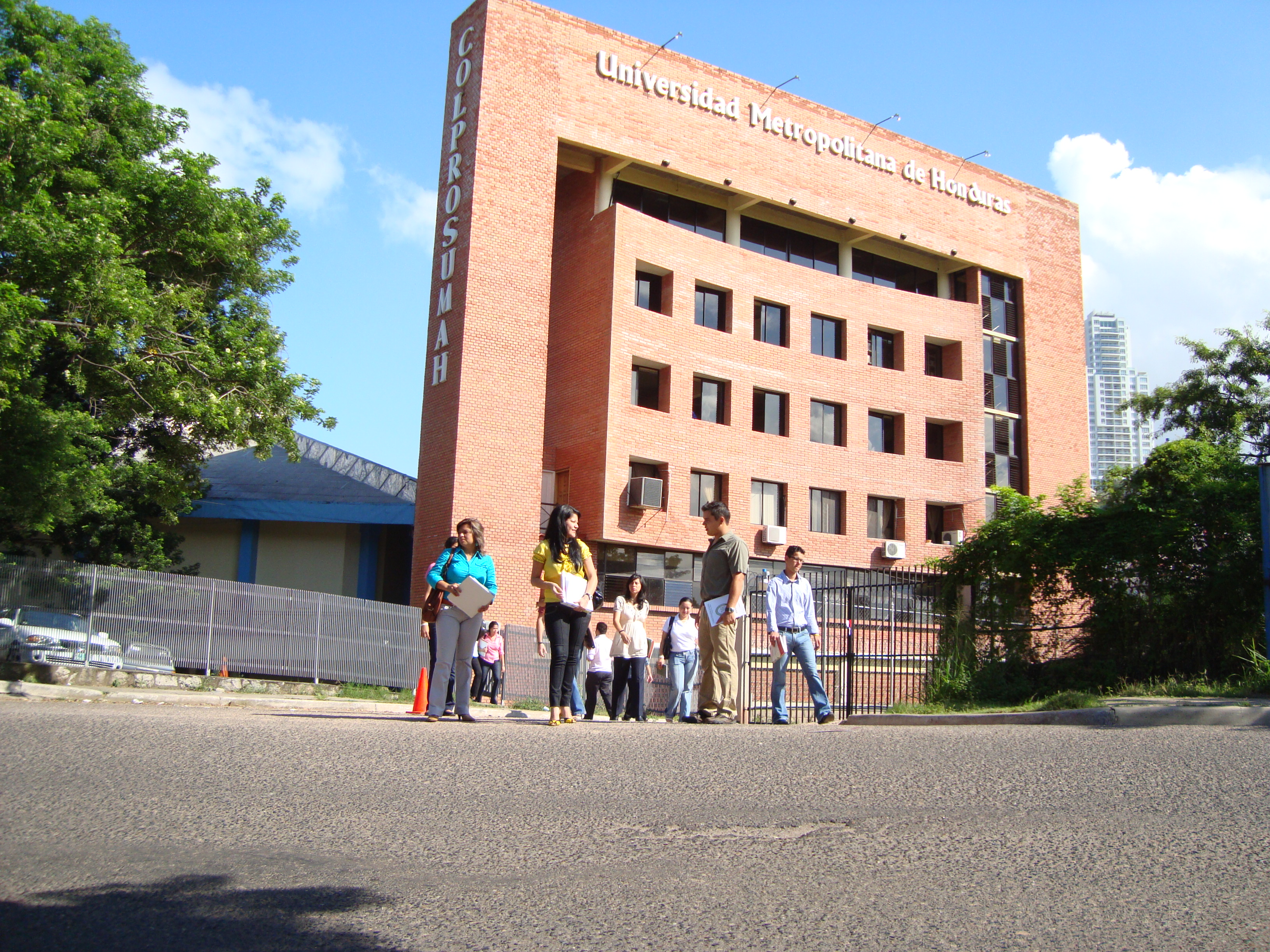
Universidad Metropolitana de Honduras

Education in Honduras is essential to the country of Honduras, for the maintenance, cultivation, and spread of culture and its benefits in Honduran society without discriminating against any particular group. The national education is secular and founded on the essential principles of democracy, inculcating and fomenting strong nationalist sentiments in the students and tying them directly to the economic and social development of the nation. Honduras's 1982 Constitution guarantees the right to education, a right also conveyed through the National Constituent Assembly's Decree 131 and in the official daily publication La Gaceta.

The government has the obligation to develop and provide basic education to its people, and does so by creating administrative and technical organizations answerable directly to the Secretary of State in the Ministry of Public Education. The eradication of illiteracy is currently the primary task of the government, making it the responsibility of all Hondurans to help achieve this goal as well. The government also protects the related rights to research, learn, and teach.

The Human Rights Measurement Initiative (HRMI) finds that Honduras is fulfilling only 58.7% of what it should be fulfilling for the right to education based on the country's level of income. HRMI breaks down the right to education by looking at the rights to both primary education and secondary education. While taking into consideration Honduras' income level, the nation is achieving 69.0% of what should be possible based on its resources (income) for primary education but only 48.4% for secondary education.

== Elementary school ==
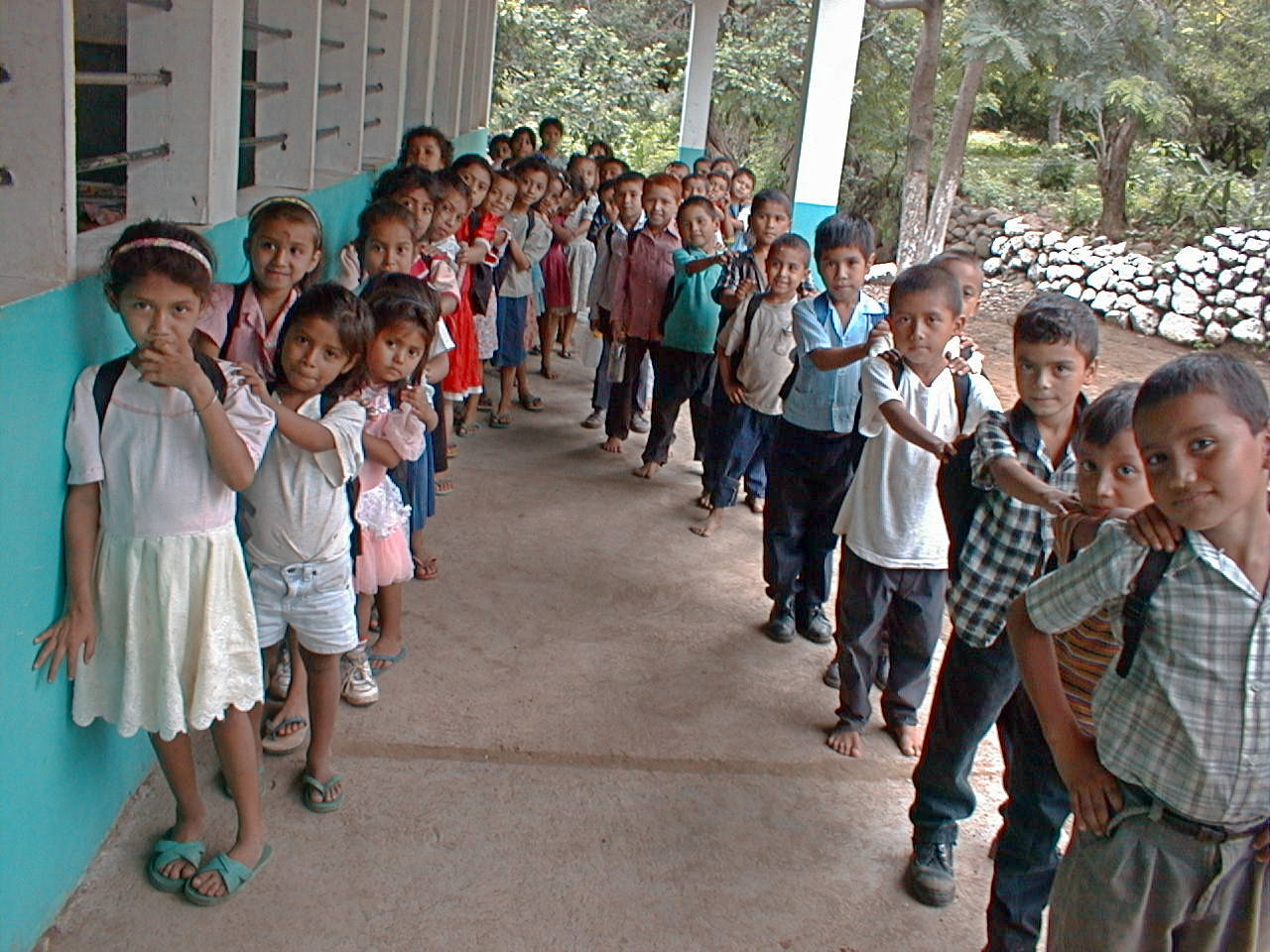
Students lined up outside their new school as provided by the 'Solar.net Village' project — San Ramón, Choluteca, Honduras

Education in Honduras is free for seven years. In 1999, the gross primary enrollment rate was 97.3 percent and the net primary enrollment rate was 85.7 percent. Among working children, an estimated 34 percent complete primary school. A lack of schools prevents many children in Honduras from receiving an education, as do costs such as enrollment fees, school uniforms, and transportation costs. For primary school enrollment, Honduras has a HRMI score of 77.3%.

Until the late 1960s, Honduras had a national education system. Before the reforms of 1957, education was the exclusive privilege of the upper class, who could afford to send their children to private institutions. It was only when the government of Ramón Villeda Morales (1957–63) introduced reforms that led to the establishment of a national public education and ended a school construction program, that education became accessible to the general population.

== Secondary education ==
The secondary school is divided in two sections. Common cycle is the first three years (7th-9th grade) while diversified cycle (10th-12th or 13th grade), provides a bachelor's degree. For secondary school enrollment, Honduras's HRMI score is 51.1%.

== University ==
The National Autonomous University for Honduras is the public university in Honduras. It has campuses in major urban areas across the country.

== Contemporary education ==
In 1998, Hurricane Mitch damaged more than 3,000 schools nationwide. The poor quality of education and the lack of vocational education are other education concerns.

There was no proper educational system before the 1950s. The education reforms of the 1950s meant that by 1957, schools were no longer available to the wealthy, but costs are a problem to this day.

== See also ==
- National Autonomous University of Honduras
- Educational problems In Honduras
- List of schools in Honduras
- List of universities in Honduras
- Shoulder to Shoulder's role in education in Honduras
