= Energy in Africa =

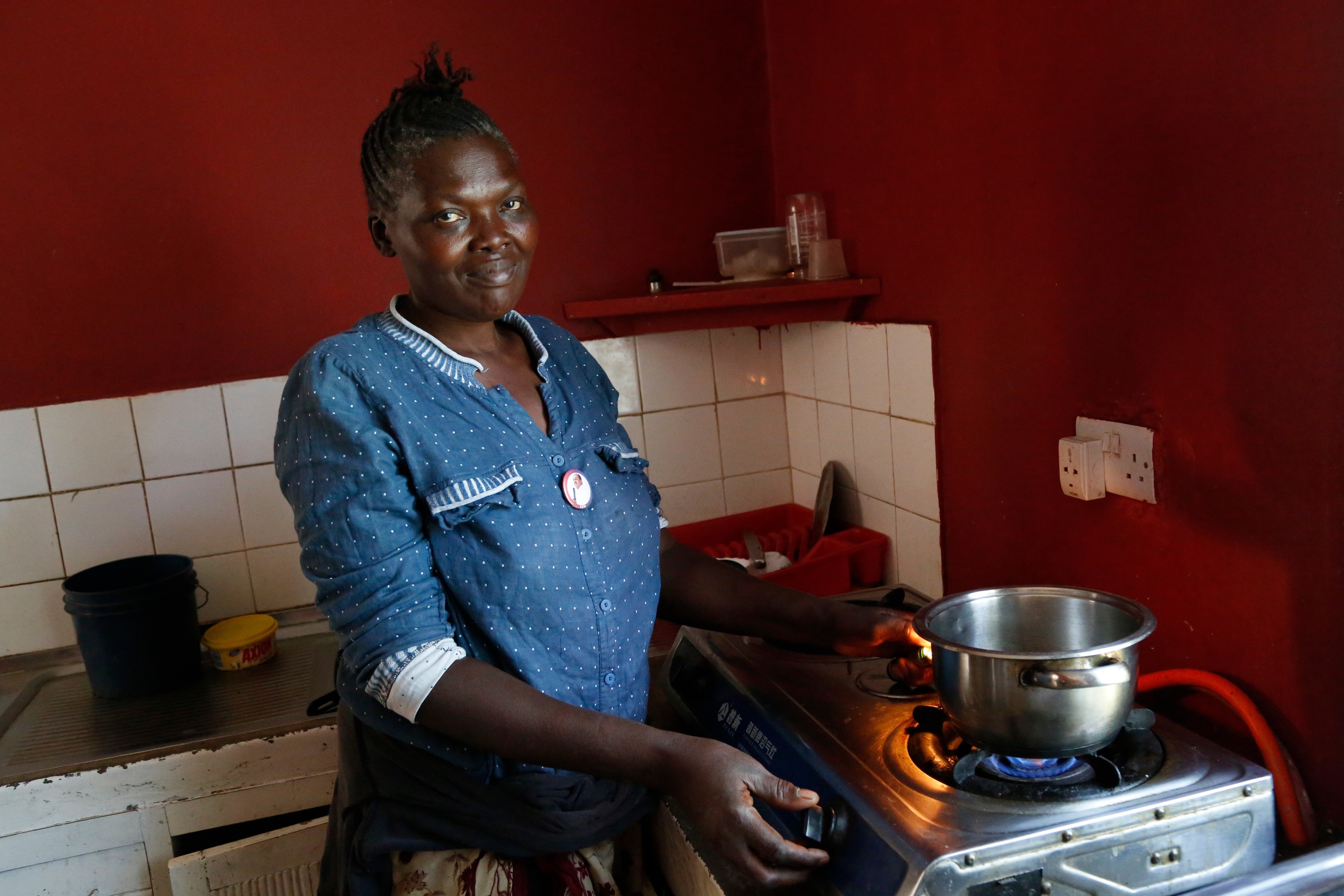
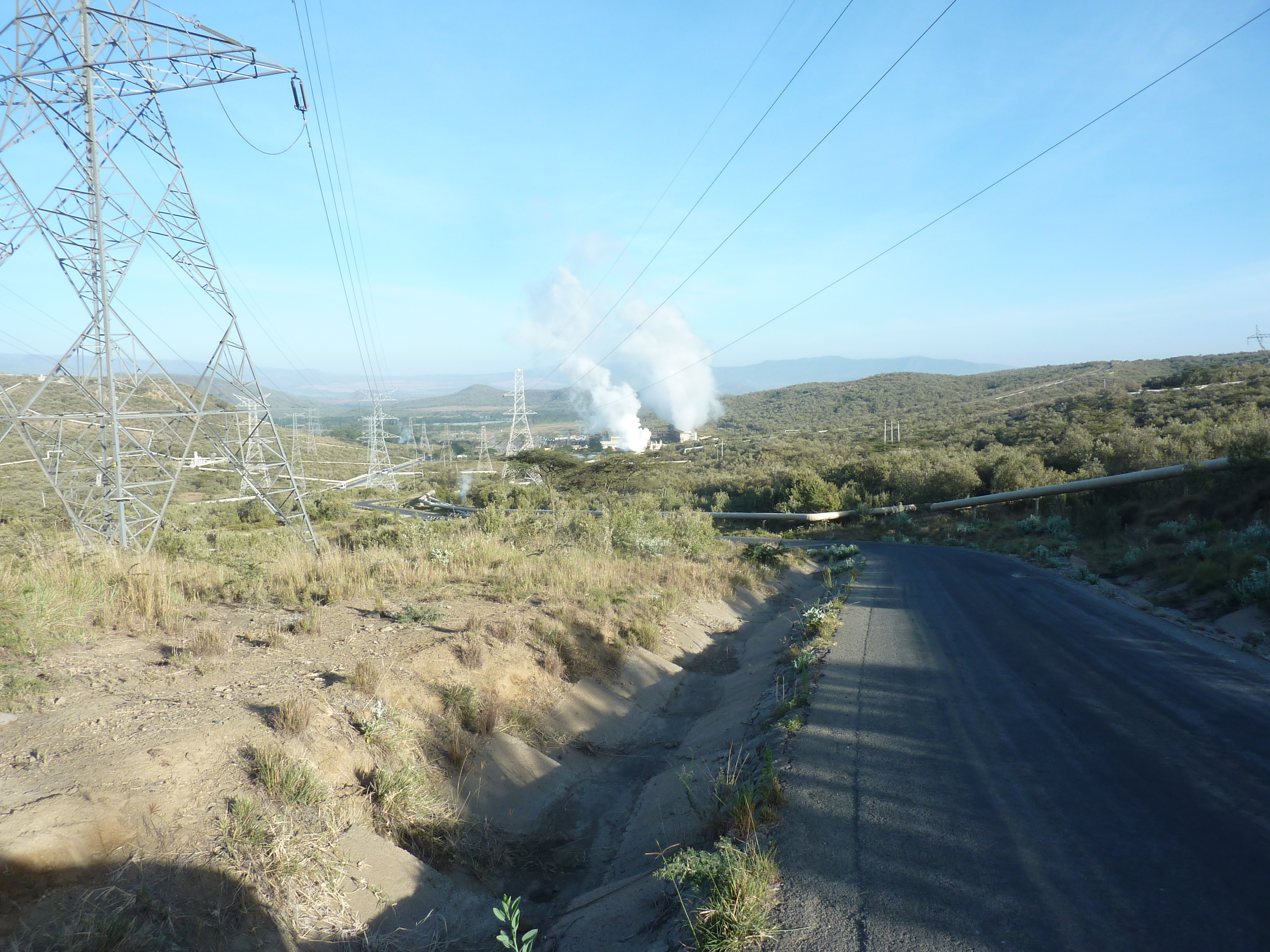
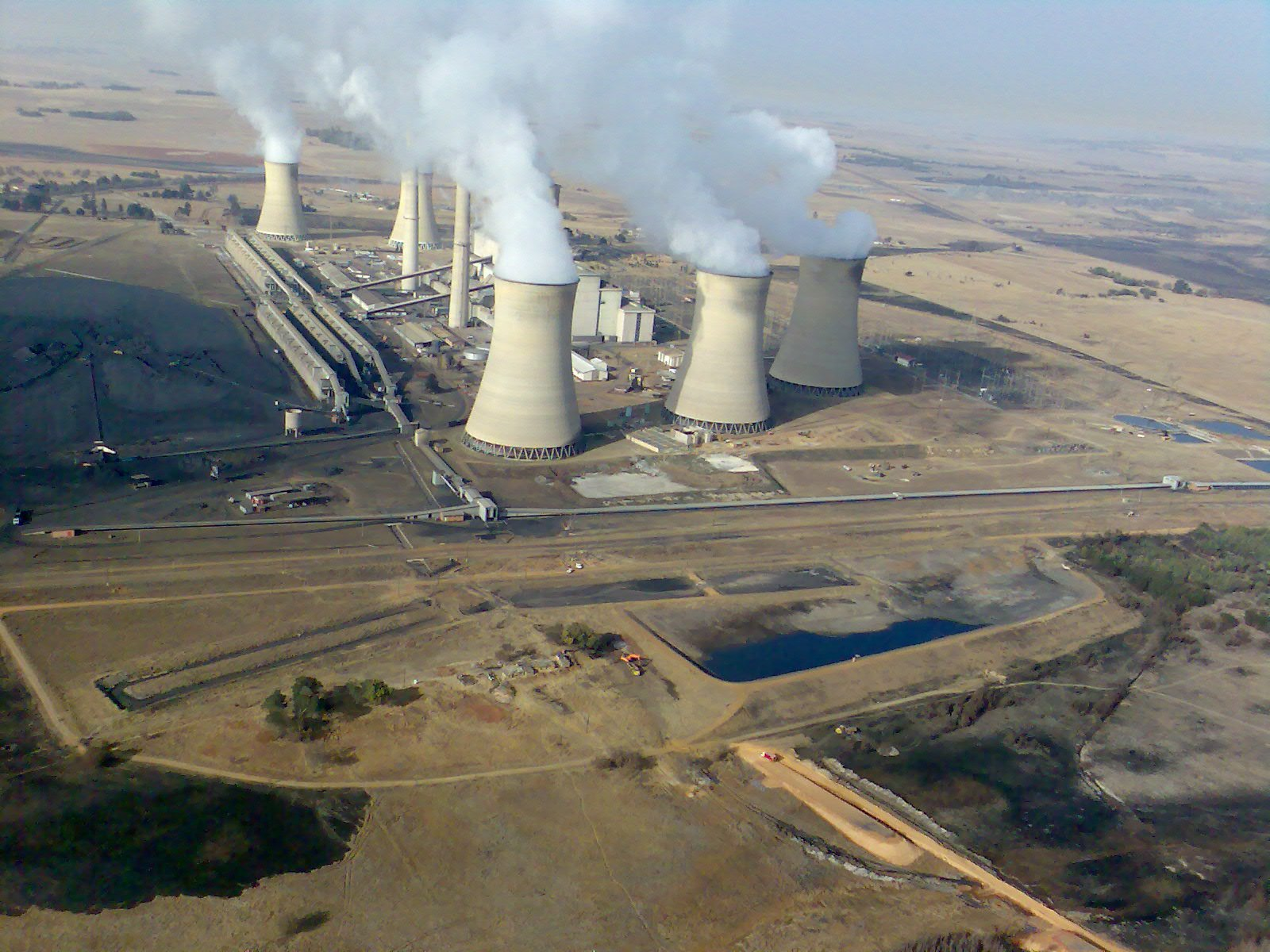
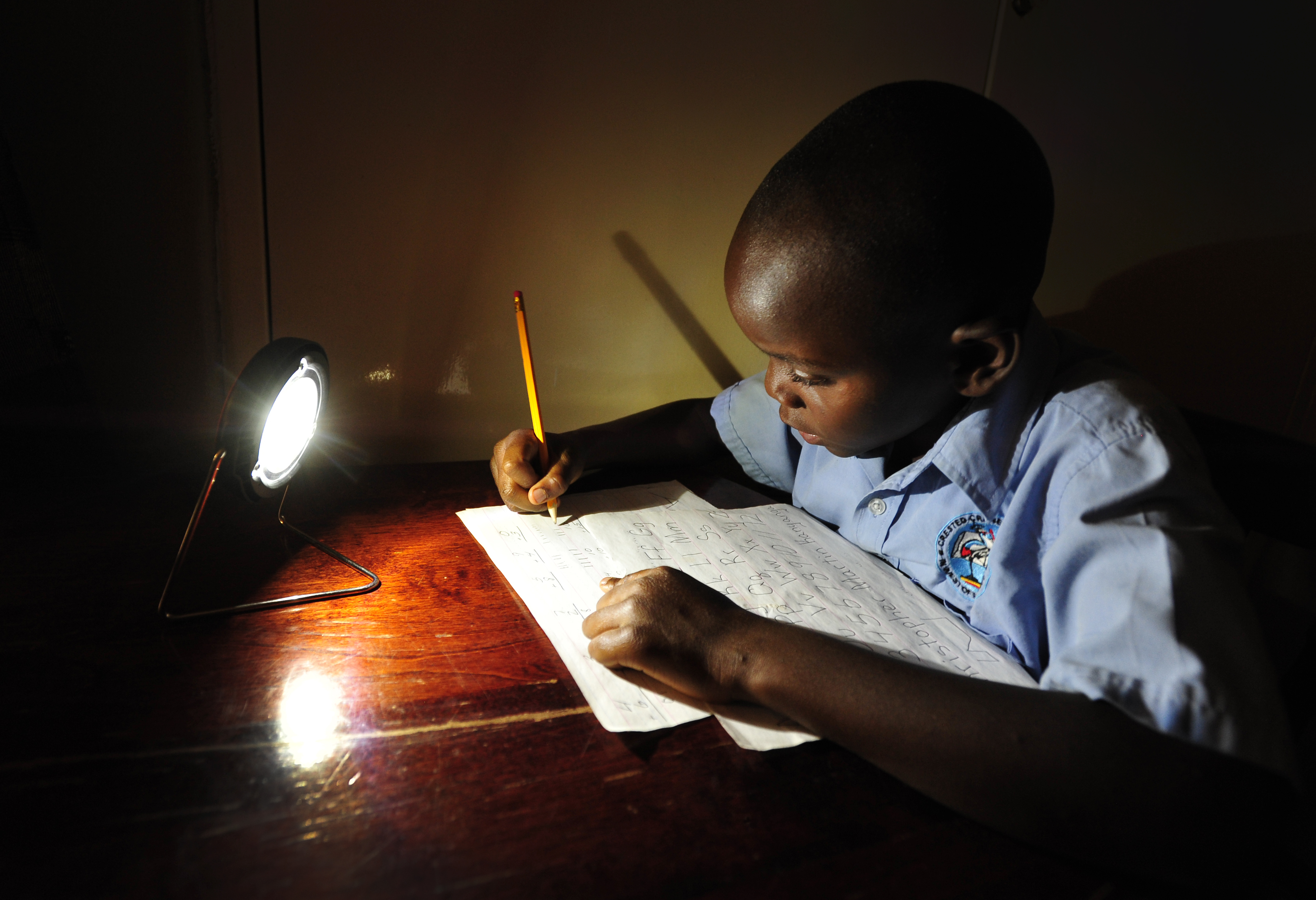
Cooking with biogas in Tanzania; Geothermal energy infrastructure in Kenya; Coal power station in South Africa; Solar-powered lamp-light in Zambia.

Energy in Africa is characterised by low per-capita consumption and limited access to modern energy services, reflecting both infrastructural and socio-economic challenges across the continent. As of 2023, Africa accounted for just 5.5% of global total final energy consumption, with per-capita energy use more than three times lower than the global average. The energy mix is dominated by biofuels and waste, which make up 43% of total final consumption, primarily for household cooking and heating, followed by oil products at 33%, electricity at 11%, natural gas at 9%, and coal at 4%.

Electricity access remains a major challenge, particularly in Sub-Saharan Africa, where nearly 450 million rural residents lack reliable electricity, and grid coverage is often inconsistent. Clean cooking solutions are similarly underdeveloped, leaving over 900 million people reliant on polluting fuels such as firewood, charcoal, and agricultural residues, which disproportionately affect women and children. Transport energy is dominated by oil products, reflecting low motorisation rates and limited adoption of electric mobility, although countries such as Ethiopia, Morocco, and Egypt have begun adopting policies to reduce fossil fuel dependency.

Africa possesses some of the world's most abundant energy resources, including oil, natural gas, coal, hydropower, solar, wind, geothermal, and biomass, much of which remains underutilised. While fossil fuels such as coal, oil, and natural gas continue to dominate energy production and electricity generation in Africa, renewable sources are increasingly expanding across the continent. Hydropower, solar, wind, geothermal, and modern biomass are growing in capacity, though their deployment remains uneven and limited compared to the continent's vast potential. Hydropower is the largest non-combustible renewable source, while solar energy offers immense potential due to high irradiation levels, particularly in the Sahara and Sahel.

There are regional differences: North Africa is dominated by oil and gas production, Southern Africa by coal and hydropower, East Africa by hydropower and geothermal, and West and Central Africa face major electrification gaps despite hydroelectric potential.

Expanding renewable energy deployment, strengthening grid and off-grid systems, and mobilising investment are central to improving energy access and supporting sustainable development. Energy development is closely linked to human well-being, influencing education, healthcare, economic productivity and gender equity, and is considered critical to achieving the United Nations Sustainable Development Goal 7 of affordable, reliable, and clean energy for all.

== Energy consumption ==
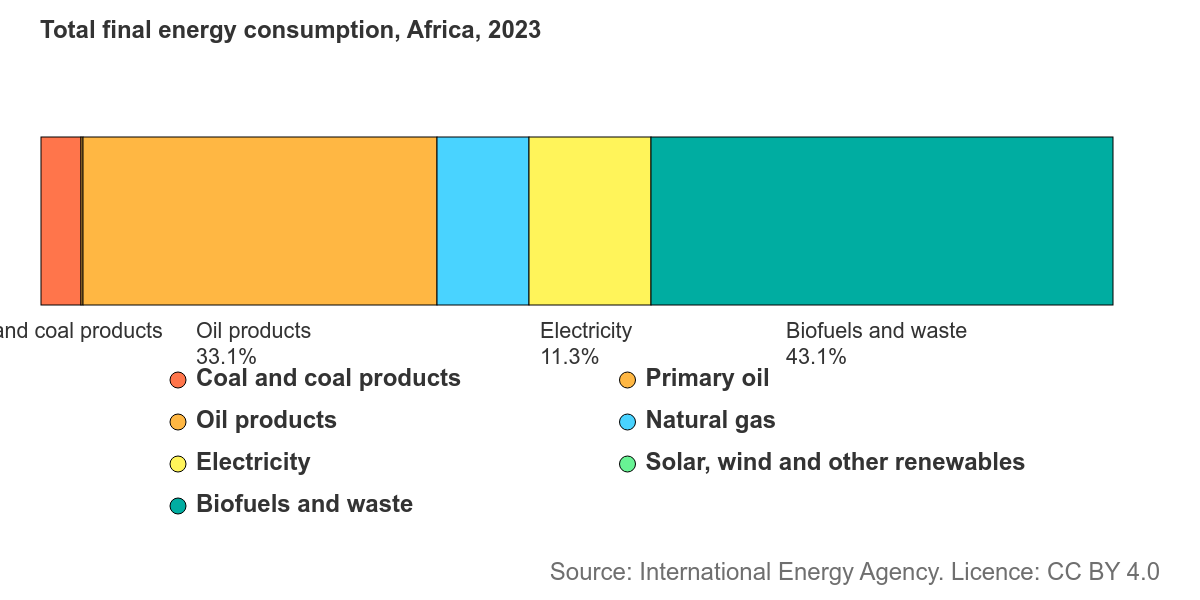
Total final energy consumption in Africa in 2023.

Energy consumption on the African continent is characterised by very low per-capita energy use compared with the global average, reflecting limited access to modern energy services in many of its 54 countries. In 2023 total final consumption (TFC) in Africa (the energy delivered via different energy carriers for end-uses such as gasoline for driving a petrol car, electricity for lighting and other appliances, or natural gas for cooking) stood at 5.5% of the global total final energy consumption. Per-capita final energy consumption is more than three times smaller than the global average.

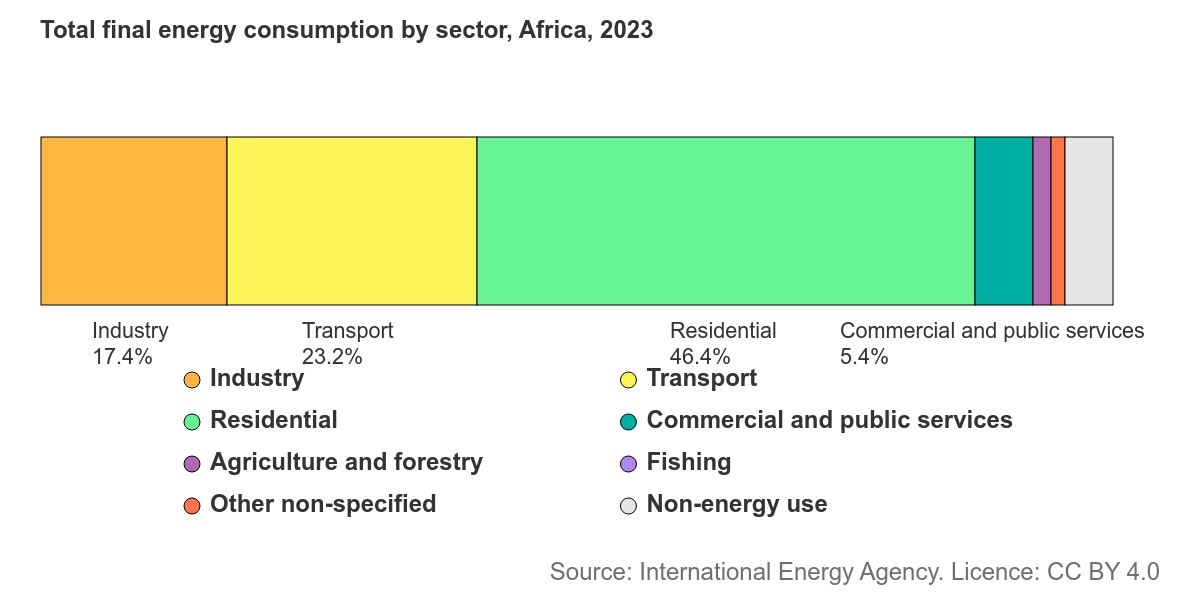
Total final energy consumption by sector in Africa in 2023.

As of 2023, final energy consumption was dominated by biofuels and waste (largely biomass combustion of wood, animal waste and traditional charcoal), which represented 43% of the total (mostly used for cooking and heating in the residential sector). Oil products hold second place with 33%, mostly fuels used in the transportation sector. Electricity represented only 11% as nearly half of the population (about 600 million people on the continent) still do not have access to electricity.

Additional data

Total final consumption of energy in Africa by source (2000-2023), PJ
Year	Coal	Crude & NGLs	Oil products	Natural gas	Renewables & waste	Electricity	Total
2000	798	1	3734	617	6 414	1 301	12865
2005	878	3	4 483	1 066	7 302	1 656	15388
2010	757	2	5 705	1 188	8 032	1 959	17644
2015	809	0	6 713	1 539	8 738	2 297	20096
2020	811	57	6 694	1 804	9 499	2 473	21337
2023	880	63	7 801	2 022	10 178	2 659	23603

Per-capita total final consumption of energy (2000-2023)
Year	Africa population (million)	Africa TFC per capita (GJ/person)	World population (billion)	World TFC per capita (GJ/person)
2000	830	15.5	6.17	47.0
2005	934	16.5	6.54	48.6
2010	1048	16.8	6.92	50.9
2015	1193	16.8	7.35	51.6
2020	1341	15.9	7.79	51.8
2023	1481	15.9	7.79	53.0

Structure of total final energy consumption (TFC) in 2023
Energy source	Africa (PJ)	Africa (% of total)	World (PJ)	World (% of total)	Africa (% of world)
Renewables & waste	10 178	43.1	42 237	9.8	24.1
Oil products	7 801	33.1	172 281	40.1	4.5
Electricity	2 659	11.3	90 905	21.2	2.9
Natural gas	2 022	8.6	70 329	16.4	2.9
Coal	880	3.7	36 946	8.6	2.4
Crude & NGLs	63	0.3	303	0.1	20.9
Heat	0	0.0	16 108	3.8	0.0
Total	23 603	100	429 035	100	5.5

=== Historical trends ===
Percentage of total energy use in Africa by country (2009)

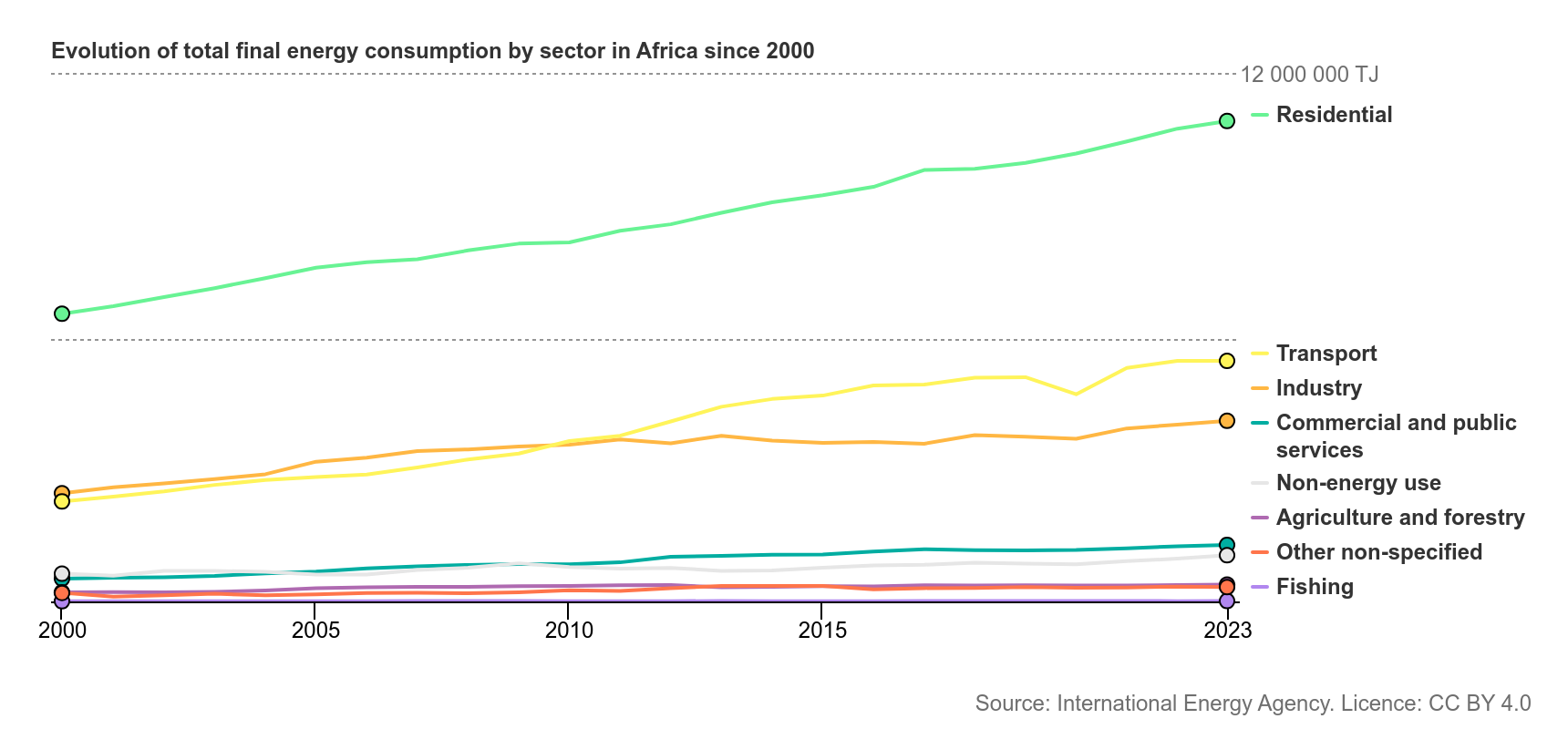
Evolution of total final energy consumption by sector in Africa since 2000.

Final energy consumption in Africa has increased substantially, nearly doubling in just over two decades between 2000 and 2023. However, energy consumption growth has largely risen from a low point and in line with population growth and per capita it has remained largely flat: up just 3% in 2023 compared to 2000, while global consumption per capita increased by 10% over the same period.

The composition of energy use has shifted only gradually. The share of biofuels and waste declined from around 50% of total final consumption in 2000 to 43% in 2023, reflecting a slow reduction in reliance on traditional biomass. Oil products increased slightly as a share of total consumption (from about 29% to 33%). Natural gas more than tripled in absolute terms and increased its share from roughly 5% to 9%, albeit from a low base. Electricity consumption more than doubled in absolute terms but its share rose only modestly, from around 10% to 11% of total final consumption. Coal's share declined over the period, remaining a small component of final energy use.

=== Access to energy sources ===
==== Electricity access ====
In the 1970s the electrical industry in Africa was facing an economic paradox where raising prices would prohibit access to their services, but the roll out of additional infrastructure to drive prices down and increase access needed additional capital that the industry could not afford. Overall rates of access to electricity in Africa have held constant from the 1980s to the early 2000s, while the rest of the world saw electrical grid distribution increase by 20%. Sub-Saharan Africa was the only region in the world where per-capita access rates are falling during that period.

Sub-Saharan Africa has the lowest rates of electricity access in the world.

Access to electricity has remained a major challenge across many African countries today. Some Northern African countries such as Algeria, Morocco and Egypt, as well as other African countries like Ghana, Gabon, and South Africa have made progress in tackling the issue. However, progress has remained limited across Central Africa and the Sahel regions. Sub-Saharan Africa has an average electrification rate of 53% as of 2023, up from 33% in 2010, but still well below the global average of 92% in 2023 and the number of people without access to electricity has remained almost unchanged (from 566 million in 2010 to 565 million in 2023).

In 2023, 35 million people in Sub-Saharan Africa gained electricity access, but with a population growth of 30 million, the net reduction in the access gap was only 5 million (from 570 million to 565 million). This region now accounts for 85% of the global population without electricity, up from 50% in 2010. Eighteen of the 20 countries with the largest electricity access deficits in 2023 were in Sub-Saharan Africa. As in the previous year, the deficits in Nigeria (86.6 million), the Democratic Republic of Congo (79.6 million), and Ethiopia (56.4 million) accounted for more than one-third of the globe's population without electricity. The access gap is increasingly concentrated in countries and regions suffering from conflict and violence. These conditions impede economic progress, limit government capacity for implementing grid expansion, and constrain consumer demand.

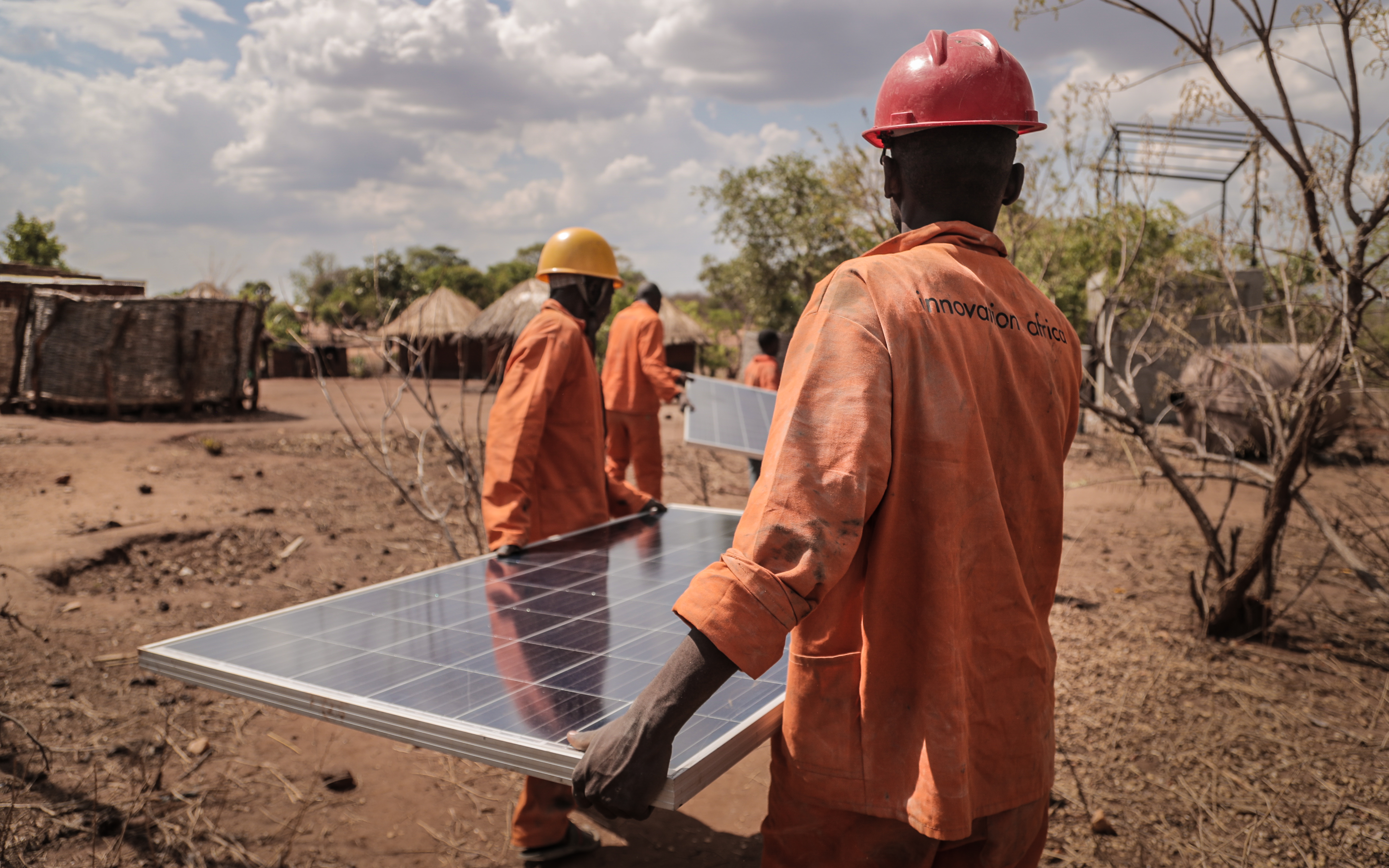
Solar panel installation.

Rural areas continue to face the most severe access challenges. Rural population growth in Sub-Saharan Africa has outpaced electrification, leaving 451.1 million people in rural areas without electricity in 2023, up from 376 million in 2010. The percentage of residences with access to electricity in Sub-Saharan Africa is the lowest in the world. In some remote regions, fewer than one in every 20 households has electricity. Even in areas covered by the electrical grid, power is often unreliable: only about half of areas with electricity access in Sub-Saharan Africa show signs of consistent electricity availability during peak evening hours.

The UN's most recent assessment of progress towards Sustainable Development Goal 7, which aims to deliver 'affordable, reliable, sustainable and modern energy for all' by 2030, concludes that progress towards universal electricity access by 2030 remains off track, particularly in Sub-Saharan Africa. At current rates of progress, it estimates that 645 million people around the world will still lack electricity access in 2030, the majority in Sub-Saharan Africa.

Expansion costs are typically higher in Sub-Saharan Africa, as dispersed populations and weak transmission networks increase the per-connection cost of grid investment. Utilities in Sub-Saharan Africa face constraints that limit their ability to raise financing, invest in infrastructure, improve service and generate adequate revenue.

While renewable energy deployment in many African countries is expanding, limited investment, weak grid infrastructure and financing constraints mean the global renewable energy boom has not yet translated into rapid, widespread improvements in electricity access across much of the continent. While Africa accounts for around 20% of the world's population it attracts less than 2% of its spending on clean energy.

Electrification efforts increasingly rely on a mix of grid extension, mini-grids, and off-grid solutions tailored to local conditions. Mini-grids and stand-alone off-grid solar systems have become increasingly important due to their cost-effectiveness in remote and sparsely populated areas. In Sub-Saharan Africa, decentralised systems have accounted for more than half of new electricity connections in recent years (55% over 2020–2022).

The IEA projects that universal access to electricity could be near by 2035 if global efforts were stepped up to rates equivalent to the best achieved so far. In its ACCESS scenario, the IEA estimates that sub-Saharan Africa would need to see 70 million people gain access each year, almost a fourfold increase compared to today. Several Sub-Saharan African countries, including Nigeria, Ethiopia, Kenya, Madagascar and Ghana, have recently strengthened their electricity access policy frameworks, adopting new targets through Energy Compacts agreed at the African Energy Summit in Dar es Salaam in 2025.

==== Clean cooking ====
Cooking with firewood in South Africa.

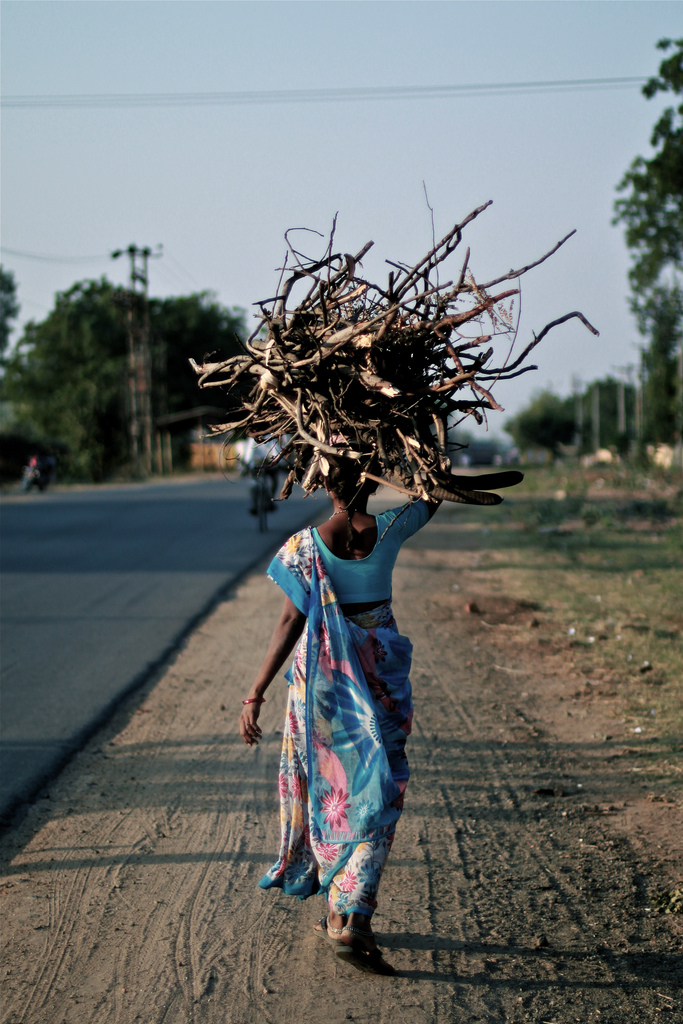
Woman carrying firewood.

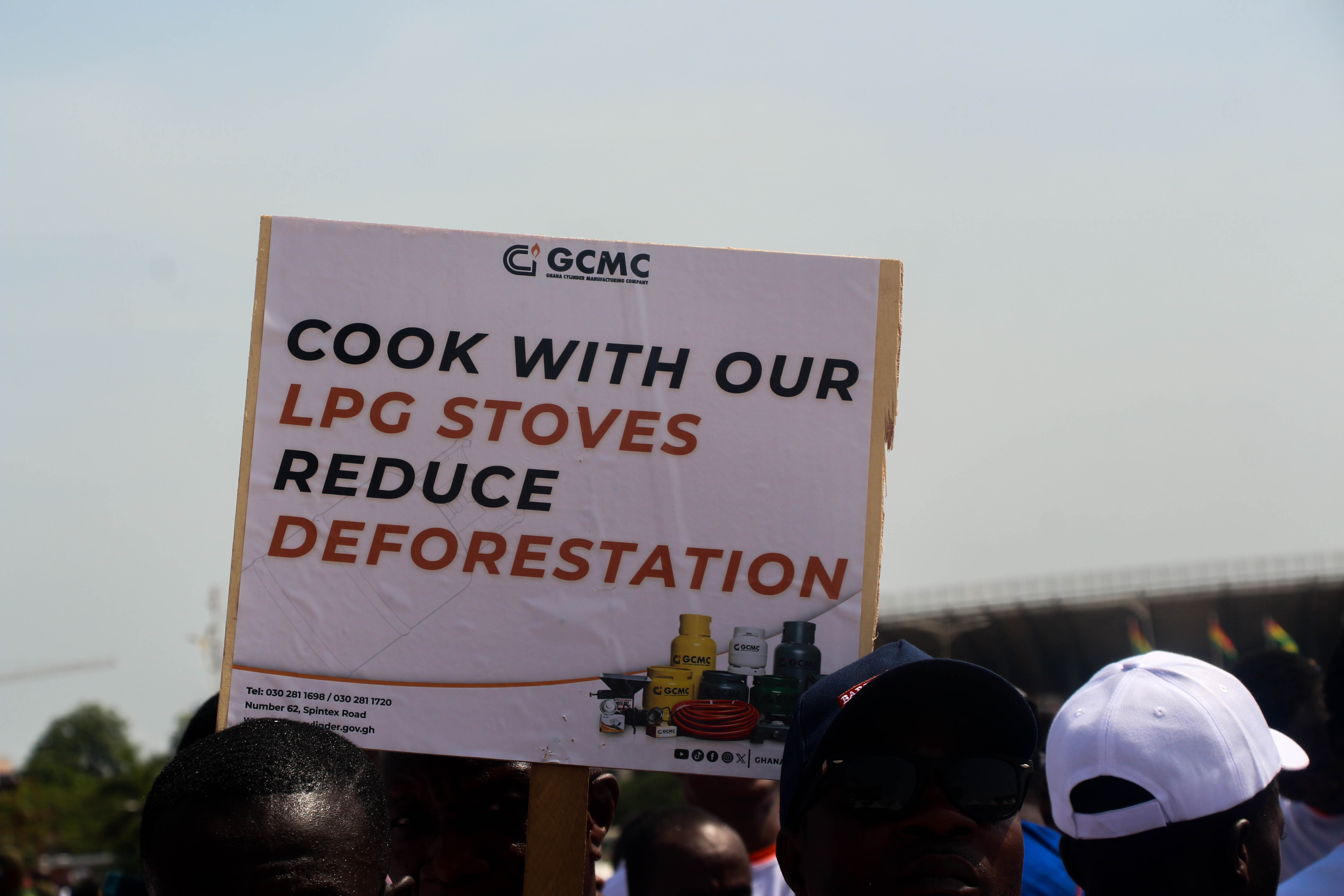
Advocating for clean cooking stove in Ghana to reduce deforestation.

Clean cooking access remains one of the most persistent energy challenges in Africa. Clean cooking solutions generally refer to fuels and technologies that substantially reduce household air pollution compared with traditional use of firewood, charcoal, dung and crop residues. They include liquefied petroleum gas (LPG), natural gas, electricity and biogas. Despite global progress, Sub-Saharan Africa remains the only region where the absolute number of people without access is still growing, and in 2023 only 21% of Sub-Saharan African's had access to clean cooking fuels and technologies, "leaving over 900 million people relying on polluting cooking fuels and technologies".^{:35} Across Africa, firewood, charcoal and residues from agriculture amount to over 53% of total final energy consumption in the entire continent, and in households biomass still makes up the largest share at 85%.

The health and social impacts of reliance on polluting fuels are severe. In 2021, "exposure to household air pollution was estimated to contribute to 2.9 million premature deaths annually, including over 329,000 deaths of children under the age of five".^{:46} Biomass use is associated with around 500,000 cases of premature deaths in women and children annually This lack of access puts an especially large strain on women and girls.^{:34} Wealth disparities are pronounced, for example, in Kenya, poorer parts of the population show less than 1% access while the wealthiest reach 84%.^{:46}

Progress has been constrained by demographic and structural factors. According to the World Bank, "overall progress continues to be outpaced by rapid population growth", while "population growth, weak policy frameworks, inadequate infrastructure, lagging innovation, and limited affordability of clean cooking solutions… continue to hinder progress".^{:35} Although policy momentum has increased, with 50 new clean cooking policies established since early 2024 in Sub-Saharan Africa^{:289}, "less than 20% of clean cooking plans are backed by clear financing schemes".^{:121}

Under current trajectories it is expected that by the end of the decade, nearly as many people as today will still lack access, and over 75% of them (nearly 1 billion people) will likely still depend on polluting fuels and technologies in 2030.^{:121} Even under accelerated pathways, universal access in Sub-Saharan Africa is projected only "just before 2040.^{:289}

==== Mobility and transport ====
Access to modern energy for transport in Africa is closely linked to oil product consumption. Africa accounts for around 4.5% of global oil product consumption, reflecting comparatively low motorisation rates and transport fuel use per capita.

Motorisation levels remain significantly below global averages. In 2017, the average motorisation rate in Africa was 73 vehicles per 1,000 people, compared to a global average of 300 and 180 in developing countries. Ownership is concentrated in a small number of relatively higher-income economies, led by Libya (490 vehicles per 1,000 people), followed by South Africa (176 vehicles per 1,000 people).

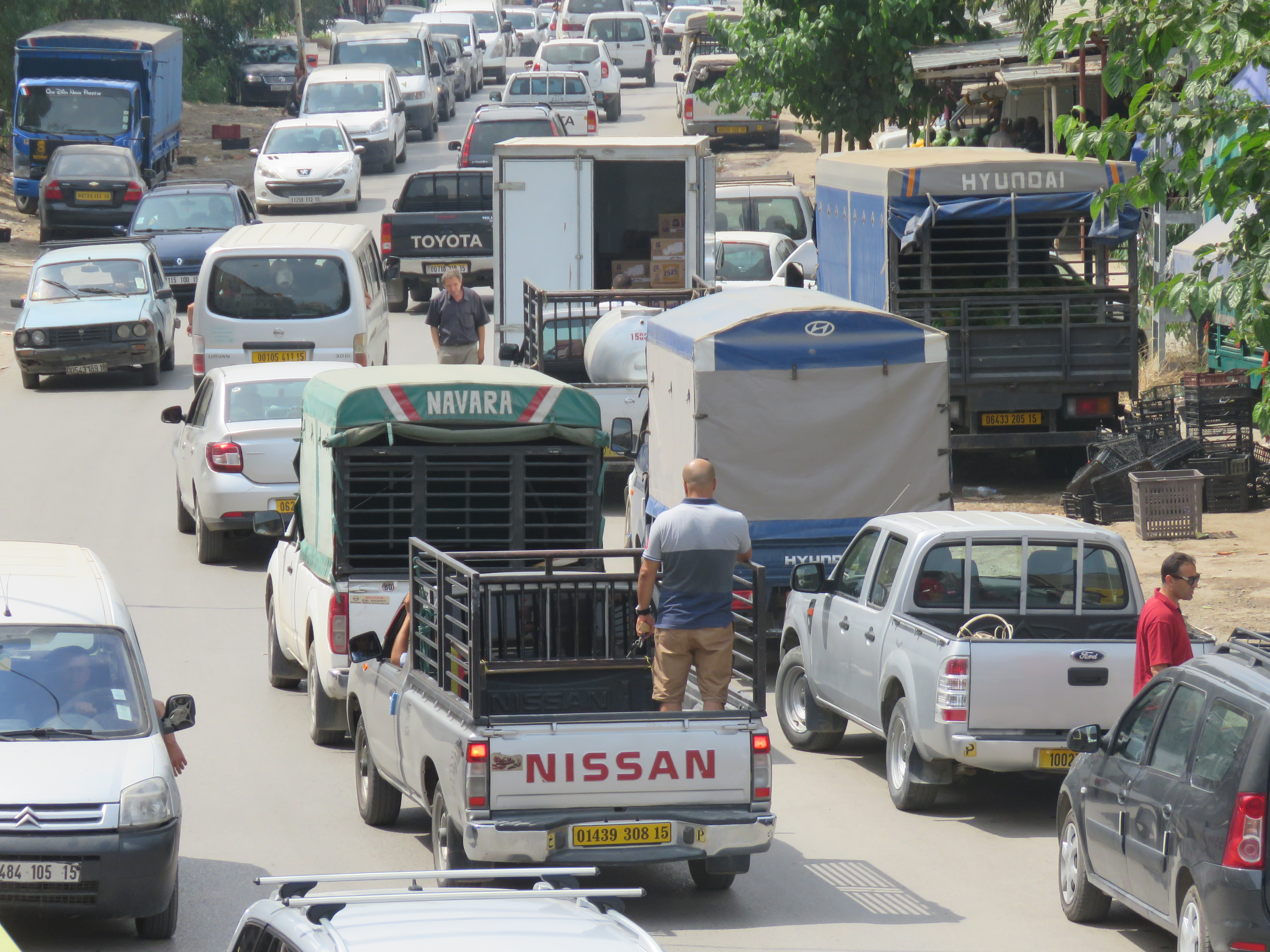
Road traffic in Algeria.

High fuel costs and income constraints have limited faster growth in private vehicle ownership. Many African countries are net oil importers and therefore exposed to global fuel price volatility, which increases import bills and affects transport affordability.

Electric mobility remains at an early stage but is expanding. In 2024, electric car sales across Africa doubled from 2023 to reach 11,000 units, with several countries such as Morocco and Egypt at over 2,000 units. However the share in total car sales remained low, at less than 1%.

Policy measures are beginning to reshape transport energy access. In 2024, Ethiopia announced a ban on the import of new internal combustion engine vehicles, becoming the first country to prohibit gasoline and diesel car imports in order to reduce fuel import costs and promote electric vehicles. The policy combines restrictions on Internal Combustion Engine imports with preferential treatment for EVs. This has resulted in a strong increase in EV deployment reaching 100,000 electric vehicles. Despite these developments, oil products continue to dominate transport energy use in Africa, and the pace of electrification remains constrained by limited charging infrastructure, electricity reliability challenges and high upfront EV costs relative to average incomes.

== Energy transformation ==
Before they reach consumers, some modern energy sources need to undergo transformation from primary sources - the raw energy contained in natural resources - into more practical forms. This mainly includes the refining of crude oil into oil products like gasoline and the generation of electricity from different primary sources like coal (burned to drive the turbines that generate electricity) or the energy of the sun (transformed into electricity by technologies like solar PV panels).

=== Electricity ===
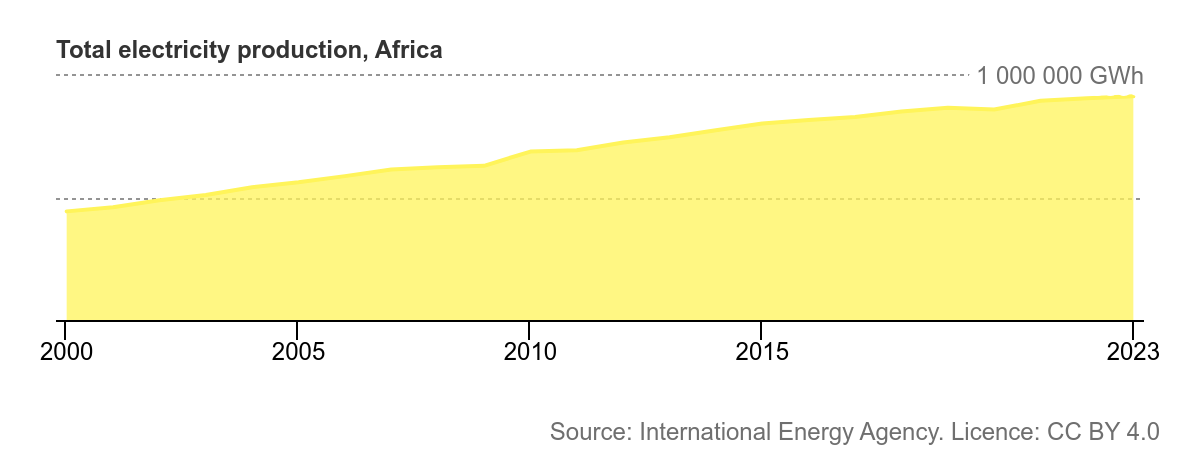
Total electricity production, 2000 - 2023.

Gas is the largest single source of electricity on the African continent, producing about 43% of total generation in 2024, followed by coal and hydropower. Gas use is concentrated in North Africa and coal use in South Africa. In 2024, 25% of Africa's electricity was generated from clean sources, including hydropower, nuclear, solar and wind - below the global average of 41%.

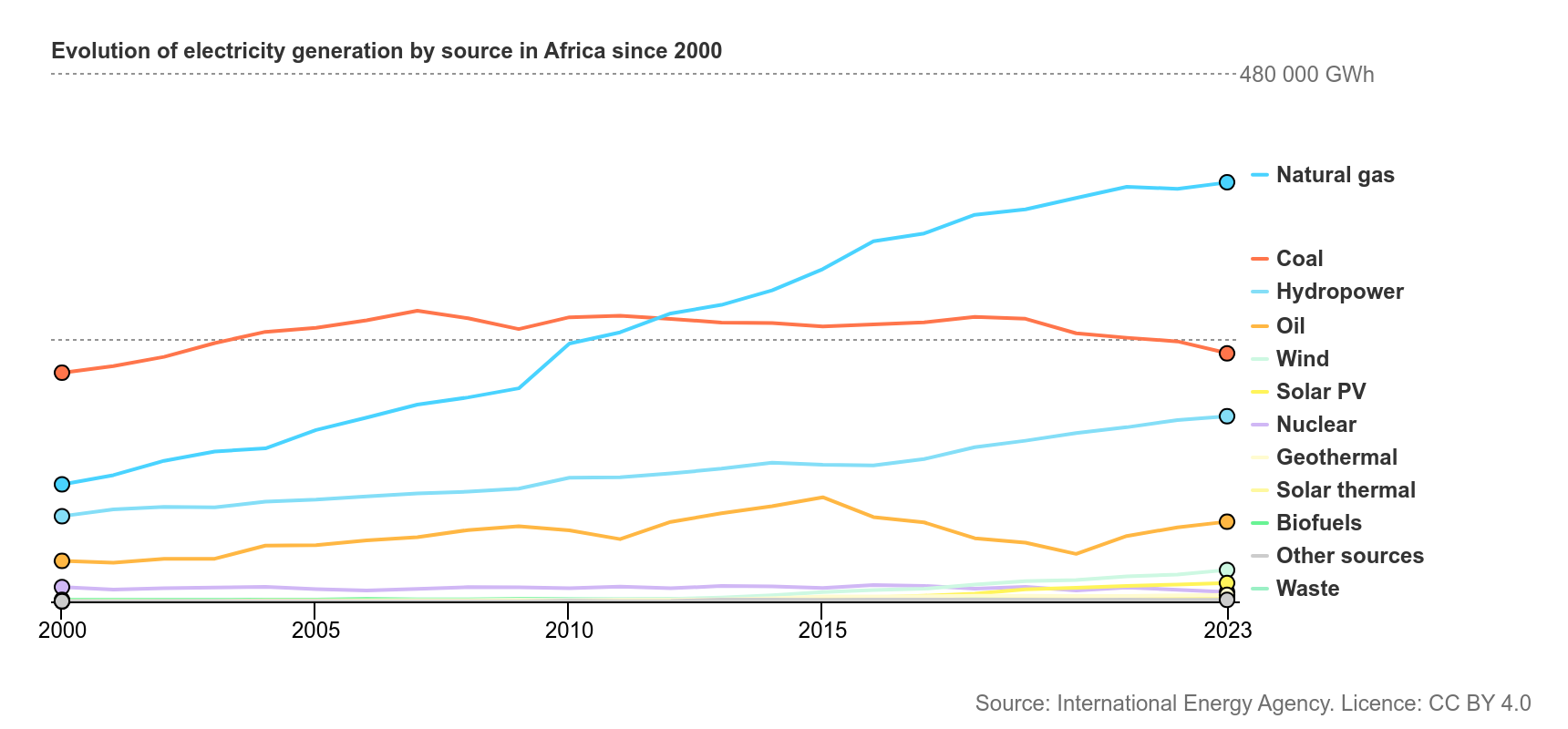
Evolution of electricity generation by source in Africa since 2000.

Gas generation has increased by 52% over the last decade, with gas-producing countries in North Africa especially increasing their reliance on the fuel. By contrast, coal generation is approximately the same as 20 years ago, with South Africa (home to 84% of Africa's coal generation) being the notable exception. Clean power accounted for 54% of Africa's electricity generation growth in the last five years. The remaining 46% was met with fossil fuel generation.

South Africa is the largest producer of electricity in the continent, accounting for 25% of electricity generation in 2023, followed by Egypt (23%) and Algeria (10.4%). As of 2022 South Africa is the only African country with nuclear electricity generation, the largest producer of electricity from non-hydro renewables (solar, wind, geothermal, biofuels and waste) and the biggest producer of electricity from fossil fuels. It is also the biggest net exporter of electricity, followed by Mozambique and Zambia. Zambia is the largest producer of electricity from hydropower. The largest net importing countries as of 2022 were Namibia, followed by Tunisia and Zimbabwe.

While many African countries rely on domestic oil, gas or coal resources to generate electricity, others depend on imported fuels, leaving them vulnerable to volatile international markets. In Senegal, imported liquid fuels for electricity generation contribute to very high electricity costs, which governments sometimes partially offset with subsidies, which increases financial pressure. Burundi, which relies heavily on fossil fuels for its electricity production, has faced severe fuel shortage for nearly five years as of October 2025, causing outages.

African countries are increasingly shifting towards renewable sources for electricity, driven by declining technology costs and supportive policies that enable greater use of its abundant natural resources, particularly solar energy, as Africa has the most abundant solar resources in the world.

Historically, Kenya depended on imported crude oil and natural gas for electricity generation. Over the past two decades, Kenya has been reducing this reliance through expansion of wind, solar, geothermal and hydropower, aiming to increase the share of non-fossil generation.

=== Oil products ===
Only about a quarter of Africa's crude oil is refined and transformed into oil products on the continent, leaving many countries dependent on imported petroleum products to meet demand. In regional terms, oil refining in Africa is predominantly located in Northern Africa (57%) and Southern Africa (24%). Combined, Western Africa, Central Africa and Eastern Africa account for less than 20% of total refinery output. Algeria is the largest producer of oil products, followed by Egypt and Libya. Very few countries import crude oil to refine into oil products. The three main ones are South Africa, Egypt and Ivory Coast. Morocco stopped importing crude oil in 2016 after its Mohammedia refinery stopped activity in 2015.

Between 2000 and 2023, total oil products refined in Africa fell by 20%. Africa has been a net importer of refined fuels since 2005, and imports now significantly exceed exports. This is particularly true in sub-Saharan Africa, where refineries are old, inefficient and unable to supply in‐demand premium, low sulphur transport fuels. Several refineries are being closed or are at risk of closure as they are unable to meet fuel quality standards and cannot secure financing for much‐needed investment in upgrades or maintenance.

== Energy production ==
=== Oil ===
Total oil production in Africa has been declining since 2008. The five largest oil-producing countries - Nigeria, Angola, Algeria, Libya, and Egypt - represent 83% of Africa's total oil production. Africa's oil production is mainly exported. Oil production in Africa is in decline and unlikely to return to its highest historical values due to geological and economic factors. This has major implications for government revenues and fiscal balances in producing countries.

=== Gas ===
Natural gas production in Africa has been growing over the last two decades - doubling from 4,373,175 TJ in 2000 to 8,834,224 in 2023. Africa has seen major discoveries of natural gas deposits since 2010, especially in Mozambique and Tanzania in the early 2010s, followed by Egypt in 2015, and Senegal and Mauritania in the late‐2010s. Of all natural gas discovered globally between 2010 and 2020, 40% was in Africa, leading to a 20% growth in natural gas production in the 2010s, the bulk of it in sub‐Saharan Africa.

Natural gas production in Africa is highly concentrated in a few countries. The two largest producing countries account for more than half of total natural gas production in 2023, with Algeria holding the top spot and accounting for over 40% of natural gas production in Africa, followed by Egypt with over 20%. Overall, all countries in Africa accounted for 6% of global natural gas production in 2023 - behind Iran (6.6%), Russia (14.9%) and the US (25.3%).

Nearly a third (32.2%) of the natural gas produced in Africa was exported in 2023. With 3,469,897 TJ exported in 2023, Africa as a continent ranked 6th among the largest gas exporters globally, after Australia. While the continent as whole is a net exporter, with Algeria a major exporting country, many African countries remain dependent on imports to meet their natural gas demand. Even Egypt, the second largest producer of natural gas in Africa, has seen its exports and imports fluctuate over the last decade due to growing domestic demand and falling domestic production, followed by the start up of new production fields. Meanwhile, South Africa has limited natural gas resources that can be commercially exploited, so it imports most of its natural gas from Mozambique.

=== Coal ===
Coal in Africa is a regionally concentrated, with the continent holding roughly 5% of global proven recoverable coal reserves, and about 27 African countries identified as possessing coal‑bearing geology. South Africa dominates the sub‑Saharan coal landscape, accounting for over 90% of the continent's coal production and nearly all large‑scale exploitation, where coal still supplies around three‑quarters of primary energy and roughly 80% of electricity generation through state‑owned utilities such as Eskom. Other countries, including Mozambique, Botswana, and Zimbabwe, hold sizeable undeveloped or partially developed reserves and have been targeted for expanded mining and export projects, while multiple smaller nations report minor coal occurrences.

Across the continent, coal use remains tightly linked to economic development, industrialization, and energy‑security debates, but it is increasingly contested by climate‑change concerns, air‑pollution impacts, and efforts to promote renewable‑based just transition pathways, particularly in heavily coal‑dependent economies such as South Africa.

=== Renewable energy ===
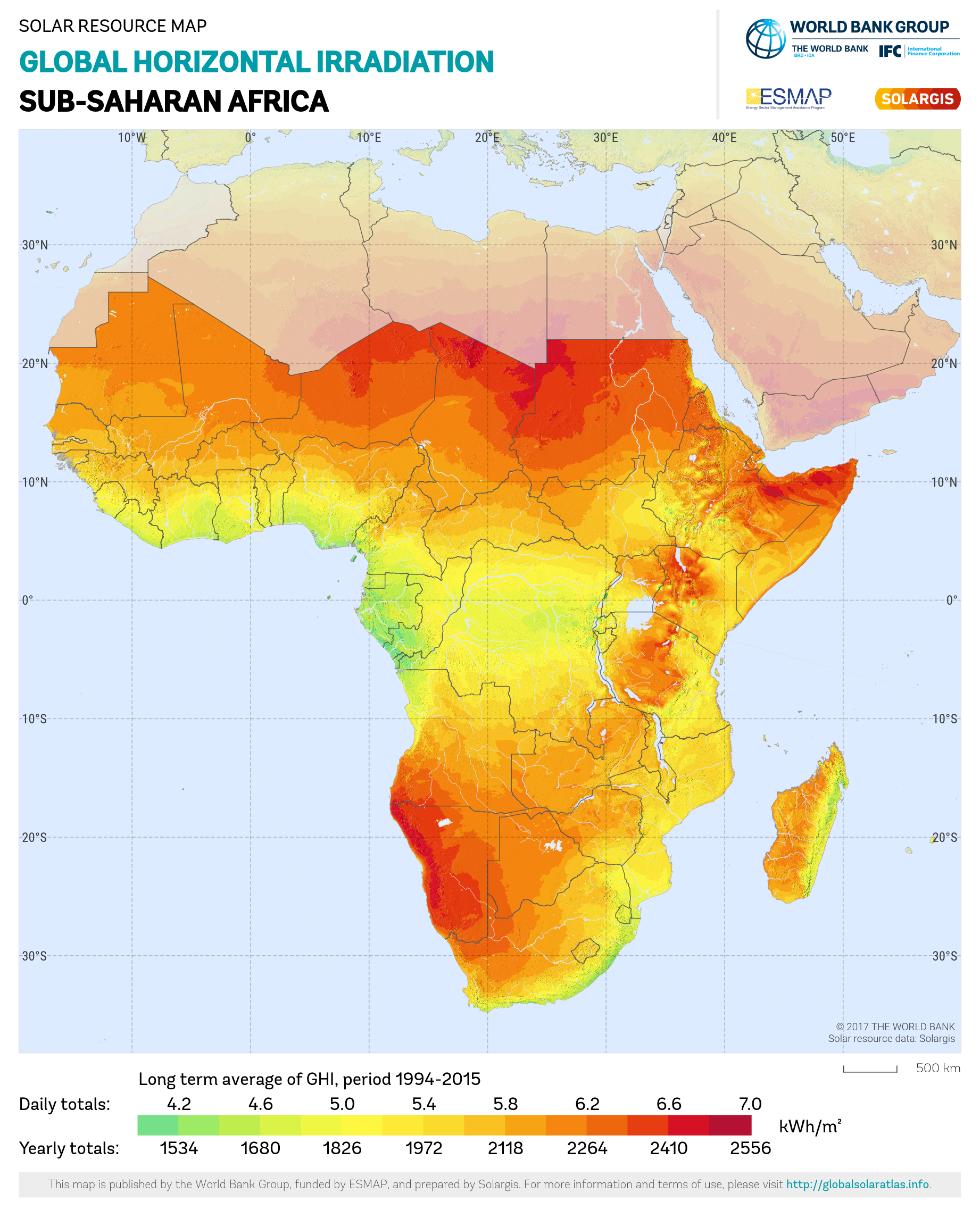
Global horizontal irradiation in Sub-Saharan Africa.

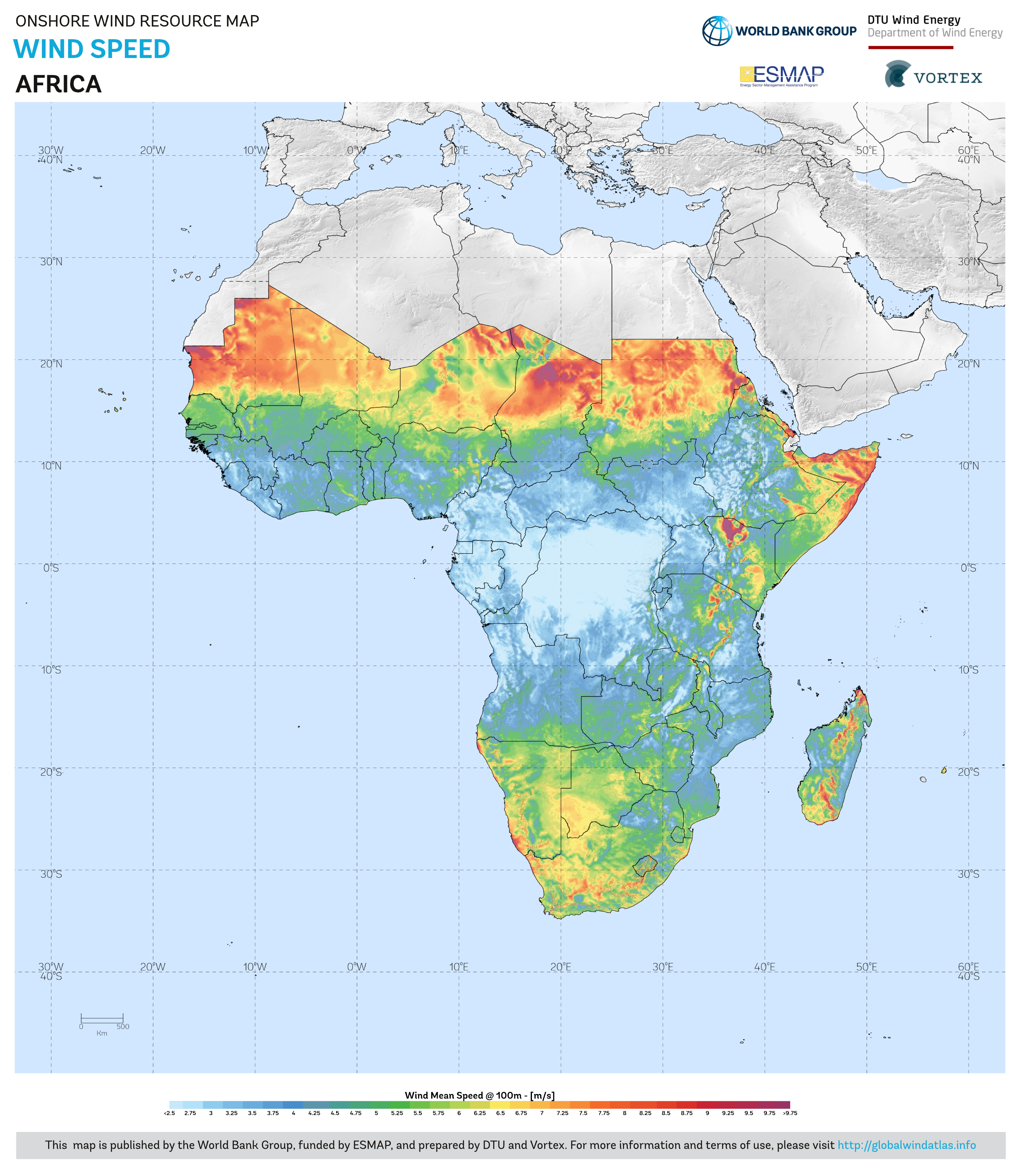
Mean wind speed in Sub-Saharan Africa.

Africa possesses some of the world’s most abundant renewable energy resources, including solar, wind, hydropower, geothermal, and biomass, yet a significant portion of this potential remains underdeveloped. In 2002 just 7,72% of Africa's final energy consumption was made up of renewables. Gabon leads African nations with 66% of final energy consumption made up of renewables, Eswatini is second with just under 40%.

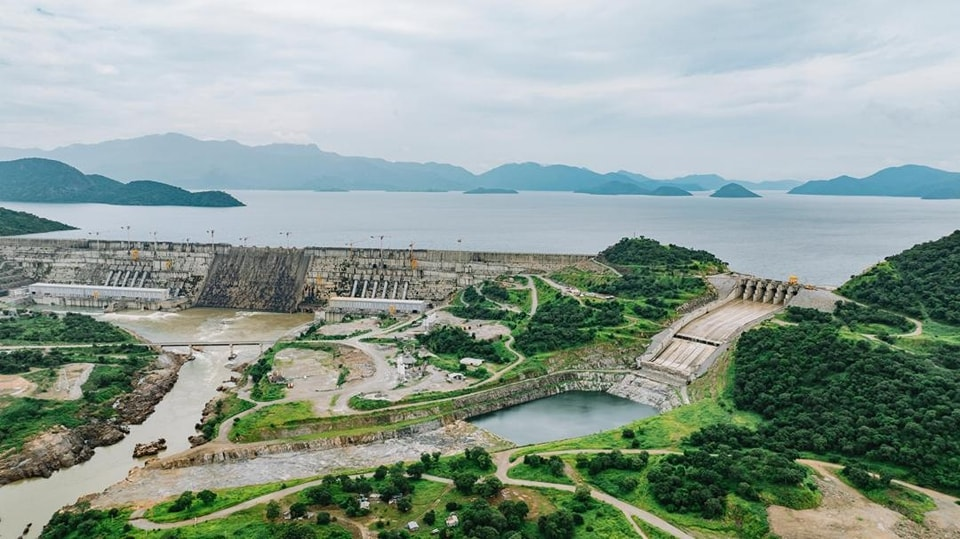
The Grand Ethiopian Renaissance Dam. Hydropower is the largest non-combustible renewable source in Africa's electricity generation.

Solar energy is particularly promising in Africa due to the continent's high levels of irradiation, especially in regions such as the Sahara and Sahel, while countries like Kenya and Ethiopia have made notable progress in geothermal and hydropower development. The International Renewable Energy Agency estimates that renewables could supply the majority of Africa's future energy needs, supporting both electrification and climate goals.

Hydropower currently represents the largest share of non-combustible renewable electricity generation, though only 10% of total potential has been exploited. Large-scale projects such as the Grand Ethiopian Renaissance Dam and the Kainji Dam are examples of investment in this sector. Wind energy is the second largest, with projects like the Lake Turkana Wind Power Station demonstrating the viability of utility-scale generation. In addition, modern biomass and bioenergy systems offer opportunities to replace traditional fuel use with cleaner alternatives. Despite this potential, challenges including limited infrastructure, financing constraints, and policy and regulatory barriers continue to hinder widespread deployment, although falling technology costs and increased international support are accelerating the transition toward renewable energy across the continent.

== Energy by region ==
=== North Africa ===
North Africa is dominant in oil and in gas, for Libya obtains approximately 50% of the oil reserves available in Africa. Libya designated US$5 billion to assert programs and regulations that will reduce carbon emissions. Resources, such as oil and gas, are also prevalent in Algeria, in addition to natural gas. According to the Renewable Energy Sector in N. Africa, solar capacity is also extremely relevant in North Africa. The total power installed in North Africa region was roughly 61.6 GW in 2012. This is mostly made up of hydro accounting for nearly 10%.

=== Southern Africa ===
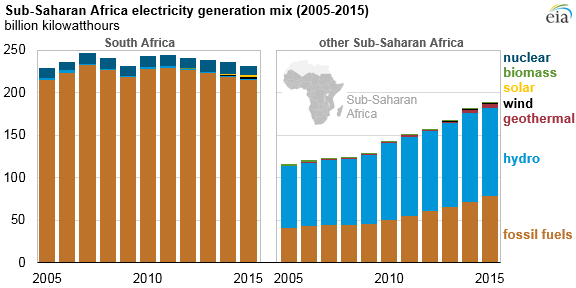
Energy sources in sub-Saharan Africa (2005-2015). Fossil fuels and hydroelectric power make up the largest share of sub-Saharan African electricity.

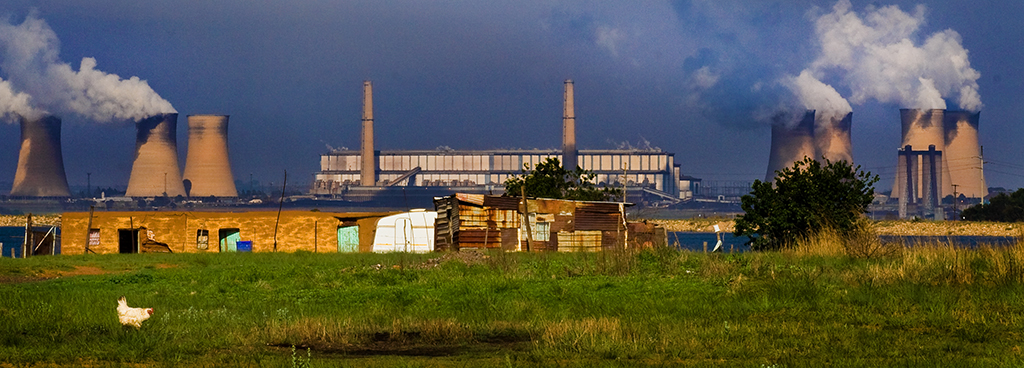
Coal mines and power stations in South Africa.

Southern Africa has 91 percent of all of Africa's coal reserves and 70% of the nuclear/uranium resources in Africa, according to Professor Iwayemi. Southern Africa follows Central Africa closely in hydro resources; hydroelectric potential can particularly be found in the Congo DRC, Mozambique, Zambia, Cameroon, Ethiopia, Sudan, and Nigeria. Mozambique in particular has joined an international initiative to develop an energy action plan, to contribute to Sustainable Energy for All.

The country of South Africa alone possesses the sixth largest coal reserves on the planet, after China, the US, India, Russia and Australia. Specific renewable resources in South Africa include solar, wind, hydro power, wave energy, and bio-energy.

As of 2017, Zambia is in a massive power crisis that began in June. In Lusaka the eight-hour blackouts cause families to cook on a simple charcoal fire. The reason for this is poor rainfall, causing less hydroelectric output.

Despite recent improvements and the sub-Saharan African off-grid solar industry's rapid expansion over the past ten years, some 600 million people in the region still lack access to power.

=== East Africa ===
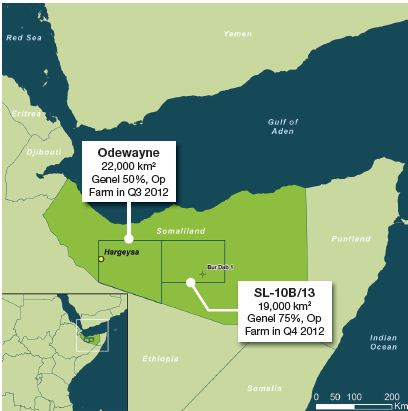
Somaliland oil explorations.

East Africa possesses diverse energy resources, including hydropower, geothermal, solar, wind, biomass, and fossil fuels, with biomass historically accounting for over 90% of total energy consumption, particularly for household cooking and heating. Electricity generation is increasingly dominated by renewable sources, especially hydropower, which provides a majority share of installed capacity, while countries like Kenya have expanded geothermal and wind energy production. Despite these resources, East Africa continues to face significant energy poverty, with hundreds of millions lacking access to electricity and clean cooking solutions, and electrification rates in several countries remaining below 50%. In recent years, regional initiatives and international investments have focused on expanding grid infrastructure, promoting renewable energy, and improving cross-border energy trade, positioning the energy sector as a key driver of economic development and climate resilience in the region.

=== West Africa ===
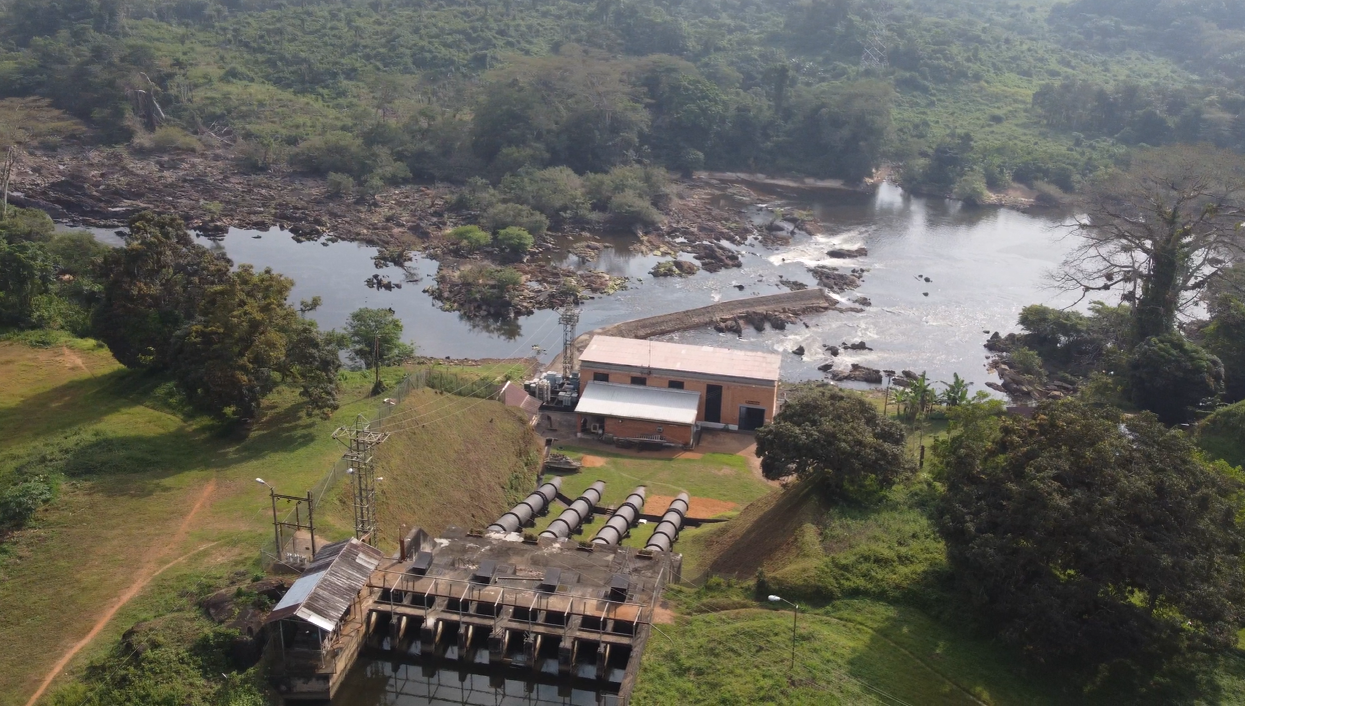
Firestone Hydroelectricity Plant in Liberia.

Electricity access in Ghana increased 500% between 1991 and 2000, but per capita consumption actually fell over the same period, suggesting electricity usage was unaffordable. Ghana was also one of the primary countries to develop an energy action plan, in response to the initiative for Sustainable Energy for All.

Nigeria is currently a dumping ground for electronic products, which leach toxic metals and substances such as lead, mercury, cadmium, arsenic, antimony, and trioxide into water sources. When burned, carcinogenic dioxins and polyaromatic hydrocarbons are emitted and toxic chemicals like barium are transmitted into the soil. The 1989 Basel Convention established an international treaty designed to regulate hazardous waste from being dumped into the developing world.

In reflection of statements made in Prof. Iwayemi's essay, West Africa does have some coal reserves – approximately 10 percent of coal in Africa, particularly Nigeria. West Africa also exhibits some nuclear resources. In addition to coal reserves, Nigeria contains natural gas and oil resources.

With a huge discrepancy between urban (70%) and rural (18%) areas, only 40% of people in Benin have access to electricity, leaving over five million without it. Currently, just 10% of homes use off-grid solar equipment.

=== Central Africa ===
Central Africa has abundant hydro-electric resources due to the multiple rivers that run through this region. The publication Energy Economics estimates that replacing South African coal power with hydroelectric imported from the Democratic Republic of the Congo could save 40 million tons of carbon dioxide emissions annually.

== Human rights, development and energy ==
Human factors such as population growth, urbanization, income inequality, education levels, and gender dynamics play an important role in shaping energy access and human development outcomes in Africa. Limited access to reliable and affordable energy, particularly electricity and clean cooking fuels, constrains progress in healthcare, education, and economic productivity, disproportionately affecting rural populations and women, who often bear the burden of collecting traditional biomass fuels, such as kindling.

Improved energy access is strongly linked to higher human development indicators, including better school performance, reduced poverty, and enhanced livelihood opportunities. Energy development is therefore critical not only for economic growth but also for the realization of fundamental human rights, such as the rights to health, education, and an adequate standard of living, as recognized by the United Nations through its Sustainable Development Goal 7 (affordable and clean energy). The International Energy Agency emphasizes that achieving universal energy access in Africa would significantly reduce inequality, improve gender equity, and support climate-resilient development pathways. Expanding sustainable energy systems is therefore widely regarded as a cornerstone of inclusive development and social justice across the continent.

Access to modern forms of Energy can impact socio-economic parameters like income, education, and life expectancy. Energy can act as a multiplier of the Millennium Development Goals through its ability to stimulate economic growth to generate employment, improve educational opportunities, and improve general health compared to existing energy sources.

== Policy ==
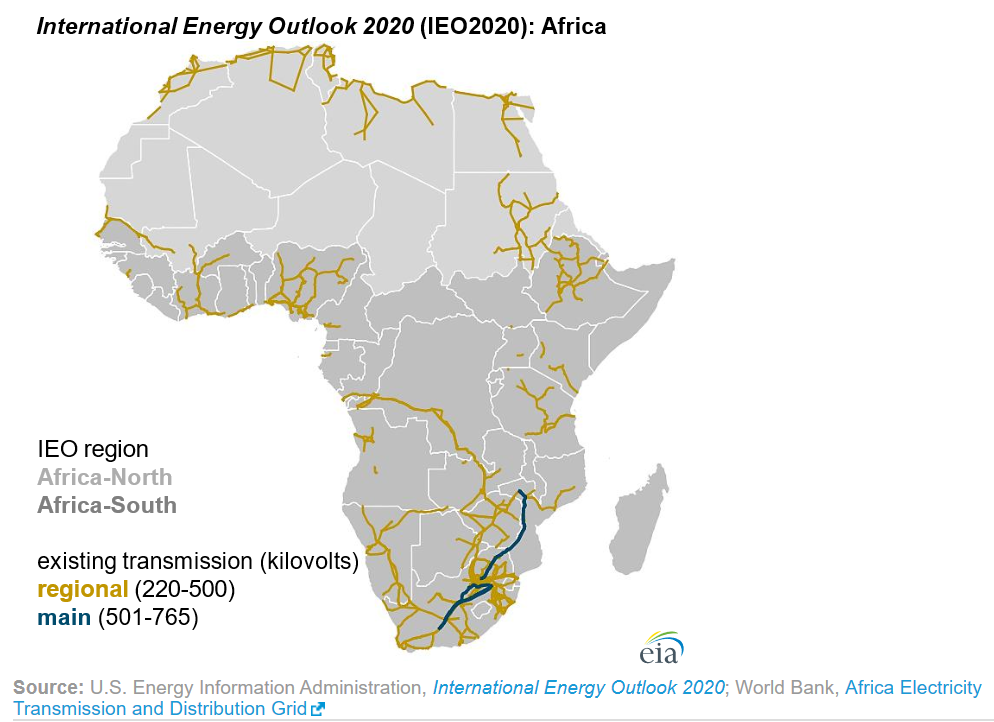
Major power transmission lines in Africa

The policy context of energy in Africa is shaped by a combination of national strategies, regional cooperation, and global development frameworks aimed at expanding access, improving sustainability, and supporting economic growth. Many African countries have adopted energy policies focused on electrification, renewable energy expansion, and reducing reliance on traditional biomass, often aligned with continental initiatives such as those led by the African Union and the African Energy Commission (AFREC), and regional power pools. At the global level, frameworks like the United Nations Sustainable Development Goal 7 guide policy priorities, while institutions such as the World Bank and International Energy Agency support implementation through funding, data, and technical assistance. Despite progress, challenges remain in policy coordination, regulatory capacity, infrastructure investment, and ensuring equitable access, particularly for rural and low-income populations.

=== Attracting investment ===
As a whole, foreign direct investment into Africa has been low. According to the Forum of Energy Ministers of Africa, Africa as a whole receives less than 2% of foreign direct investment across the world. A survey of 20 Poverty Reduction Strategy Papers prepared by countries across Africa found that most neglect to consider energy or individual energy access as an integral part of their development strategy. Trans-national initiatives play an important role in development for the entire region too. One example of international cooperation for energy development is the Chad-Cameroon pipeline.

Additionally, "The United States announced USD $2 billion in grants, loans and loan guarantees across U.S. government agencies and departments for capacity-building projects, policy and regulatory development, public-private partnerships, and loan guarantees to leverage private investment in clean energy technologies."

Eskom and Duke Energy currently support an initiative to facilitate an electrical roadmap in Southern Africa. "The goal is to connect 500 million people to modern energy service by 2025".

=== Privatization ===
==== Advantages ====
Economic reasoning predicts increased efficiency and lower government overhead from a private contractor. Privatized Northern Electricity in Namibia implemented improved billing and reduced losses to lower the required energy tariff and lower energy prices. Private companies can also work closely with government to provide the social benefits of a state utility in the short term and the competition of a private market for the long term. South Africa commercialized the formerly public utility Eskom, but worked with them to continue grid expansion. The South African government helps fund new connections and subsidizes the first 100kWh per month for poor households, up from a previous 50kWh per month. By 2005 South Africa's electrification rate had increased to about 70% (from 30% in 1990).

==== Disadvantages ====
Privatization can lead to price increases if the market is not otherwise profitable. An unregulated or lightly regulated market could tend towards proven profitable customers too, ignoring riskier opportunities to expand service to rural or poor customers. Extending the electrical grid becomes difficult because of the high upfront investments required to serve a low population density. According to the Forum of Energy Ministers of Africa, most rural customers can't even afford the install costs of the most basic single phase circuit with an electrical socket. Energy subsidies are one possible solution, but they can disproportionately effect demographics who already have access to electricity, missing the most poor.

=== Program management reform ===
Most development initiatives work at the individual project level, leading to fragmentation and inconsistency between projects that discourage long term investors. Institutional reform is vital to improving the operating efficiency of the electrical sector as a whole. The current hybrid public/private model lacks a clear leading organization with one clear vision of the system's future. Attempts to negotiate management contracts over utility hardware have generally failed, leaving the public utility still burdened with day-to-day hardware support as well as growth, planning, and development. Of 17 high-profile African energy management contracts, four were cancelled before they even reached full term, five were not renewed after only one cycle, and five more were dropped in later years. Only three remain in place today.

Smart utility management must meet increased investment in the middle to smartly allocate resources and develop a sustainable grid model. Of the current utilities, "On average, Africa's state-owned power utilities embody only 40% of good governance practices for such enterprise".

Nevertheless, federal support for energy is gaining momentum, especially in Southern Africa. South Africa's government has established a Joint Implementation Committee to progress the biodiesel industry. This committee encompasses a variety of sub-committees, like "South Renewable Energy Technologies for Poverty Alleviation South Africa: Solar Water Heaters and Biodiesel," and the "African Petroleum Industry Association. Plans for the promotion of harvest to create bioethanol are underway, the South African Bureau of Standards is developing pricing models to enable economic growth.

"The World Bank and the International Finance Corporation will expand existing programs such as Lighting Africa, which develops off-grid lighting markets, to provide affordable lighting to 70 million low-income households by 2020, as well as undertake new initiatives with the Energy Sector Management Assistance Program, such as mapping of renewable energy resources".

The Global Ministerial Environment Forum in Nairobi, Kenya was broadcast throughout Africa, and comprised a panel of energy experts who discussed the successes achieved in energy in Africa so far, lessons learned from implementations, and future projections for energy.

Moreover, the United Nations Development Program and UN Capital Development Fund recently initiated a global Clean Start program, which will enable millions of impoverished people both in Africa and in Asia to shift out of energy poverty by creating microfinance opportunities to encourage poorer individuals to purchase and utilize electricity. Twenty-five countries in Africa have joined this global task: Botswana, Burundi, Burkina Faso, Cape Verde, Côte d'Ivoire, Democratic Republic of Congo, Ethiopia, Gambia, Ghana, Guinea, Kenya, Lesotho, Liberia, Malawi, Mozambique, Namibia, Nigeria, São Tomé and Príncipe, Senegal, Sierra Leone, Tanzania, Togo, Uganda, Zambia, and Zimbabwe.

== Future development ==
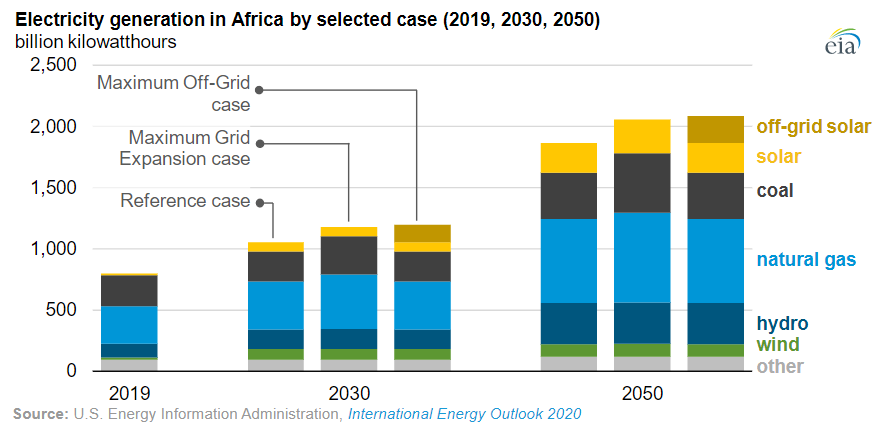
Projections, as of 2020, for growth in the African energy market, depending on electric grid and off-grid investments

=== Projected needs ===
Creating an effective and far-reaching modern electrical system in Africa will take significant investment. The African Development Bank has estimated that a universal access system for all 53 countries in Africa would cost US$547 billion total to implement by 2030, which averages to US$27 billion per year. Total investment has not come close to this mark, instead hovering until recently between $1–2 billion USD annually. Recent participation from China and India on the order of US$2 Billion annually brings the investment total up to ~US$4 billion. The power sector still faces a finance gap on the order of US$23 billion per year though, severely constraining its development options. Operating at 1/4 of the necessary budget to grow and expand, current networks must mark most funds for maintenance of aging existing systems.

=== A sample of current investments ===
The World Bank operates a portfolio of 48 Sub-Saharan Africa energy projects with over US$3 billion in investment. Individual governments as well as private entities also contribute to overall energy projects. China and India have recently emerged as large players in the space, committing US$2 billion annually to new development projects. China focused specifically on 10 large hydropower projects, which combined are expected to produce another 6,000 MW of electrical energy. This is estimated to increase the hydroelectric capabilities of Sub-Saharan Africa by 30%. Another project currently undergoing feasibility exploration would install hydroelectric facilities on the Zambezi river, potentially generating 2,000–2,500 MW. Smaller scale projects also receive funding, such as efforts to distribute safe cookstoves and efficient kilns to lower the effects of biomass, initiatives to improve lighting efficiency, or smaller scale microgrid electrical distributions.

=== Regional pools ===
One characterizing feature of the electrical grid in Africa is its isolation. The formation of regional energy trading pools would help stabilize energy markets, but would require building out a transmission line infrastructure between countries. Installing those resources would be expected to require ~US$19 billion in investment. Regional energy trade would save an estimated US$5 billion annually in emergency generation costs, yielding a 22% rate of return even at 5% deflation. Energy economist Orvika Rosnes estimates that fair regional pooling in the least developed countries could actually generate money in less than one year, with a 168% annual return on investment.

=== Lack of data availability ===
Many African countries lack consistent, detailed and up-to-date electricity data. Common issues include long publication lags, infrequent updates, limited fuel disaggregation and missing data on imports, losses or consumption. Out of 54 countries evaluated by energy think tank Ember, 23 (42%) had only very old national data available, or nothing at all. South Africa is a notable exception, providing near-real-time supply and demand data. Stronger data reporting is essential for tracking progress, informing energy investment.

== See also ==
- Mains electricity by country
- Renewable energy in Africa
