= Poverty Reduction Strategy in Honduras =

The Poverty Reduction Strategy (PRS) is a country-based process which leads to the formation of a Poverty Reduction Strategy Paper. The paper is then presented to major donors such as the International Monetary Fund (IMF) and the World Bank for approval. Approval allows foreign aid to be given to the country. Approval was given to Honduras on August 20, 2001. Honduras' goal was to reduce the rate of poverty in the nation from 70 percent to 40 percent by 2015. The PRS was a continuation of the "Master Plan for Reconstruction and National Transformation." The PRS had an annual budget of 4.4 million Honduran lempiras which was distributed in about 300 million lempira lots to each of 18 of the Honduran Government departments. The funds were to be used for specific projects aimed at benefiting communities.

== History ==
In 1999, 66 percent of Hondurans were poor. At that time, it was expected that an investment of $2.6 million US dollars would reduce this figure by 42 percent. A broad framework for reduction of poverty in Honduras was developed in consultation with the Honduran people. It was felt that consultation with the people was essential for community ownership and this in turn was essential for the strategy's long term sustainability. The broad framework was developed through a participatory process between January 2000 and May 2001. 3,500 people representing community organisations participated. In many cases, the representatives brought with them mandates which were based on grassroots consultations with their members.

== Strategies ==
The PRS covered a number of areas. In the area of education and literacy, the PRS aimed to have 70 percent of children completing year 10 (junior) at secondary school by 2015. In the area of diet and nutrition, the PRS aimed to reduce childhood malnutrition; and provide access to potable water to 95 percent of the population. In the area of communication, the PRS planned to provide electricity to eighty percent of the general population; and provide landlines to at least 15 percent of the population. The PRS also aimed for Honduras to reach a score of 0.77 in an index of relative human development with respect to gender equality. Under the PRS, at least 20 percent of Honduran forest would be protected from clearing.

== Finance ==
The PRS received an investment of US$2,666 million (53 billion Honduran lempiras) distributed over 15 years. That is, four billion lempiras per annum. Each department received about 300 million lempiras per annum. The funding came from the government and from the income of privatized entities. A PRS advisory board administered the funds with 1.55 percent allocated to economic development, 2.35 percent to education, health and cultural projects and 3.10 percent allocated to the development of public institutions and governance.

The funding was supervised by representatives of the executive branch of the Honduran government; the PRS advisory board; the Fund for the Reduction of Poverty (FRP); members of the technical support unit (UNAT); members of the National Management Evaluation System (SINEG); the National Institute of Statistics (INE); the Unit for Efficiency and Transparency (UPET); local government; private institutions; and non-government organisations.

== Result ==
In 2011, the PRS had been ineffectual in reducing poverty and outcomes were worse than prior to its implementation. From 2011 to 2012, rates of poverty in Honduras rose by five percent.

== Transparency ==
Initially, the PRS website documented the project's spending but in 2010, the website was removed.

== See also ==
- Economy of Honduras
- Poverty Reduction Strategy Paper
