= Mohammed Mulibah Sherif =

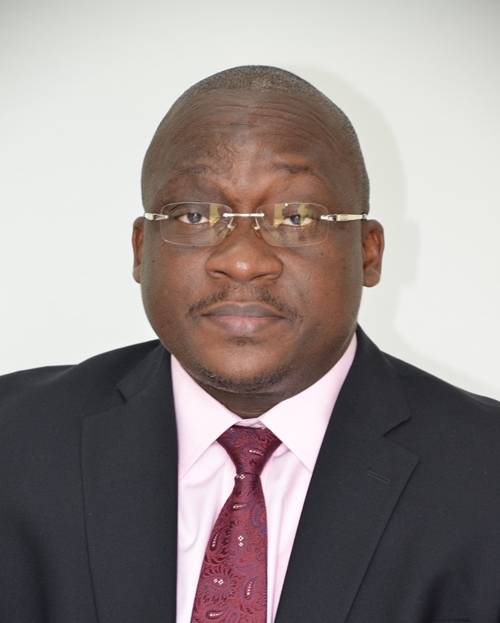
- Born: April 16, 1975 (age 51); Voinjama, Lofa County
- Education: Usmanu Danfodiyu University (BSc), UN Institute for Economic Development and Planning (MA)
- Occupation: Economist
- Website: transcoclsg.org

Mohammed Mulibah Sherif (born 16 April 1975) is the General Manager of regional transmission company TRANSCO CLSG (Côte d'Ivoire, Liberia, Sierra Leone, Guinee) based in Abidjan, Côte d'Ivoire. He is an economist and project management specialist. He is recognized for his role in Liberia’s debt relief through the Heavily Indebted Poor Countries (HIPC) process and also for helping to stabilize the Liberian economy from the effects of a prolonged civil conflict. He is married with five children.

Sherif is former Chief Economist of the Republic of Liberia and is credited for coordinating several project activities that yielded dividends for the implementation of Liberia’s foremost development agenda - Agenda for Transformation. He successfully coordinated activities of the Macro Fiscal Unit at the Ministry of Finance, Republic of Liberia. He is a graduate from the Usmanu Danfodiyo University from 1999 to 2002, where he earned a Bachelor of Arts Degree with concentration in Statistics.

Sherif also provided leadership on several high-level meetings for the Government of Liberia including the West African Monetary Zone (WAMZ), the spring and annual meetings of the World Bank and International Monetary Fund (IMF). He traveled extensively on behalf of the Government of Liberia on several high-level conferences/meetings which brought in financial resources to boost development in the post-conflict country.

== Early childhood, education & experience ==
On April 16, 1975, Mohammed Mulbah Sherif was born in Voinjama, Lofa County, Liberia to the late Mr. and Mrs. Mulibah Sherif. He spent his early childhood years in Yekepa, Nimba County where he also started his formal education at the St. Francis Elementary school and the United Muslim Junior high school.

Following the Civil War in 1990, Mohammed Sherif moved to Monrovia, the Liberian capital and attended the College of West Africa in 1994. He later fled to Nigeria as a result of the outbreak of war on April 6, 1996. While in Nigeria, he attended the Usmanu Danfodiyo University from 1999 to 2002, earning a Bachelor of Arts Degree in Statistics. He moved to Ghana and spent a year before returning to Liberia in 2004, and started work at the Ministry of Finance from 2004 - 2006 as an Administrative Assistant and then Economist.

In November 2006, Mohammed Sherif pursued his graduate studies in Economic Policy and Management at the UN Institute for Economic Development and Planning, Dakar, Senegal where he earned an MA Degree in Economic Policy and Management in 2008. After graduating, he was recruited as Senior Economist from November 2008 to August 2010 with the African Development Bank (AfDB) Institutional Support program to the Ministry of Finance of Liberia. He was subsequently promoted as Principal Economist in August 2010 to January 2012. Sherif received professional training from a host of Universities including Duke University, USA; Harvard School of professional Education, USA; IMF Institute, USA; World Bank Institute in Washington DC, USA; He taught Business Statistics for four years and Public Finance for one year at the University of Liberia graduate program in Public Financial Management.

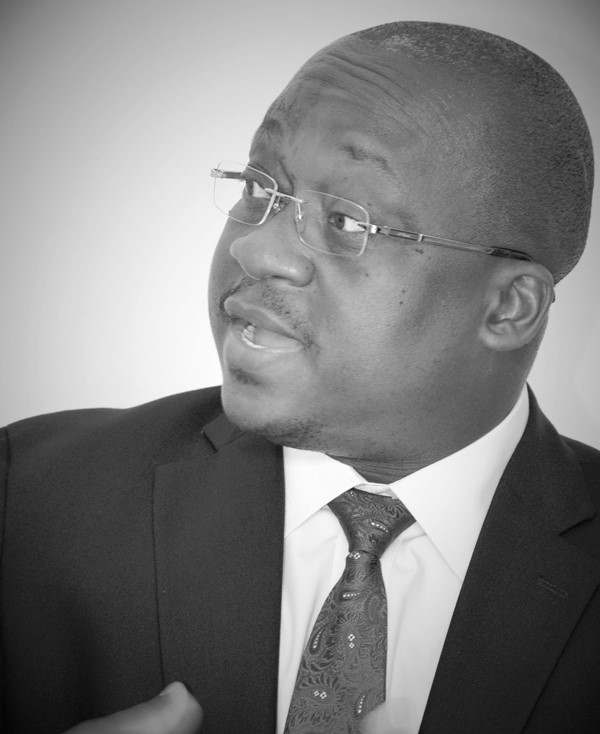
Mohammed M. Sherif

Before ascending to his new position as General Manager of TRANSCO CLSG in September 2014, Mohammed Sherif worked as Chief Economist of Liberia at the Ministry of Finance from February 2012 – June 2014. In his professional career at the Ministry of Finance, Liberia, he played key role in the development of successful strategic programs in Liberia including the Poverty Reduction Strategy Paper (2008–2011), Agenda for Transformation (2012–2017), Liberia Public Finance Law of 2009 and took a technical lead role in the development of five Budget Framework Papers that underpinned Liberia's medium term budgets beginning fiscal year 2010/2011 up to 2014/15. Mohammed Sherif also worked on the Medium Term Debt Management Strategy of 2013, and Risks Analysis Strategy for budget execution of 2013/14. He served as the Energy sector focal person at the Ministry of Finance from 2008–2014.

Mohammed Sherif also effectively coordinated the reporting requirements of the International Monetary Fund (IMF), Poverty Reduction and Growth Facility/Extended Credit Facility Program in Liberia from 2008 that led to Liberia achieving debt waiver under the Heavily Indebted Poor countries process in 2010. He also coordinated negotiations of a new IMF ECF program covering 2013–2015. He was involved in the preparation of various country Assistance strategies from 2009 to 2013, with multilateral institutions including the World Bank and the African Development Bank (AfDB). He directly participated in the negotiations of many credit agreements for Liberia including International Development Association (IDA) credits.

As the General Manager of TRANSCO CLSG,
