= Energy poverty and gender =

Energy poverty, the inability of a household to secure a socially and materially necessary level of domestic energy services, affects women and men differently. In developing countries, poor women and girls living in rural areas are significantly affected, because they are usually responsible for providing the primary energy for households. In developed countries, older women living alone are the most affected, because of low incomes and high energy costs.

In developing countries, energy poverty usually means lacking electricity or clean cooking facilities; in developed countries it usually means being unable to afford adequate heating, cooling and lighting. In 2024, an estimated 655 million people had no access to electricity, more than 560 million of them in sub-Saharan Africa, and about two billion cooked with polluting fuels and technologies.

Women and children do most fuel and water collection in households without modern energy. World Health Organization survey data from 13 countries found that girls in sub-Saharan African homes using polluting cookstoves spend about 18 hours a week collecting fuel or water, compared with 15 hours for boys. In homes that mainly use cleaner stoves and fuels, the figures are 5 and 2 hours.

== In developing countries ==
=== Domestic responsibilities ===
In developing countries, energy poverty has significant gender characteristics. Women living in rural areas are usually responsible for housework, including gathering fuel and water, cooking and farming.

=== Health impacts from energy consumption ===
Energy poverty in rural households causes health problems for women and children. One is indoor air pollution from traditional stoves. The World Health Organization estimates that household air pollution, mostly from cooking with solid fuels and kerosene, caused about 2.9 million deaths in 2021, including more than 309,000 children under five. Women and children carry the largest share of this burden because they do most of the cooking and fuel collection. Other health risks come from the heavy workload of collecting fuel and from malnutrition. Scarcity of fuel also makes households less likely to boil water, which may increase the risk of water-borne diseases.

Reliable electricity is needed to light deliveries, run medical equipment, and refrigerate blood and vaccines, and its absence makes night-time and emergency obstetric care, including caesarean sections, harder to provide. About 15% of health-care facilities in sub-Saharan Africa have no electricity at all, and only half of the region's hospitals have a reliable supply.

=== Time poverty ===
Collecting fuel takes time away from school, paid work and rest, which is sometimes called "time poverty". In sub-Saharan African homes using polluting cookstoves, girls spend about 18 hours a week collecting fuel or water and boys about 15.

=== Participation in decision-making ===
A 2019 study of solar lantern sales in Tanzania reported that men usually made household decisions about buying energy devices.

=== Education ===
Energy poverty affects teaching and learning. Lack of access to energy reduces children's performance and attendance.

== In developed countries ==
In developed countries, the group most affected is older women living alone. Women live longer than men on average, so they make up a larger share of older people living alone, and their pensions tend to be lower because many spent fewer years in paid work. Energy poverty in developed countries is driven mainly by rising energy prices, low incomes and energy-inefficient housing. A 2019 study by Caitlin Robinson examined the relationship between energy poverty in England and unpaid caring roles, exclusion from paid work, health and gaps in social protection, and concluded that the effects are best studied at the level of individual households.

== Responses ==
The United Nations Development Programme has argued that cleaner household energy technologies would cut the time women spend collecting fuel and reduce their exposure to smoke from burning biomass. A study of Solar Sister, a women-run solar lantern enterprise in Tanzania, found that the lanterns had positive effects on household savings, health, education and women's economic productivity. A 2004 discussion paper by Elizabeth Cecelski argued that technology alone is not enough and that energy programmes work better when local women are involved in designing them. A 2019 literature review by Pueyo and Maestre found that electrification increased women's access to paid work, but by less than it did for men, and that the jobs women gained tended to be lower quality.
