= Shoulder to Shoulder's role in education in Honduras =

Shoulder to Shoulder (StoS) or Hombro a Hombro is a grassroots, community-based, non-profit non-governmental organization (NGO) registered in Honduras since 1996. The organisation develops and improves health and education programs, aiming to help poor Hondurans achieve quality health care and sustained social development. To date, StoS has created and continued to provide some notable educational programs.

== Library Program ==
Reading materials in Honduran schools are very limited and students are prohibited from even touching the few storybooks which must be kept in the possession of the teacher at all times. To address this situation, the StoS library program was started in 2007. With around 75 donated books housed in the Santa Lucía, Intibucá clinic, StoS sought to provide an avenue for children to engage in creative learning through books. Eventually, the library expanded to include an exercise class, English lessons, movie night, and a book club for young adults.

A newer and bigger library was subsequently built in the same area in March 2009, which contains storage closets, bathrooms, a computer lab with online research capabilities, crafts, games, toys and books. A borrowing system was also established. Activities such as story hour, geography club and a life skills course for scholarship students are conducted weekly. Overall, the StoS library program has and will continue to benefit the cognitive learning abilities of the Honduran community.

== Girls’ Leadership Project (Yo Puedo) ==
The aim of this project was to help promote the role of females in Honduran society. StoS first trained a group of Honduran teachers, using Training of Trainers (TOT) sessions that emphasized enhancing the socio-economic capital of poor women in the surrounding poorest communities. The women are seldom educated beyond third grade and almost never beyond sixth grade. The teachers would impart their knowledge to, and guide, the selected Honduran girls, so that the girls could apply this knowledge to the initiation and undertaking of small-scale, home-based businesses that meet community needs. This helps to develop the girls’ self-esteem and groom their potential as leaders.

The results of Yo Puedo were very encouraging. In addition to the gains in specific skills from the different projects that girls undertook, they also became more outgoing and spontaneous. Expressing more interest and performing better in their academics, almost all showcased a desire to continue their education beyond sixth grade. Communication between the community and the school increased too, due to the enhanced social involvement of the female students. Most importantly, there was a change in gender perceptions by the males: boys, who were initially upset about the program, gradually supported and even volunteered for it.

Sustained effort and interest in the project is achieved through ongoing one-on-one consultations between teachers and girls in various schools, as well as continuous participation from US volunteers. Girls are also re-investing their earnings to continue the program.

== Limitations of Projects ==
StoS’s projects focus mainly on tackling the issue of quality and quantity of education in Honduras, but other major obstacles to obtaining education in the country still remain, namely family poverty, indigenous discrimination and gender inequality.
