= Challenges in the Honduran Education System =

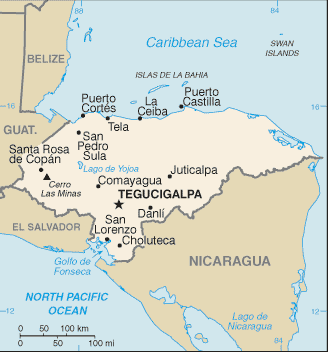
Map of Honduras Showing All 18 Departments of the Country

== Honduran Education System ==
Public education in Honduras is controlled by the state and under the general direction of the Secretary of Public Education, who is appointed by the president. The major supervisory responsibilities of the schools in the country are also managed and inspected by the National Council of Education.

== Structure of the Education System ==
The education system in Honduras is characterized by five stages of formal education; PrePrimary, Primary, Middle, Secondary, and Tertiary. Public education in Honduras is provided free for children aged 6 to 15 where it is mandatory for children to attend at the primary level (Age 6 to 12). The Honduran Constitution, moreover, stipulates that parents have the right to choose the education; whether free or private, of their children.

To emphasize more important statistics of the country, the total population by 2024 is of 10,825,603 individuals. Additionally, 15.7% of the population lives on less than $3 per day.

In Honduras, children are also being forced to leave school due to needing to support families. That is why for more than 80% of Hondurans, the level of education reached by many parents is low due to not having secure living conditions.

More than 90% of students in Honduras need to repeat grades. This is seen in 10 out of 18 departments of the country. 13.5% of the population do not have access to education, and only 30% go to High School.

== Education infrastructure ==
The quality of the curriculum in Honduran public schools is poor, evidenced by the fact that for much of the last century, Honduran students were required to memorize useless or impractical data at the expense of sharpening their reasoning powers and critical thinking skills. Teachers are paid low wages, they do not have access to effective teaching materials, and they are not trained in the latest technologies and current teaching methods. In addition, there is a scarcity of teachers, with a teacher:student ratio of 1:33 in 2008. The destruction of over 3000 schools nationwide caused by Hurricane Mitch further weakened the country’s poor education infrastructure.

== Political context ==
Honduras confronted a military coup, or the removal of President Manuel Zelaya from power, in 2009. As a result, the national public education system began to face challenges of not having their finances come from the central Ministry of Education offices in Tegucigalpa but from each school’s corresponding municipal government. This meant that the teachers actively sought funds from private businesses or nongovernmental organizations.

In 2012 a new law was incorporated, called the Basic Law of Education. Its purpose was to incorporate multiple practices for a successful education system in the country, with a more modern educational system. Its priority was to show education was a human right as it tried to create a system and practice of education specifically focused on helping the students' needs. This law gave more significant delivery of the education system in Honduras. Even though this law did show some improvement, currently the Honduran education system continues to face challenges, more specifically with its success in providing human capital to reduce the differences in living standards between the rich and the poor of all Hondurans. That is why the problem in education is increasing among public education, more and more each year.

== Major Challenges in Education ==
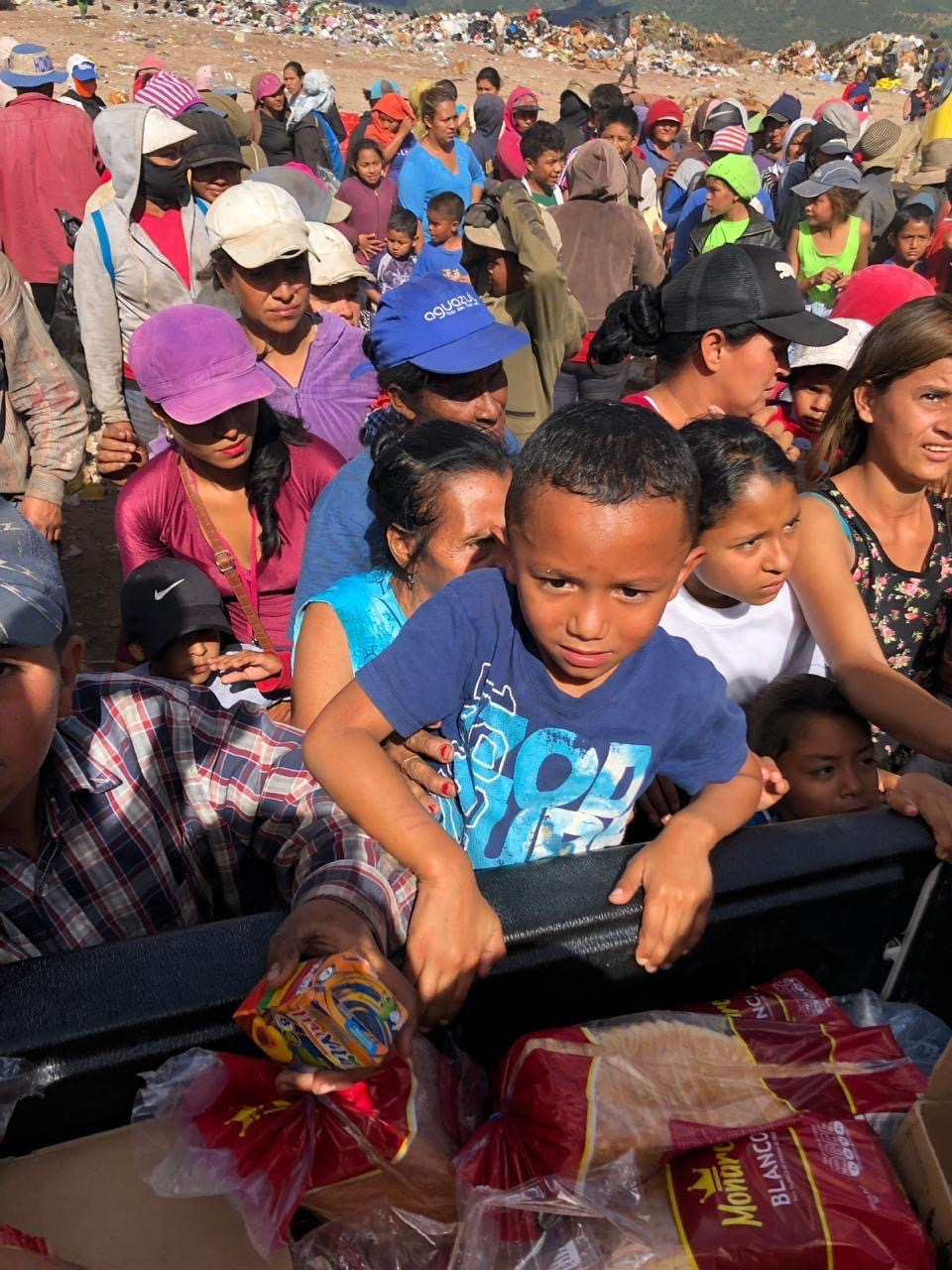
Extreme Poverty in Honduras

== Poverty ==
Poverty is rife in Honduras, with the poverty headcount ratio at national poverty line standing at 60% as of 2010. In typical situations, children have to quit school permanently to work at an early age to help support their families. Even though school is fully state-subsidized up till the 5th grade, many children are still unable to attend school because their families can not afford to buy uniforms and school supplies. A study conducted in 2006 by National Institute of Statistics estimated that as many as 368,000 of the 1.7 million children ages five to 12 did not receive schooling in that year.

== Gender inequality ==
Honduras is a patriarchal society, and males are favoured over females when it comes to education. While parents may send both genders to primary school; the females are likely the first to be withdrawn to help at home and made to work to provide income. This is further supported by the belief that occupational opportunities resulting from education are greater for males. Even when they have the same education level, females have greater difficulty in finding jobs that match their academic credentials. Both genders have equal access to the limited available educational facilities; however, attendance rates for females were slightly lower than for males.

== Globalization and Privatization ==
An approach called Critical International Political Economy (CIPE) creates the idea that political and economic globalization and privatization have affected the policymaking and the supply of the Honduran education. Honduras is a clear example of showing that many global industries and groups, as well as private organizations, have had a huge impact on the enforced laws and policies of the schools. Furthermore, the Honduran state in general has weakened and lost its power with education throughout time. That is why over the years there has been a lot of access to globalization and privatization, due to the fact that the state continues to depend more on external factors and finance rather than using its own resources to establish a stable educational system. This is also due to the fact that Honduras is highly and structurally dependent on international cooperation funds, loans and donations from national and international organizations.

== Education in Rural Areas of Country ==
In the rural areas of Honduras, the quality of education is low. Only 51% of children that are registered in school complete primary school. Education quality decreased by 2025, after the pandemic, as it was projected that more than one million children and adolescents will be outside the educational system. It was shown as the rate rose from 30% in 2014 to 37% in 2025—a trend that accelerated notably following the coronavirus pandemic crisis of 2020.” That is why there have been multiple projects trying to help improve education in those specific parts of the country. These include a project called RENACER (Rebirth for the Honduran Children) which was done by CARE Honduras. The project strives to address gendered barriers to education, trying to create opportunities for adolescents to positively participate in the social development in their communities.

This has also improved the safety and security of education in Honduras and also empowered women to attend school instead of staying at home from a young age, specifically those older girls in La Cuesta and Guajiquiro communities. CARE Honduras team was involved and also created a non-formal educational model called Educatodos(Education for all), who successfully linked youth groups to manage funds with other institutions, like UN Food and Agriculture Organization and the Honduran state’s Ministry of Ethnic Groups. In this way, new projects build their capacity for financial management, quality control of production, and market outreach.

== Community-Based Education Programs ==
Honduras education has received lots of help internationally to address its poor education. These include programs such as PROHECO (Proyecto Hondureño de Educación Comunitaria), financed by the World Bank (WB) and other countries, and EDUCO, which focus on improving access to education and try to foster community participation in school-related decision-making.

USAID (United States Agency for International Development), before it shut down, created multiple initiatives in order to improve the Honduran education system, including one done by the Frederick S. Pardee Center for International Futures at the University of Denver. The USAID foundation tried to improve the quality of education that each student receives in Central America, especially Honduras. The future goals and improvement of this initiative were having an “IFs Current Path scenario.” This model was an excellent way to demonstrate how the foundation works towards changing current policies and making improvements in the education system.

Also, many future scenarios have been established by the approach in order to improve the overall outcome of the Honduran education system. The first one is the SDG Achievement scenario, which is the most costly and challenging, allowing the full enrollment and graduation in primary and secondary schools, matching those of Costa Rica. The second scenario is the 5 years education push, which is less ambitious and focuses on improving the poor education quality as well as raising those enrollment rates in the public schools of Honduras.

These approaches are future investments that can be able to allow a greater quality and better academic success in Honduras. These future projects are the way the Honduran GDP would want to see a six percent and three percent boost, respectively, in the year 2040.
