= Outline of Honduras =

Country in Central America

The Flag of Honduras

The Coat of arms of Honduras

The location of Honduras

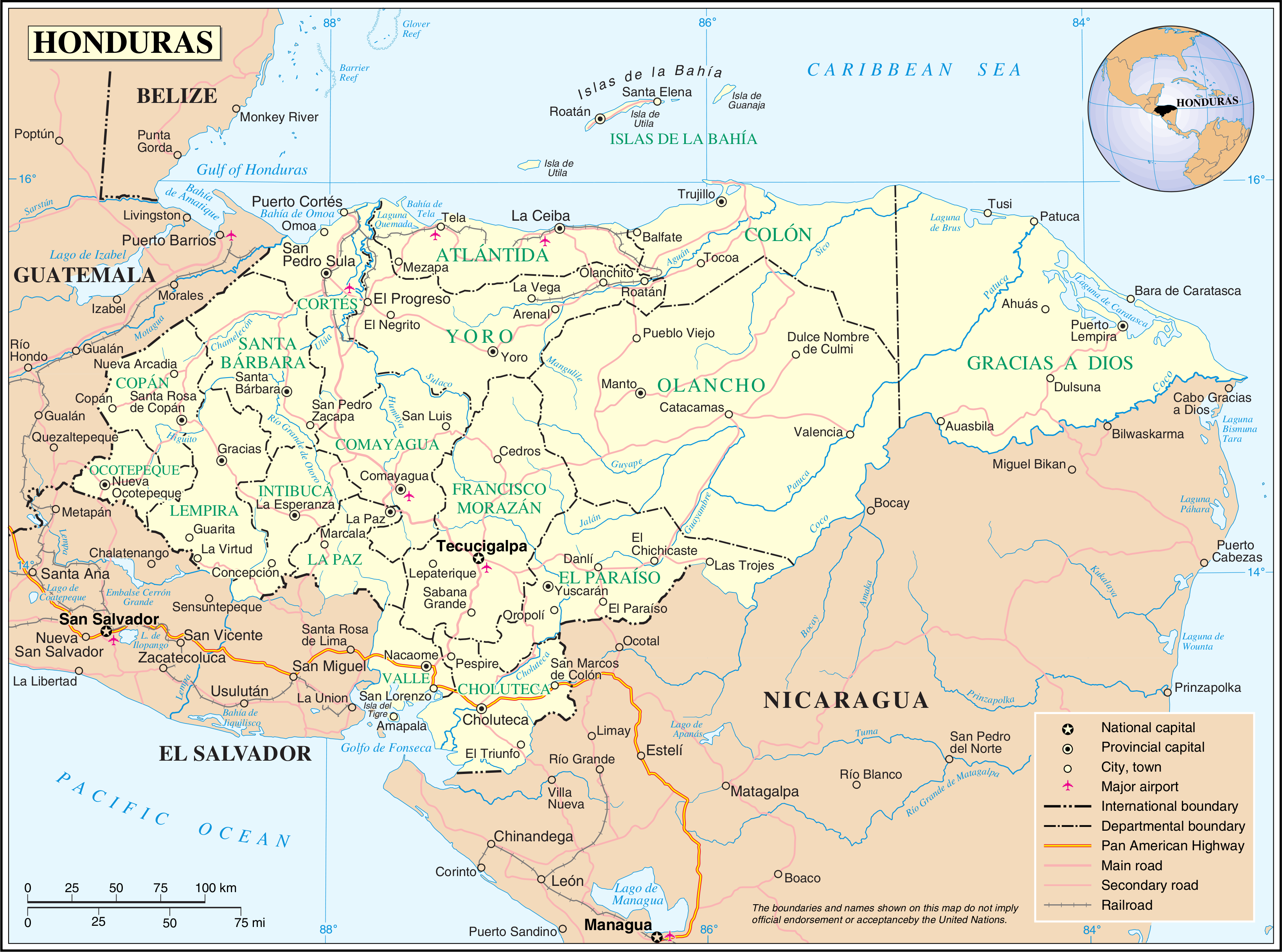
An enlargeable map of the Republic of Honduras

The following outline is provided as an overview of and topical guide to Honduras:

Honduras – sovereign country located in Central America. Honduras was formerly known as Spanish Honduras to differentiate it from British Honduras (now Belize). The country is bordered to the west by Guatemala, to the southwest by El Salvador, to the southeast by Nicaragua, to the south by the Pacific Ocean at the Gulf of Fonseca, and to the north by the Gulf of Honduras, a large inlet of the Caribbean Sea.

== General reference ==
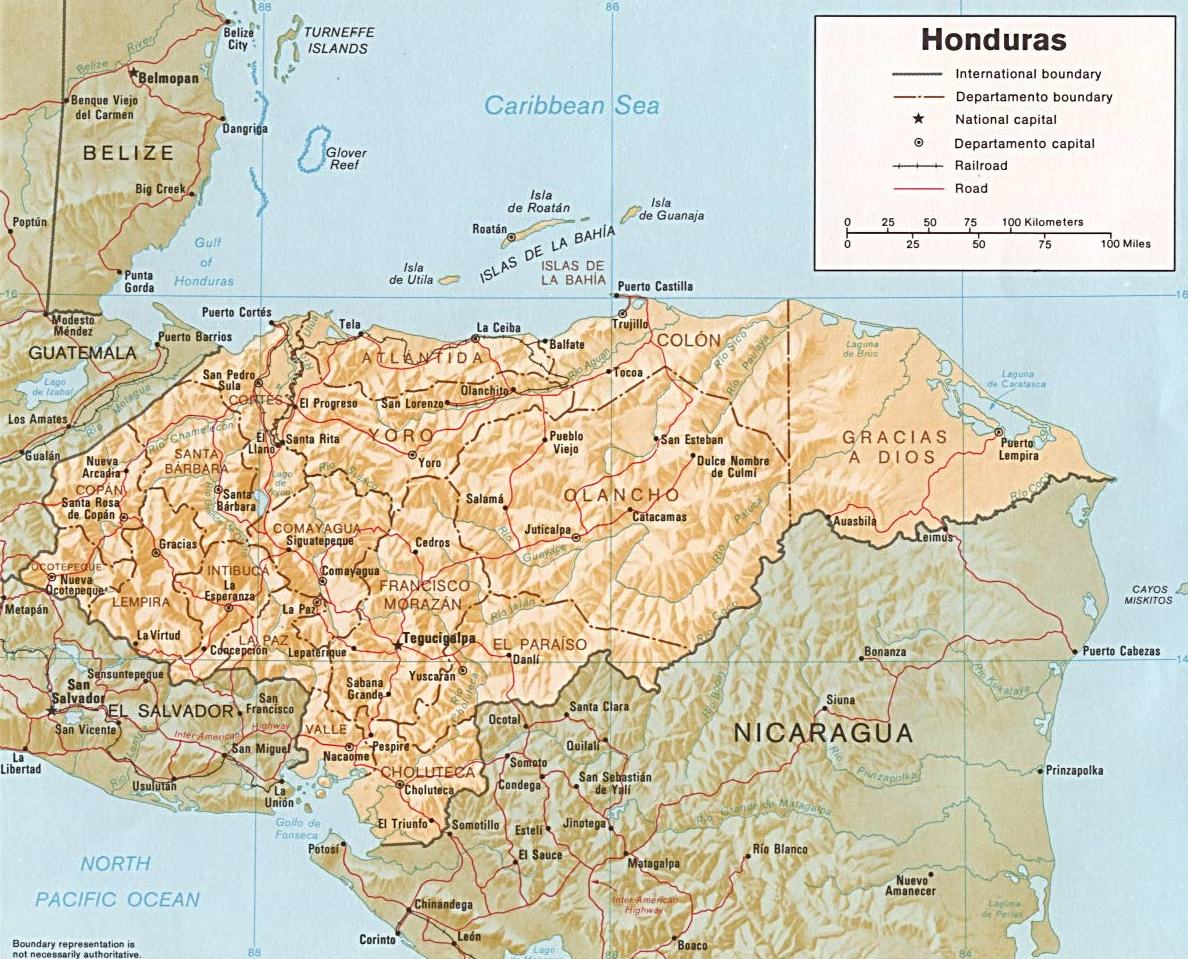
An enlargeable relief map of Honduras

- Pronunciation: /hɒnˈdjʊərəs/
- Common English country name: Honduras
- Official English country name: The Republic of Honduras
- Common endonym(s):
- Official endonym(s):
- Adjectival: Honduran
- Demonym(s):
- Etymology: Name of Honduras
- International rankings of Honduras
- ISO country codes: HN, HND, 340
- ISO region codes: See ISO 3166-2:HN
- Internet country code top-level domain: .hn

== Geography of Honduras ==
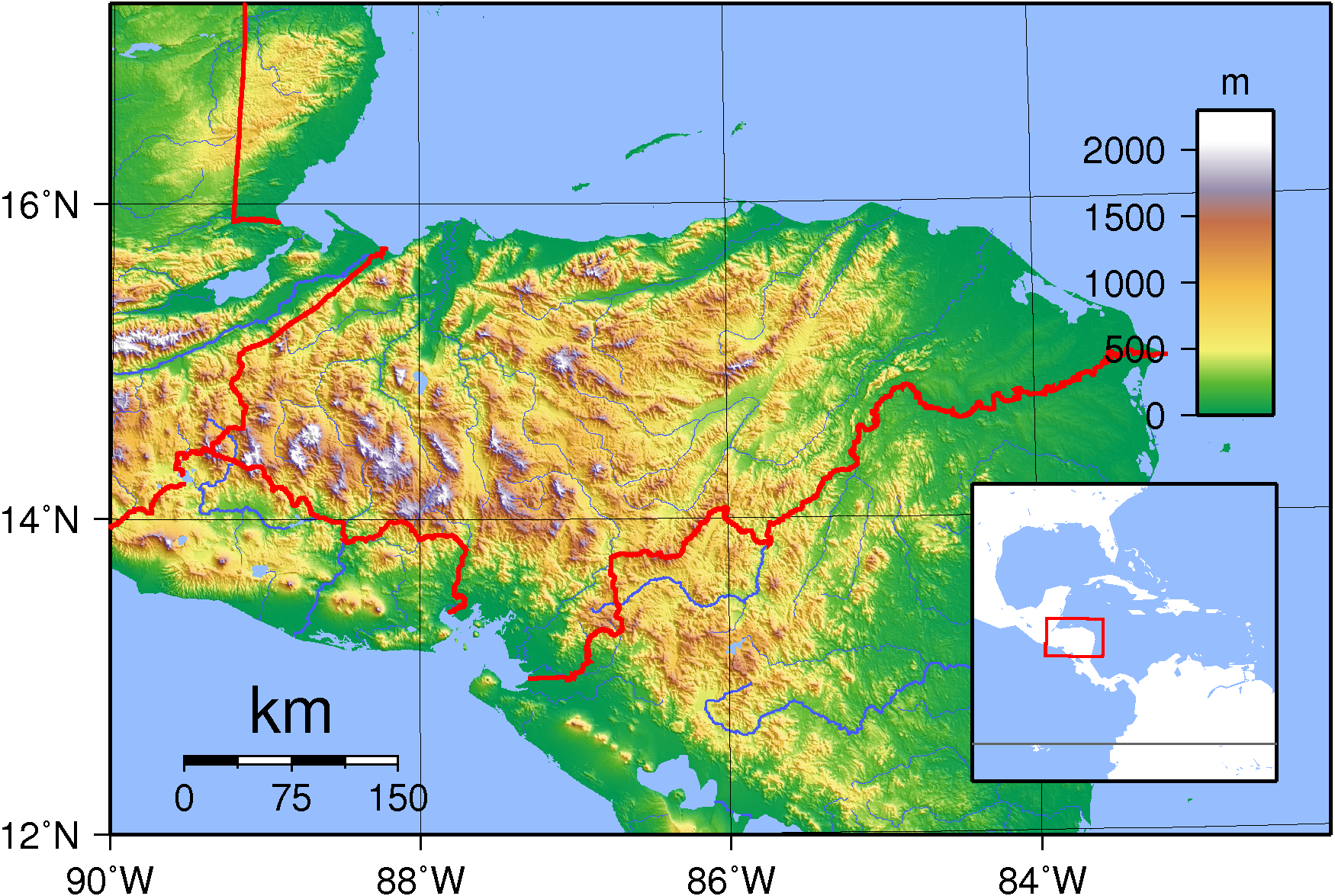
An enlargeable topographic map of Honduras

Geography of Honduras

- Honduras is: a country
- Location:
  - Northern Hemisphere and Western Hemisphere
    - Americas
      - North America
        - Middle America
          - Central America
  - Time zone: Central Standard Time (UTC-06)
  - Extreme points of Honduras
    - High: Cerro Las Minas 2,870 m (9,416 ft)
    - Low: Caribbean Sea and North Pacific Ocean 0 m
  - Land boundaries: 1,520 km

Nicaragua 922 km
El Salvador 342 km
Guatemala 256 km

- Coastline: 820 km

- Population of Honduras: 7,106,000 - 97th most populous country
- Area of Honduras: 112,492 km^{2}
- Atlas of Honduras

=== Environment of Honduras ===
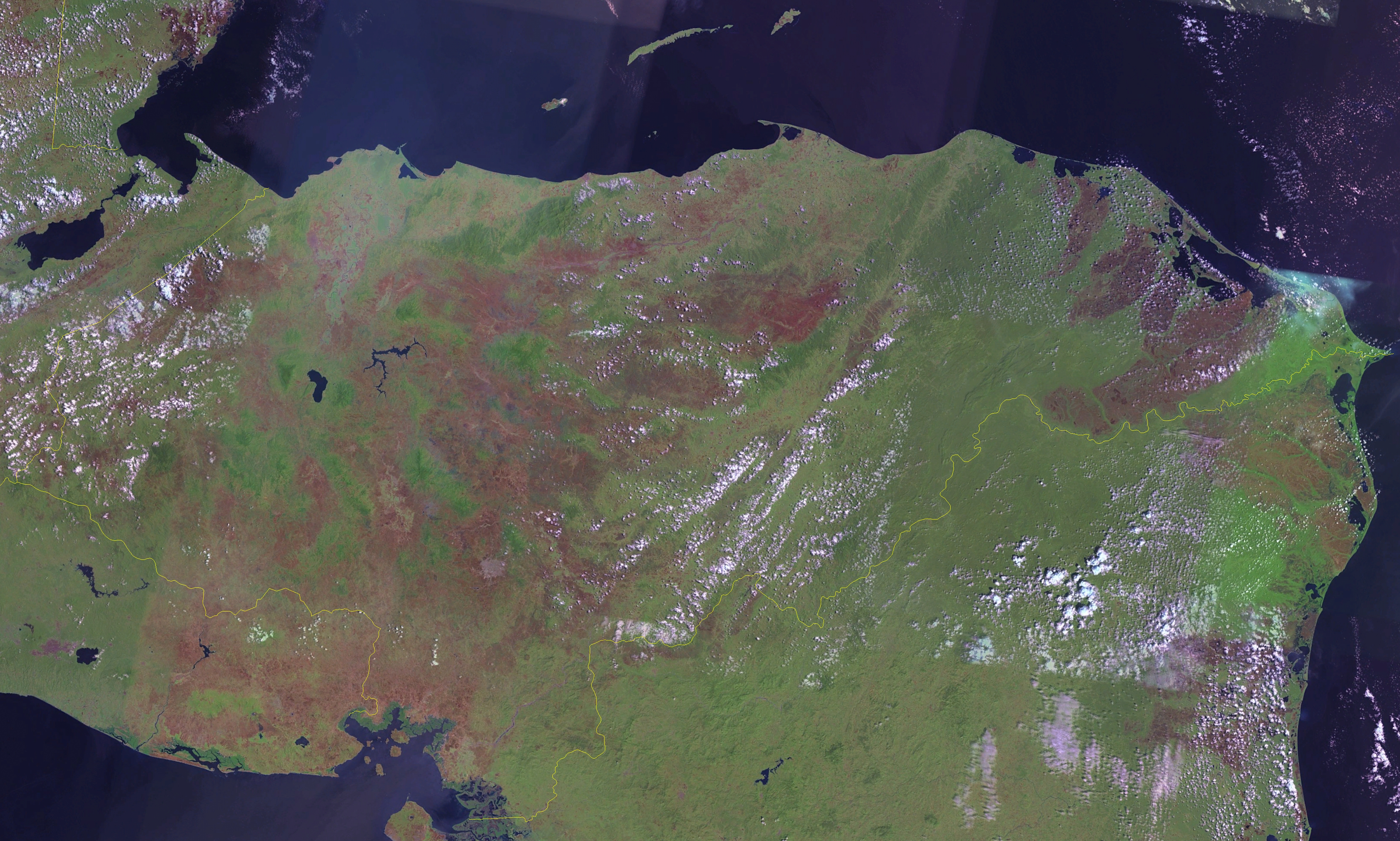
An enlargeable satellite image of Honduras

- Climate of Honduras
- Deforestation in Central America
- Renewable energy in Honduras
- Geology of Honduras
- Protected areas of Honduras
  - Biosphere reserves in Honduras
  - National parks of Honduras
- Wildlife of Honduras
  - Fauna of Honduras
    - Birds of Honduras
    - Mammals of Honduras

==== Natural geographic features of Honduras ====
- Fjords of Honduras
- Islands of Honduras
- Lakes of Honduras
- Mountains of Honduras
  - Volcanoes in Honduras
- Rivers of Honduras
  - Waterfalls of Honduras
- Valleys of Honduras
- World Heritage Sites in Honduras

=== Regions of Honduras ===
Regions of Honduras

==== Ecoregions of Honduras ====
List of ecoregions in Honduras

==== Administrative divisions of Honduras ====
Administrative divisions of Honduras

- Departments of Honduras
  - Municipalities of Honduras

===== Departments of Honduras =====
Departments of Honduras

===== Municipalities of Honduras =====
Municipalities of Honduras

- Cities of Honduras
- Capital of Honduras: Tegucigalpa

=== Demography of Honduras ===
Demographics of Honduras

== Government and politics of Honduras ==
Politics of Honduras

- Form of government: presidential representative democratic republic
- Capital of Honduras: Tegucigalpa
- Elections in Honduras
- Political parties in Honduras

=== Branches of the government of Honduras ===
Government of Honduras

==== Executive branch of the government of Honduras ====
- Head of state and Head of government: President of Honduras, Juan Orlando Hernández
- Cabinet of Honduras

==== Legislative branch of the government of Honduras ====
- National Congress of Honduras (unicameral)

==== Judicial branch of the government of Honduras ====
- Supreme Court of Honduras

=== Foreign relations of Honduras ===
Foreign relations of Honduras

- Diplomatic missions in Honduras
- Diplomatic missions of Honduras

==== International organization membership ====
International organization membership of Honduras The Republic of Honduras is a member of:

- Agency for the Prohibition of Nuclear Weapons in Latin America and the Caribbean (OPANAL)
- Central American Bank for Economic Integration (BCIE)
- Central American Common Market (CACM)
- Central American Integration System (SICA)
- Food and Agriculture Organization (FAO)
- Group of 77 (G77)
- Inter-American Development Bank (IADB)
- International Atomic Energy Agency (IAEA)
- International Bank for Reconstruction and Development (IBRD)
- International Civil Aviation Organization (ICAO)
- International Criminal Court (ICCt)
- International Criminal Police Organization (Interpol)
- International Development Association (IDA)
- International Federation of Red Cross and Red Crescent Societies (IFRCS)
- International Finance Corporation (IFC)
- International Fund for Agricultural Development (IFAD)
- International Labour Organization (ILO)
- International Maritime Organization (IMO)
- International Monetary Fund (IMF)
- International Olympic Committee (IOC)
- International Organization for Migration (IOM)
- International Organization for Standardization (ISO) (subscriber)
- International Red Cross and Red Crescent Movement (ICRM)
- International Telecommunication Union (ITU)
- International Telecommunications Satellite Organization (ITSO)
- International Trade Union Confederation (ITUC)
- Latin American Economic System (LAES)
- Latin American Integration Association (LAIA) (observer)
- Multilateral Investment Guarantee Agency (MIGA)
- Nonaligned Movement (NAM)
- Organisation for the Prohibition of Chemical Weapons (OPCW)
- Organization of American States (OAS)
- Permanent Court of Arbitration (PCA)
- Rio Group (RG)
- Unión Latina
- United Nations (UN)
- United Nations Conference on Trade and Development (UNCTAD)
- United Nations Educational, Scientific, and Cultural Organization (UNESCO)
- United Nations Industrial Development Organization (UNIDO)
- United Nations Mission for the Referendum in Western Sahara (MINURSO)
- Universal Postal Union (UPU)
- World Confederation of Labour (WCL)
- World Customs Organization (WCO)
- World Federation of Trade Unions (WFTU)
- World Health Organization (WHO)
- World Intellectual Property Organization (WIPO)
- World Meteorological Organization (WMO)
- World Tourism Organization (UNWTO)
- World Trade Organization (WTO)

=== Law and order in Honduras ===
Law of Honduras

- Capital punishment in Honduras
- Constitution of Honduras
- Crime in Honduras
- Human rights in Honduras
  - LGBT rights in Honduras
  - Freedom of religion in Honduras
- Law enforcement in Honduras

=== Military of Honduras ===
Military of Honduras

- Command
  - Commander-in-chief: Romeo Vásquez Velásquez
    - Ministry of Defence of Honduras
      - Minister of Defence of Honduras: Angel Edmundo Orellana Mercado
- Forces
  - Honduran Army
  - Honduran Navy
  - Honduran Air Force
- Military history of Honduras
- Military ranks of Honduras

=== Local government in Honduras ===
Departments of Honduras

== History of Honduras ==
History of Honduras

- Timeline of the history of Honduras
- Current events of Honduras
- Military history of Honduras

== Culture of Honduras ==
Culture of Honduras

- Architecture of Honduras
- Cuisine of Honduras
- Festivals in Honduras
- Languages of Honduras
- Media in Honduras
- National symbols of Honduras
  - Coat of arms of Honduras
  - Flag of Honduras
  - National anthem of Honduras
- Hondurans
- Prostitution in Honduras
- Public holidays in Honduras
- Records of Honduras
- Religion in Honduras
  - Buddhism in Honduras
  - Christianity in Honduras
  - Hinduism in Honduras
  - Islam in Honduras
  - Judaism in Honduras
  - Sikhism in Honduras
- World Heritage Sites in Honduras

=== Art in Honduras ===
- Art in Honduras
- Cinema of Honduras
- Literature of Honduras
- Music of Honduras
- Television in Honduras
- Theatre in Honduras

=== Sports in Honduras ===
Sports in Honduras

- Football in Honduras
- Honduras at the Olympics

== Economy and infrastructure of Honduras ==
Economy of Honduras

- Economic rank, by nominal GDP (2007): 107th (one hundred and seventh)
- Agriculture in Honduras
- Banking in Honduras
  - National Bank of Honduras
- Communications in Honduras
  - Internet in Honduras
- Companies of Honduras
- Currency of Honduras: Lempira
  - ISO 4217: HNL
- Energy in Honduras
- Honduras Stock Exchange
- Transport in Honduras
  - Airports in Honduras
  - Rail transport in Honduras
- Tourism in Honduras
- Water supply and sanitation in Honduras

== Education in Honduras ==
Education in Honduras

== See also ==
- List of Honduras-related topics
- Outline of Central America
- Outline of North America
