= Citizenship education (subject) =

Academic subject

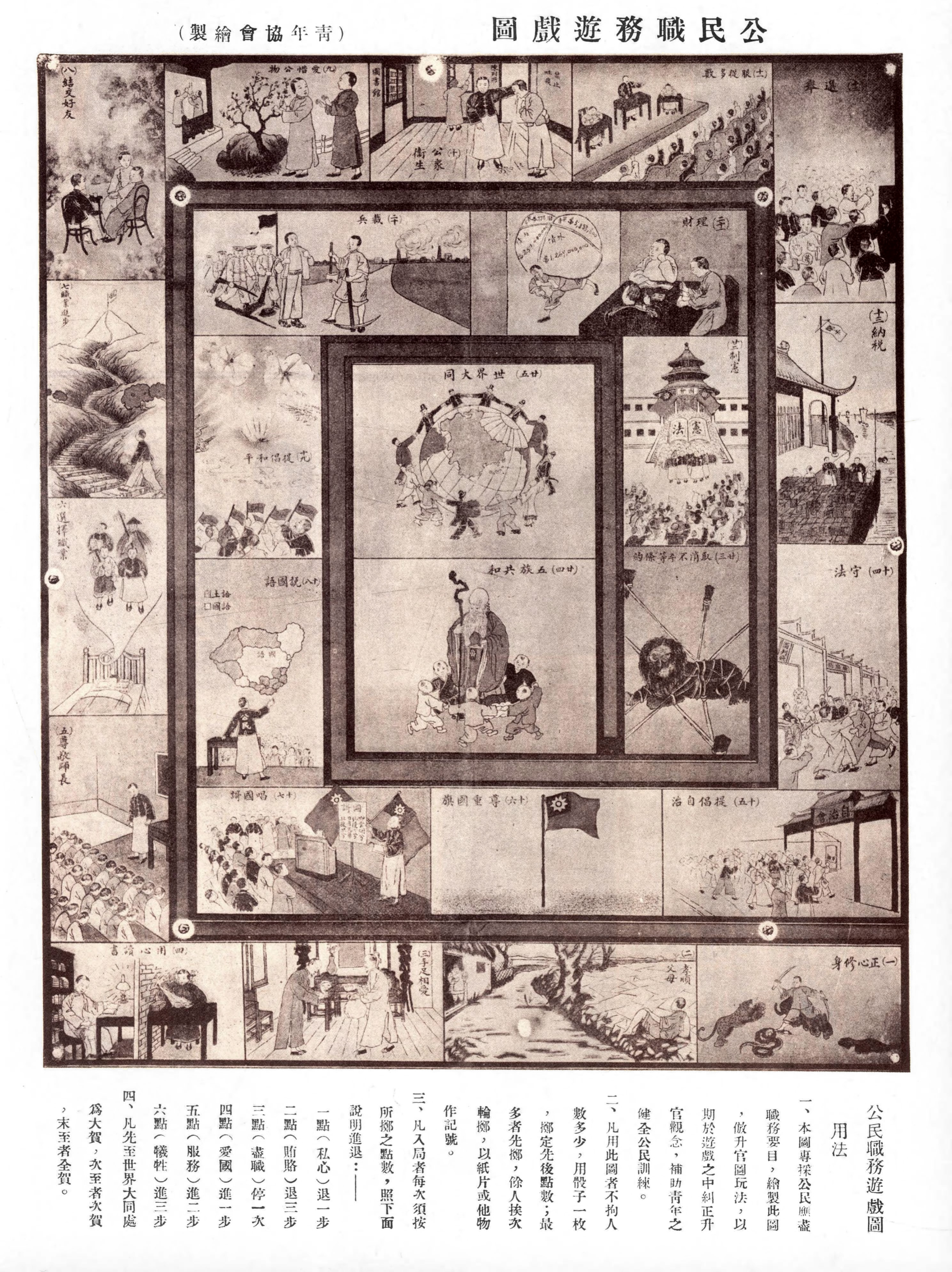
A board game designed for citizenship education published in The Young Companion, 1927

Citizenship education is taught in schools, as an academic subject similar to politics or sociology. It is known by different names in different countries – for example, 'citizenship education' (or just 'citizenship' for short) in the UK, ‘civics’ in the US, and 'education for democratic citizenship' in parts of Europe. The different names for the subject is mirrored in the different approaches towards citizenship education adopted in different countries. These are often a consequence of the unique historical and political developments within different countries.

In many countries, the focus of the teaching is on active citizenship. The purpose of "active citizenship" is to teach students to work together and take practical action, using their citizenship knowledge and understanding to contribute to a better society according to their political preferences.

== Countries ==
=== Australia ===
With Australia's compulsory voting and federal system, civics education has long been a concern for citizens to make informed democratic decisions. Therefore, as civics performance in schooling has been declining along with increased misinformation in online environments, there have been recommendations to make the subject nationally standardised, mandatory and engaging. Owing to Canberra's status as the national capital, it is a common school excursion destination and serves to educate students about Australia's democratic institutions.

=== England ===
Citizenship education has been a statutory subject in the English National Curriculum since 2001. It must be taught as part of the school curriculum to all pupils aged 11–16 years old in maintained schools in England. The current Programme of Study was introduced in 2014, and identifies four key areas in detail:

- Politics: Parliamentary democracy in the UK; Parliament, voting, elections, political parties; Influence of citizens through democratic processes; Other systems of government beyond the UK; UK relations with Europe, Commonwealth, wider world.
- Financial Skills: The functions and uses of money; Personal budgeting, money management; Wages, taxes, credit, debt, financial risk, financial products and services
- Volunteering: The ways a citizen can contribute to the improvement of their community; Opportunity to participate actively in community volunteering
- Law: The precious liberties enjoyed by citizens of the UK; Nature of rules and laws, criminal and civil law; The justice system; Diversity in the UK – need for mutual respect and understanding

==== History ====
Citizenship Education was introduced as a statutory subject in the English National Curriculum in 2001 following the recommendation of the Crick Report in 1998. This report, which had been commissioned by the New Labour government following its election victory in 1997, called for "no less than a change in the political culture of this country both nationally and locally: for people to think of themselves as active citizens, willing, able and equipped to have an influence in public life and with the critical capacities to weigh evidence before speaking and acting". Prior to this, since 1990, there had existed a cross curricular theme called 'Education for Citizenship' (CG8).

At the same time as the subject was introduced in 2001, a longitudinal study began. This studied the impacts of the teaching of citizenship over a 10-year timeframe. The curriculum was revised in 2007/8 to focus on the 'key concepts' of democracy and justice, rights and responsibilities, identities and diversity (living together in the UK); and 'key processes' of critical thinking and enquiry, advocacy and representation, and informed and responsible action. This version of the curriculum in particular was concerned with the practical side of citizenship – going beyond just the knowledge of institutions.

After the 2010 General Election, with the election of a new Coalition Government, a review was launched for the National Curriculum, including Citizenship. Despite early fears that the subject would be removed from the National Curriculum altogether, it was retained. However, a revised content was published which re-focused knowledge rather than skills and practice, with an emphasis on critical thinking, politics, media literacy, financial skills and money.

A GCSE in "Citizenship Studies" is available for students in Key Stage 4. The qualification includes a controlled assessment based on an active citizenship project they have taken part in. There is also an A-level subject in Citizenship Studies. This qualification is valued by leading universities including the University of Cambridge and University of Oxford.

Since 2017 there has been a sharp increase in entries for GCSE Citizenship Studies, with an 40% increase from 2017 to 2023.

=== Ireland ===
Citizenship studies was introduced as a compulsory subject in the 1990s in Ireland. It is known as CSPE (Civic, Social and Political Education) and is taught to 12- to 16-year-olds. In 2009 a subject titled 'Politics and Society' became offered as a subject to students between 16 and 18 years of age in secondary schools in the Republic of Ireland.

=== France ===
In France citizenship education is known as ECJS (education civique, juridique et sociale) in the high school and "éducation civique" in the middle school and primary school.

As a response to the terror attacks in Paris on 7–9 January 2015, France announced a new plan to reintegrate citizenship into the French educational system. The plan seeks to restore authority to teachers, reinforce the values of the Republic, and promote community values and service. It includes training for teachers, a yearly charter to be signed by both student and guardian, community service assignments for student misbehavior, and a day of laïcité, or secularism, yearly on 9 December.

=== Poland ===
In Poland, citizenship is known as WoS ("Wiedza o Społeczeństwie", literally "Knowledge of Society") and studied as one of the matura subjects.

=== Finland ===
In Finland citizenship education is known as YH, YT or YO. (yhteiskuntaoppi)

=== Norway ===
In Norway citizenship education is the primary mandate of Social Studies.

=== Sweden ===
In Sweden citizenship education is mainly focused in the subject of Social Studies – Samhällskunskap, but also in Consumer Economics within the subject of Hem- och konsumentkunskap which is most closely related to Home Economics.

=== Indonesia ===
Citizenship education in Indonesia is nationally designed and implemented.

=== China ===
There is a curious kind of citizenship education in China which could be called "peopleship" education.

=== Honduras ===
In Honduras, to graduate from 6th grade, students are required to pass the "Anthem Test". This test aims to measure students' understanding of the country's history as well as the flag and coat of arms.

=== United States ===
In the United States, the course known as "Civics" teaches the fundamental aspects of the structure and operation of the United States government and the rights and obligations of U.S. citizens. Thirty-nine states and the District of Columbia require at least six months to one year of high-school Civics, while the remaining eleven states have no Civics requirement.

=== Vietnam ===
In Vietnam, Civic Education is a system of knowledge related to many fields such as philosophy, ethics, political economy, scientific socialism, law, guidelines and viewpoints of the Party and some important policies of the Vietnamese State.

== Criticism of citizenship education in schools ==
There are two kinds of criticism of citizenship education in schools. Firstly, some philosophers of education argue that most governments and mainstream policies stimulate and advocate questionable approaches of citizenship education. These approaches aim to develop specific dispositions in students, dispositions conducive to political participation and solidarity. But there are radically different views on the nature of good citizenship and education should involve and develop autonomy and open-mindedness. Therefore, it requires a more critical approach than is possible when political participation and solidarity are conceived of as goals of education.

Secondly, some educationalists argue that merely teaching children about the theory of citizenship is ineffective, unless schools themselves reflect democratic practices by giving children the opportunity to have a say in decision making. They suggest that schools are fundamentally undemocratic institutions, and that such a setting cannot instill in children the commitment and belief in democratic values that is necessary for citizenship education to have a proper impact. Some educationalists relate this criticism to John Dewey (but see critical comments on this interpretation of Dewey: Van der Ploeg, 2016).

== Notable academics ==
- Joel Westheimer, professor of citizenship education at the University of Ottawa

== See also ==
- Civics
- Global citizenship education
- Hansard Society § Citizenship Education
- Human rights education
- Spatial citizenship
- The Springfield Plan
