= J.P. Lewis =

- Born: Kitchener, Ontario, Canada
- Education: University of Waterloo (B.A., 2002); University of Guelph (M.A. in political science, 2003); University of Guelph (M.A. in history, 2004); Carleton University (PhD, 2011)
- Occupations: Political scientist, professor

J.P. Lewis is a Canadian political scientist and professor. He is an associate professor of political science at the University of New Brunswick's Saint John campus (UNBSJ) and serves as the chair of the Department of History and Politics. His research focuses on cabinet government in Canada at both provincial and federal levels, as well as citizenship education. Lewis is a frequent media commentator on Canadian and New Brunswick politics.

== Education and career ==
Lewis was born in Kitchener, Ontario, as an only child. He earned a Bachelor of Arts (Honours) from the University of Waterloo in 2002. He then completed two Master of Arts degrees at the University of Guelph: one in political science in 2003 and another in history in 2004. In 2011, he received his PhD in political science from Carleton University.

Lewis is a regular commentator on Canadian politics, particularly issues related to New Brunswick elections, government, and policy. He discusses topics including elections, cabinet shuffles, and voter turnout. He has also commented on federal politics, such as conservative party strategies.

== Selected publications ==
- Lewis, J. P. (2017). Lewis, J. P.; Everitt, Joanna (eds.). The Blueprint: Conservative Parties and their Impact on Canadian Politics. University of Toronto Press. ISBN 978-1-4875-1402-0.
- Wesley, Jared J.; Lewis, J. P. (2026). Big Worlds: Politics and Elections in the Canadian Provinces and Territories (Second ed.). University of Toronto Press. ISBN 9781487566791.
