= Guadalupe Haertling =

Guadalupe V. de Haertling (born February 1, 1871) was a Honduran composer and pedagogue.

Haertling was born in Tegucigalpa. Through her mother she was descended from José Santos Guardiola, a former president of Honduras. She studied in her native country, where her teachers included Laureano Campos. She served as an associated director of the Conservatorio Mariana Ugarte, and taught music at a variety of schools, both public and private, in her city of birth. Later she directed a school of piano in San Pedro Sula. She collaborated frequently with her husband, Carlos Hartling. Haertling composed a handful of piano works, including polkas and marches. The year of her death is unknown.
