= Augusto Coello =

Honduran writer of the national anthem (1884–1941)

Augusto Constantino Coello Estévez (1 September 1884 in Tegucigalpa – 8 September 1941 in San Salvador) was a Honduran writer, poet, professor and politician. He is the author of the lyrics of the National Anthem of Honduras.

== Biography ==
Coello became a deputy in the Honduras National Congress in 1904. He was director of various newspapers, El Imparcial, En Marcha and Pro-Patria in Honduras and La Prensa Libre, La República, El Diario, El Pabellón Rojo y Blanco in Costa Rica.

He wrote the lyrics for the National Anthem of Honduras in 1915 and wrote two books, El tratado de 1843 con los indios moscos (1923) and Canto a la bandera (1934). His son, also named Augusto Coello, was a writer too.

== Bibliography ==
- El tratado de 1843 con los indios moscos (1923)
- Canto a la bandera (1934)
