= Carlos Hartling =

German-Honduran composer of Honduras's national anthem (1869–1920)

"Himno Nacional de Honduras" - (Instrumental)
"Himno Nacional de Honduras"'s music was composed by Carlos Hartling

Carlos Hartling (2 September 1869 – 13 August 1920) was a German-born composer from Honduras, who composed the music for the national anthem of Honduras, adopted as the country's national anthem in 1915.

Born in Schlotheim, Schwarzburg-Rudolstadt, his parents were Georg Friedrich Hartlíng and Johanne Henriete Wilhemine Hartling. He studied in the Weimar and Leipzing Conservatory. In September 1896, he went to Tegucigalpa because he had a 27 June 1896 contract to be a music and band teacher. He sang for the first time on 23 September. In 1903, he received the honor of writing the music of a poem written by Augusto Cesar Coello Ramos. He was married to Guadalupe Ferrari Guardiola. Since the second administration of General Manuel Bonilla in February 1912, the lyrics and music were popularized and sung at all official ceremonies.

The Museo de la Republica in Tegucigalpa has his zither on display.
