= Flora and fauna of Honduras =

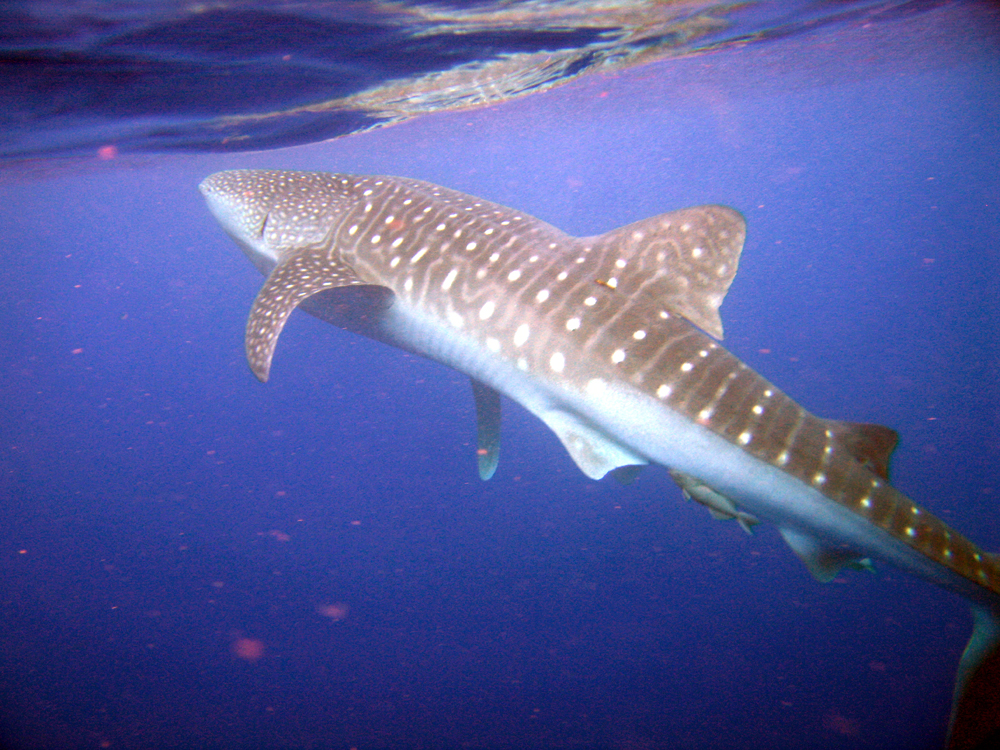
A whale shark near of the Island of Útila in Honduras

The flora and fauna of Honduras reflects the country's geographical location inside the tropics. This has allowed for diverse species of plants and animals to be adapted, but some of them are now in danger of extinction. This has posed the Honduran government, offices and nature organizations to look after the protection of the local environment, like the creation of nature reserves.

== Flora ==
The flora of Honduras is varied. Pluvioselva, classified a tropical rain forest, is one of its most impressive vegetal populations. Ecologists designated it "Hygrophilous Megatherm Type", for corresponding to regions of high humidity and constant high temperatures, with a single dominant species, like pines or firs, covering big areas.

The eastern part of the country, La Mosquitia, has many creeper and climbing plants, such as lianas. There is a great variety of epiphytes, most strikingly the orchids. Adapted to the humid environment, trees are enormous and do not possess deep roots, but are supported thanks to large buttress roots, while the leaves are large and many. The tree trunks are straight and smooth and their first branches are high above the forest floor. The rainforest corresponds to parts of the northern region below 600 meters in elevation where there is no fully defined dry season, and covers 29% of the total area of the country. Among the more typical plant species in this biogeographical region: Spanish cedar (Cedrela odorata), American mahogany (Swietenia mahagoni), St Mary's tree (Calophyllum brasiliense), guayacan (Tabebuia guayacan), wild cashew (Anacardium excelsum), guayabo (Terminalia amazonia) and many others.

Numerous palm trees exist near the coasts, as well as tropical fruit trees and multicolored flowering plants. It is very common to find textile plants like cotton or the pacaya palm (Chamaedorea tepejilote). Also there are many medicinal plants like chicory, Mexican-tea and tolu balsam. Used as producing trees of rubber (Ficus elastica) and resin, the white hawthorn, and the castor oil plant (Ricinus communis).

== Fauna ==
Honduras fauna is very rich and varied, the most common of those being arboreal, or living in flowing rivers and lake waters. Big animals are not very numerous but there are hundreds of species of reptiles, amphibians and birds; lizards and many varieties of fish in the rivers. Monkeys, bats and numerous birds abound in the trees. Since there is no cold season, thousands of species of insects swarm constantly: wasps, ants, mosquitoes, gnats and others.

Among the mammals, Baird's tapir (Tapirus bairdii), white-lipped peccary (Tayassu pecari), collared peccary (Dicotyles tajacu), jaguar (Pathera onca), cougar (Puma concolor), ocelot (Leopardus pardalis), margay (Leopardus wiedii), jaguarundi (Herpailurus yaguaroundi), spectral bat (Vampyrum spectrum), Wagner's bonneted bat (Eumops glaucinus), white-nosed coati (Nasua narica), raccoon (Procyon lotor), giant anteater (Myrmecophaga tridactyla) can be found.

Bird species are also varied and abundant. Some of them are: hummingbirds (more than 20 species); black-throated trogon (Trogon rufus), pale-billed woodpecker (Campephilus guatemalensis), spectacled owl (Pulsatrix perspicillata), mottled owl (Strix virgata), keel-billed toucan (Ramphastos sulfuratus), collared aracari (Pteroglossus torquatus), yellow-crowned amazon (Amazona ochrocephala), Finsch's parakeet (Aratinga finschi) and king vulture (Sarcoramphus papa).

Among the reptiles are the terciopelo (aka yellow-beard, Bothrops asper), rainforest hognosed pitviper (Porthidium nasutum), northern boa (Boa imperator), Middle American rattlesnake (Crotalus simus), green sea turtle (Chelonia mydas), spectacled caiman (Caiman crocodilus), American crocodile (Crocodylus acutus), coral snakes (Micrurus species) and the brown basilisk (Basiliscus vittatus). Other reptiles are the iguanas which mimic the varied tones of the forest and freshwater turtles. Among the abundant amphibians are toads and tree-climbing frogs of varied species.

The coasts of Honduras are bathed to the north and east by the Caribbean Sea and in the south by the Pacific Ocean at the Gulf of Fonseca. The turquoise waters of the Caribbean can be appreciated by means of diving on coral reefs with a big diversity of calcareous seaweeds, red seaweeds (Rhodophyta), and marine meadows, among other aquatic plants that form a natural ecosystem.

Among the fauna can be found along Honduran coasts, whale shark (Rhyncodon typus), dolphins, and a big variety of tropical fish, shrimps (Caridea) and many more can be found

=== Mammals ===
Among the mammals:

- Baird's tapir (Tapirus bairdii)
- White-lipped peccary (Tayassu pecari)
- Collared peccary (Dicotyles tajacu)
- Jaguar (Panthera onca)
- Cougar (Puma concolor)
- Ocelot (Leopardus pardalis)
- Margay (Leopardus wiedii)
- Jaguarundi (Herpailurus yagouaroundi)
- Spectral bat (Vampyrum spectrum)
- Wagner's bonneted bat (Eumops glaucinus)
- White-nosed coati (Nasua narica)
- Raccoon (Procyon lotor)
- Giant anteater (Myrmecophaga tridactyla)

=== Birds ===
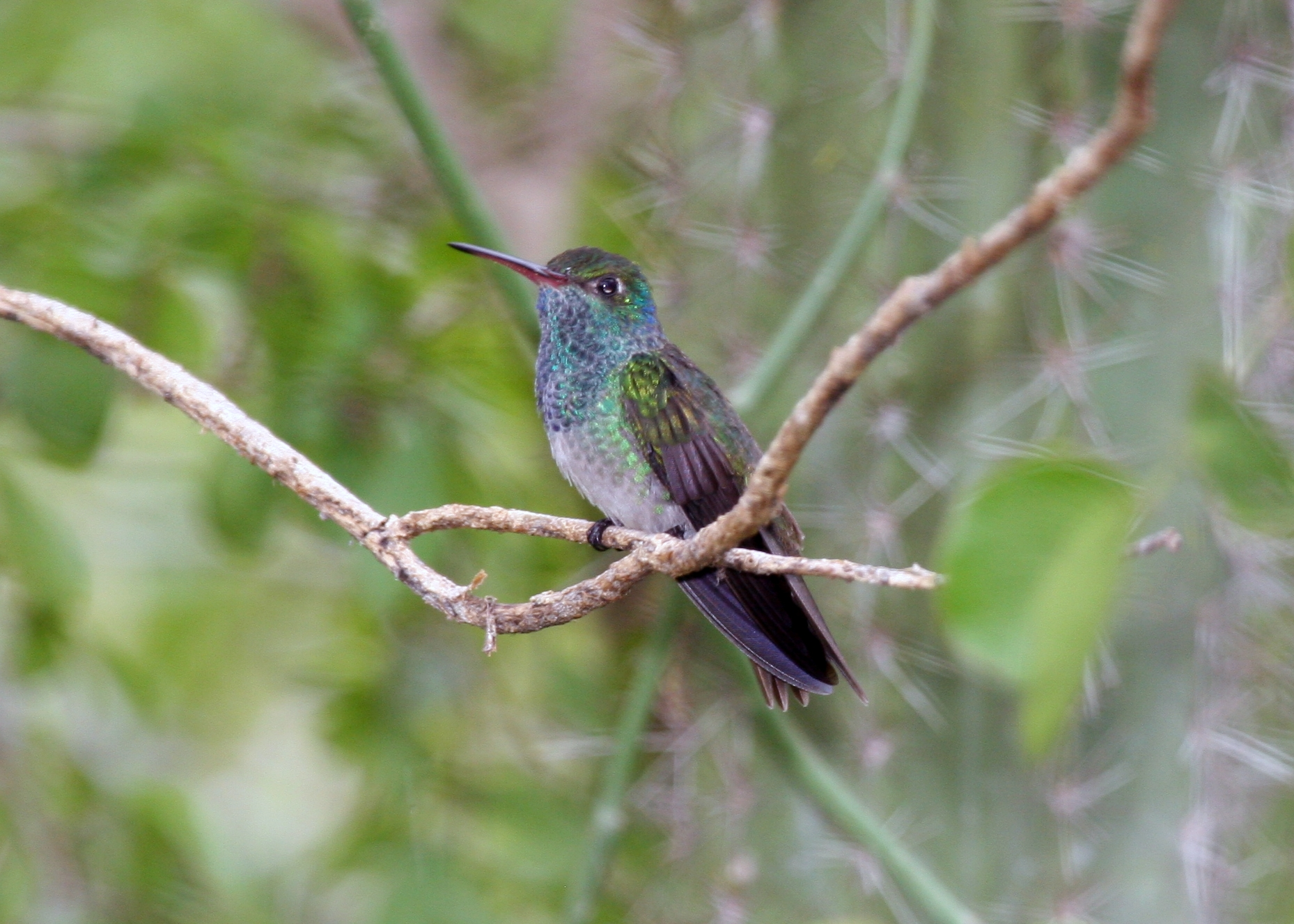
Honduran emerald (Amazilia luciae)

Birds are varied and very abundant, among which:

- More than 20 species of hummingbirds including the Honduran emerald (Amazilia luciae), an endemic species.
- The black-throated trogon (Trogon rufus)
- The bird carpenter (Campephilus guatemalensis)
- The spectacled owl (Pulsatrix perspicillata)
- The mottled owl (Strix virgata)
- The keel-billed toucan (Ramphastos sulfuratus and collared aracari (Pteroglossus torquatus)
- The yellow-crowned amazon (Amazona ochrocephala)
- The Finsch's parakeet (Aratinga finschi)
- The king vulture (Sarcoramphus papa)

=== Reptiles ===
There are 264 species of reptiles known from Honduras, including 59 species that are endemic to the country. These include crocodilians (two species, the spectacled caiman Caiman crocodilus and the American crocodile Crocodylus acutus), lizards (103 species), snakes (142 species), and turtles (17 species).

The reptiles include the following:

- Terciopela (Central American lancehead), Bothrops asper
- Rainforest hognosed pitviper, Porthidium nasutum
- Northern boa, Boa imperator
- Middle American rattlesnake, Crotalus simus
- Brown basilisk, Basiliscus vittatus
- Green sea turtle, Chelonia mydas

=== Amphibians ===
There are 137 species of amphibians (frogs, toads, salamanders, and caecilians) known from Honduras, including 52 species that are endemic to the country. Anurans are the most species-rich group (97 species), followed by salamanders (38 species) and caecilians (2 species). While new species are still expected to be discovered, chytridiomycosis and deforestation are threats to the amphibian fauna. At least one species, the frog Craugastor chrysozetetes, is believed to be extinct.

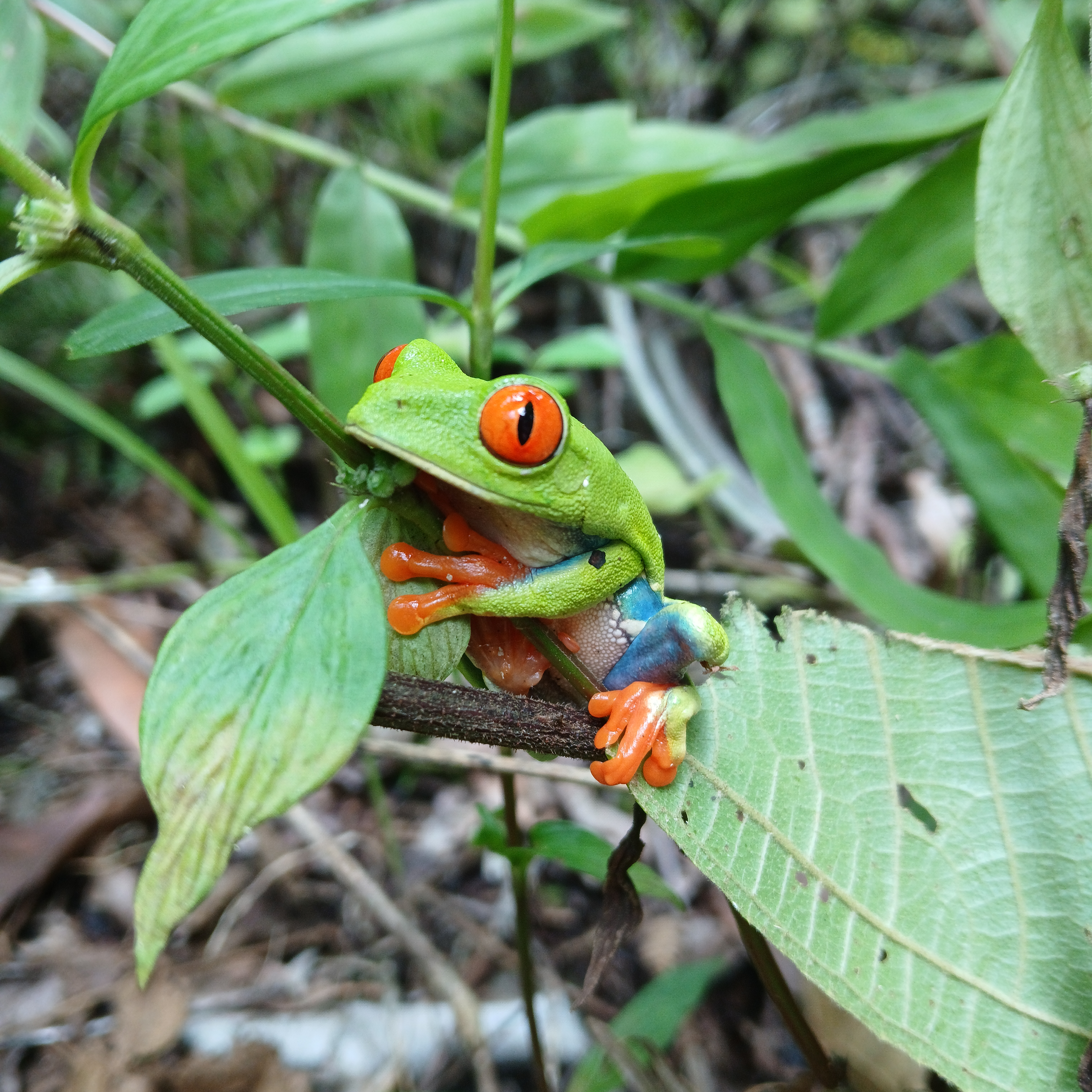
Red-eyed tree frog (Agalychnis callidryas) in a forest in eastern Honduras

=== Coral ===
The coasts of Honduras, to the north and east are on the Caribbean and in the south by the Gulf of Fonseca. In the turquoise waters of the Caribbean Sea can appreciate by means of diving the coral reefs with their diversity of calcareous seaweeds, red seaweeds, (Rhodophyta), like marine meadows, among other aquatic plants that tackle a natural ecosystem.

Among the fauna that can be found on the Honduran coasts, are the whale shark, dolphins, a variety of tropical fish, shrimp (Caridea) and many other species.

== Gallery ==
Biodiversity of Honduras

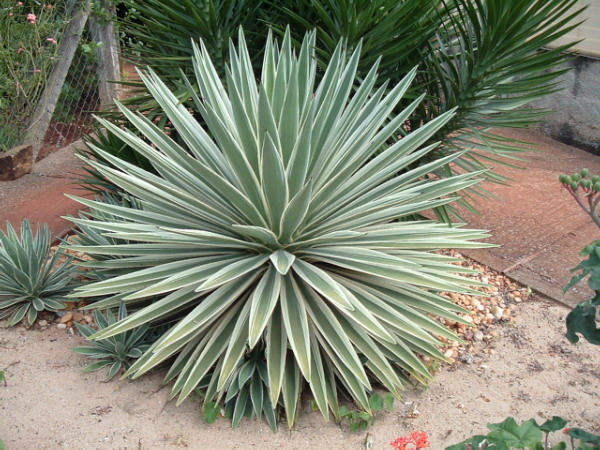
Agave

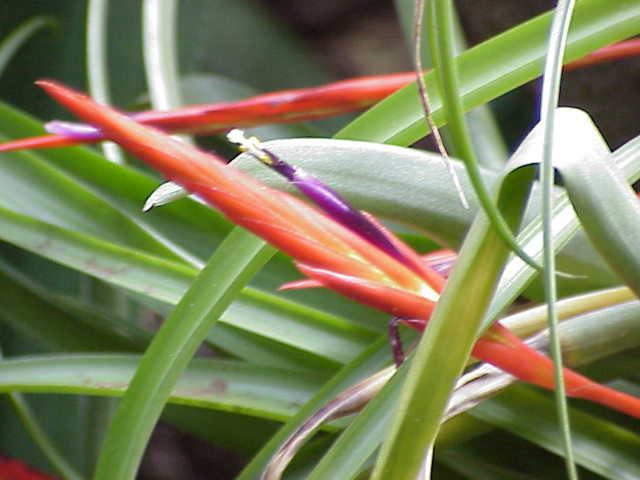
Tillandsia flabellata

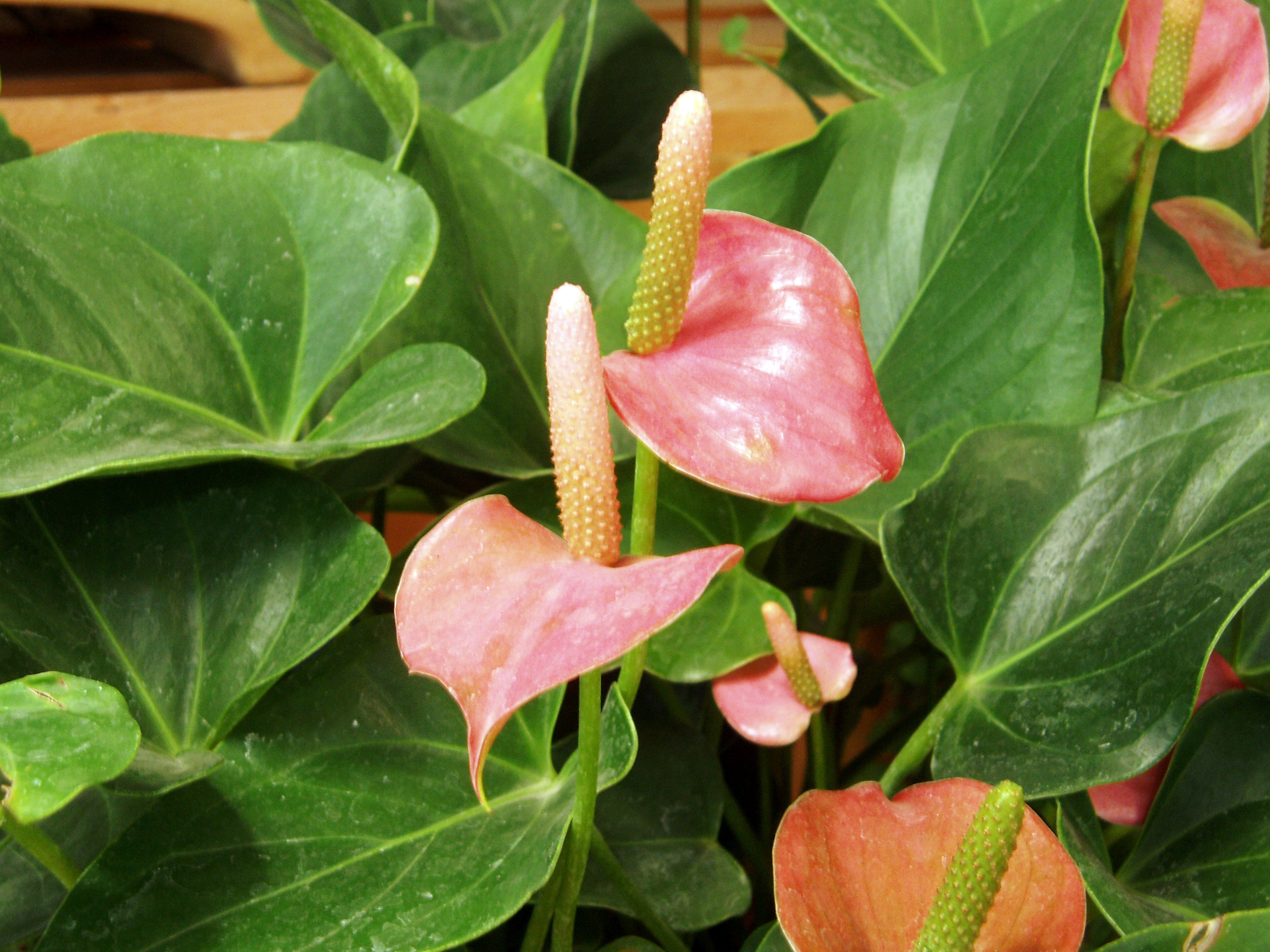
Anthurium

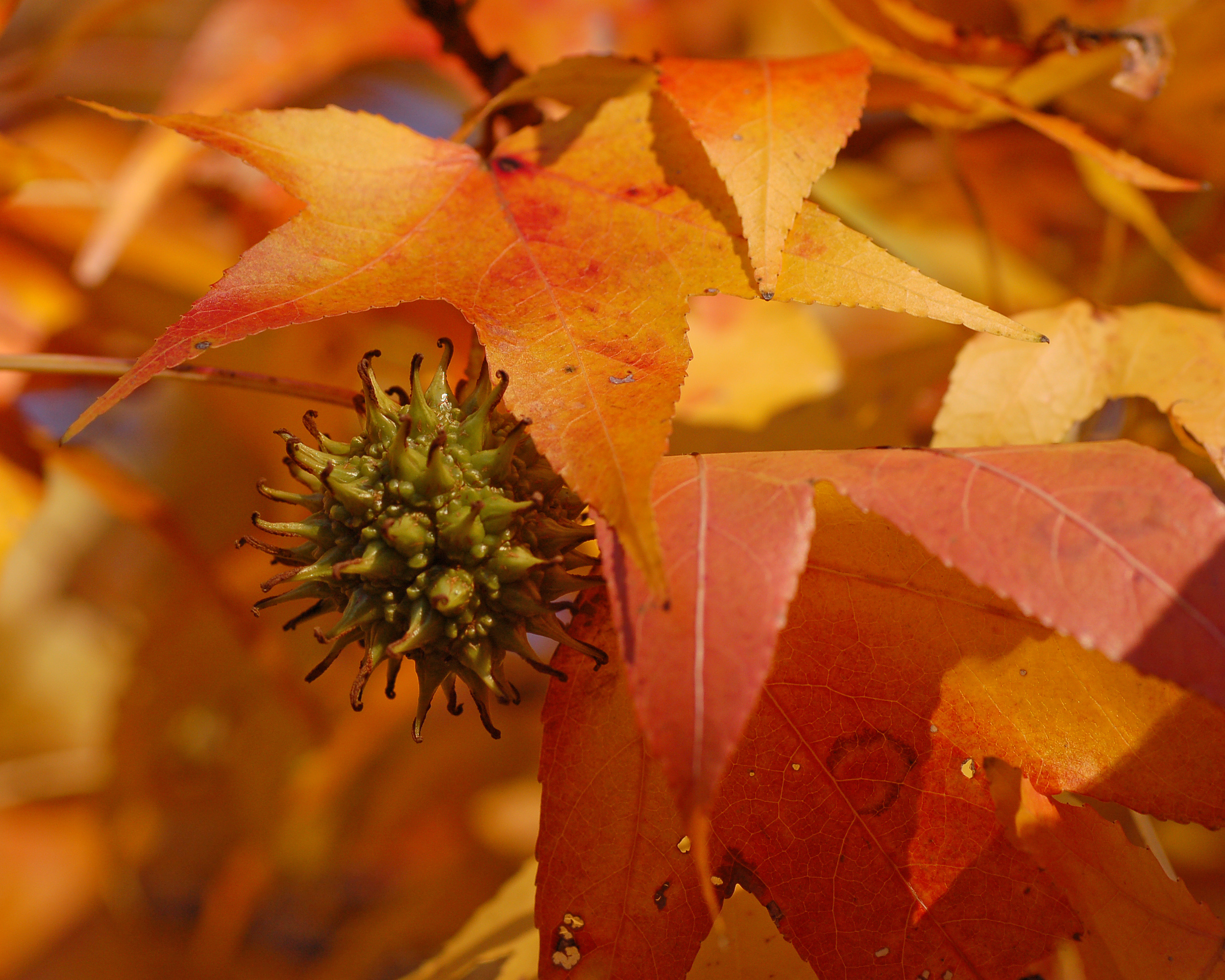
Liquidambar

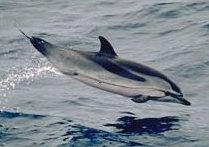
Dolphin

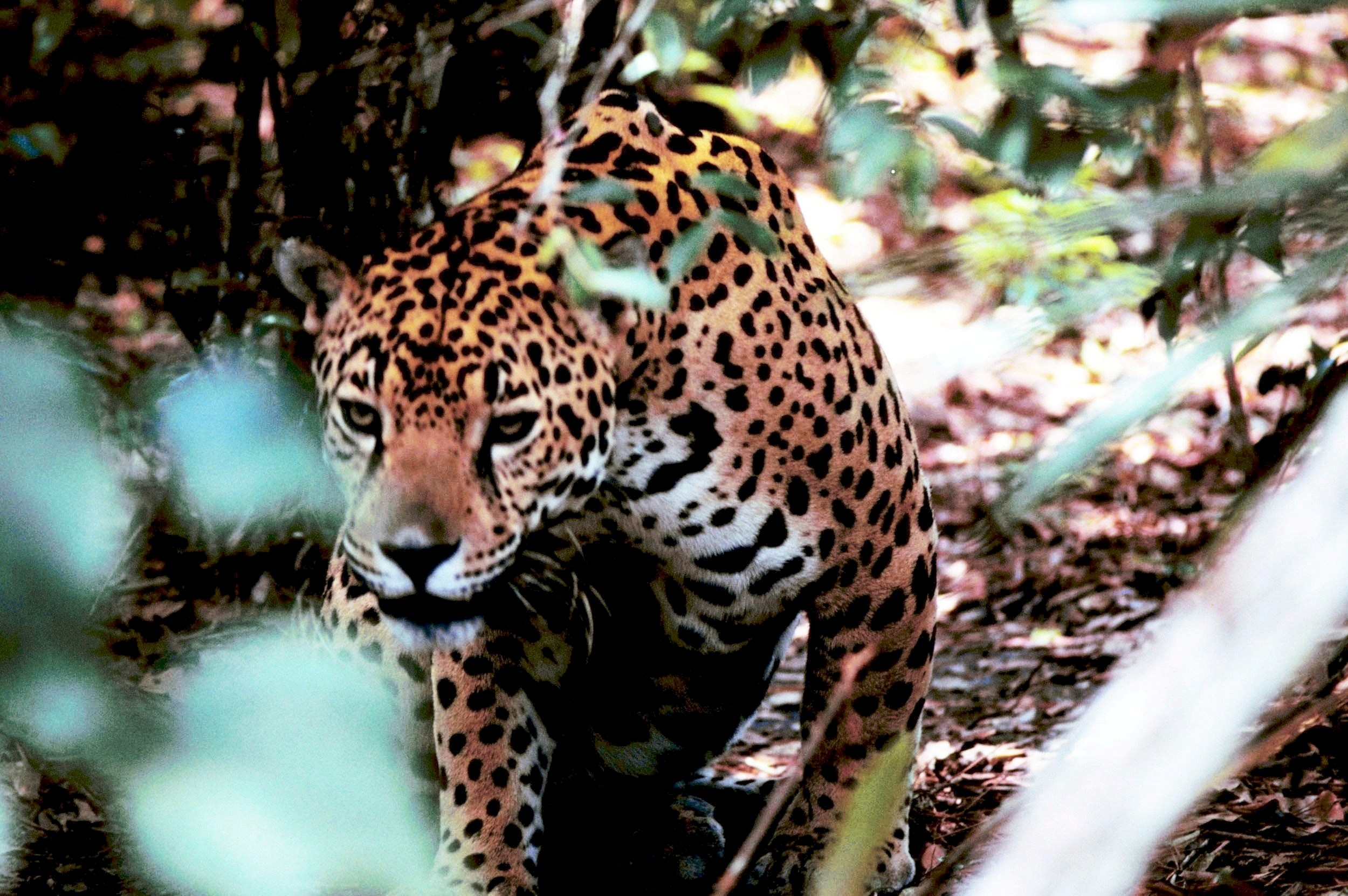
Jaguar

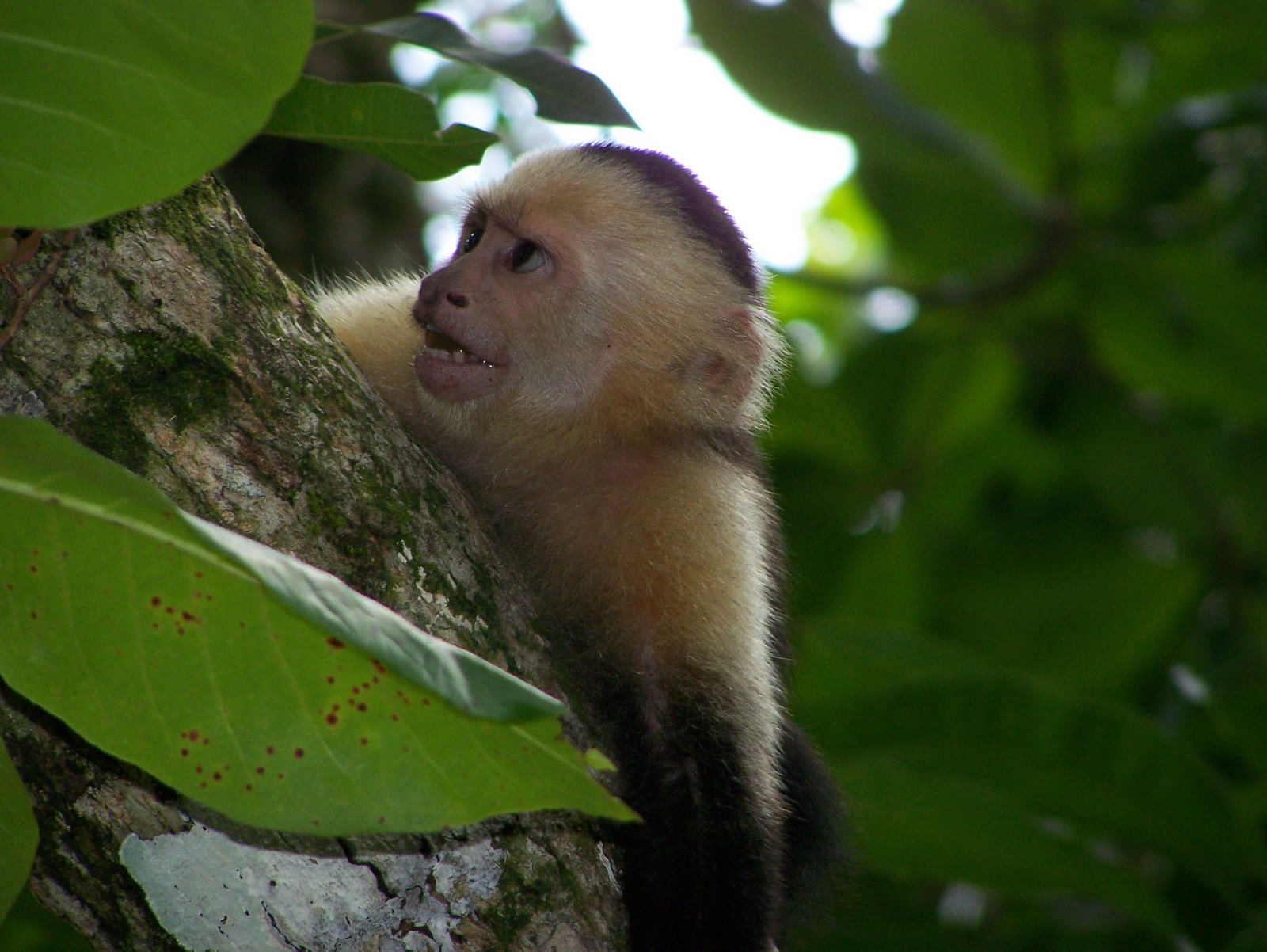
White-headed capuchin

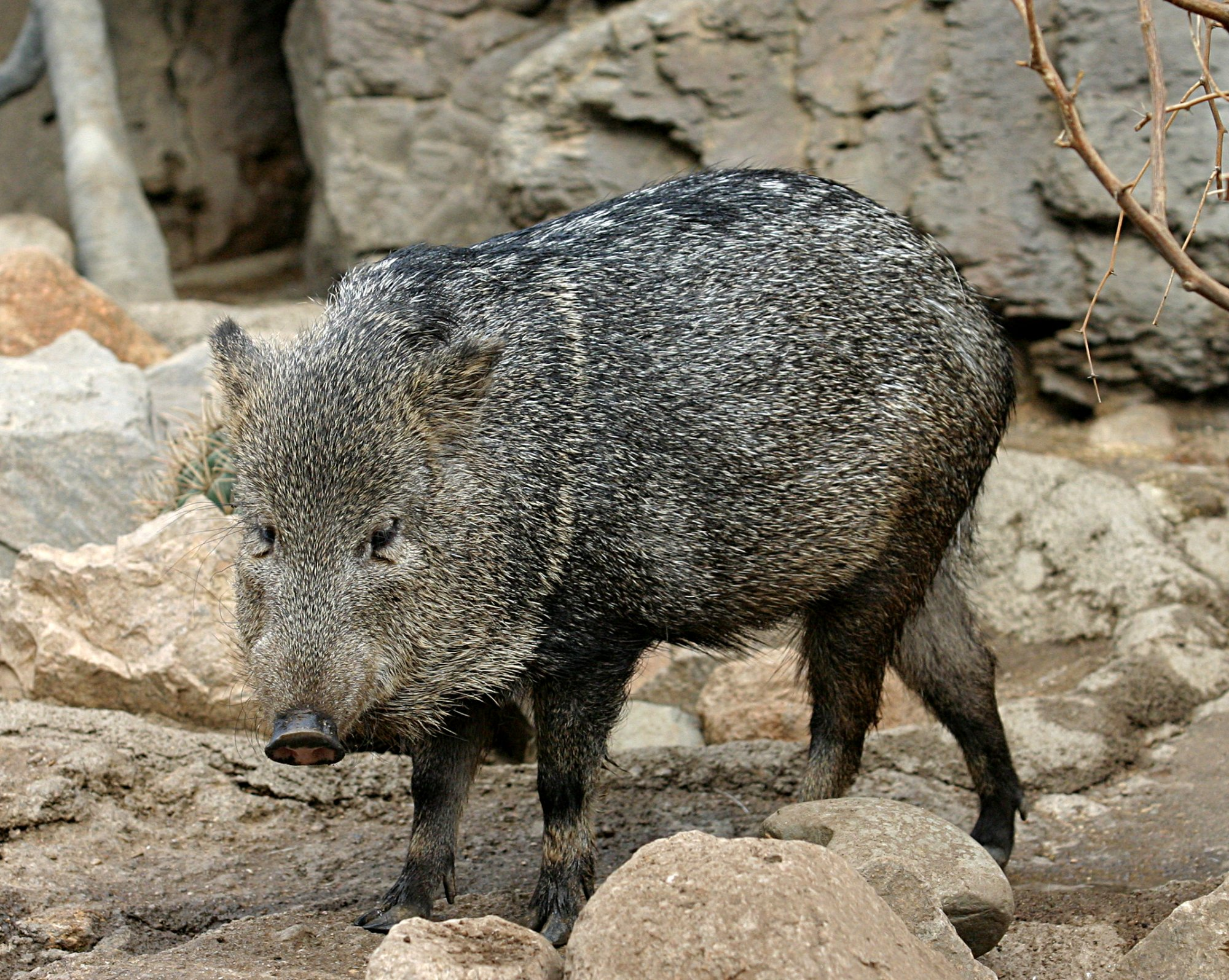
Collared peccary

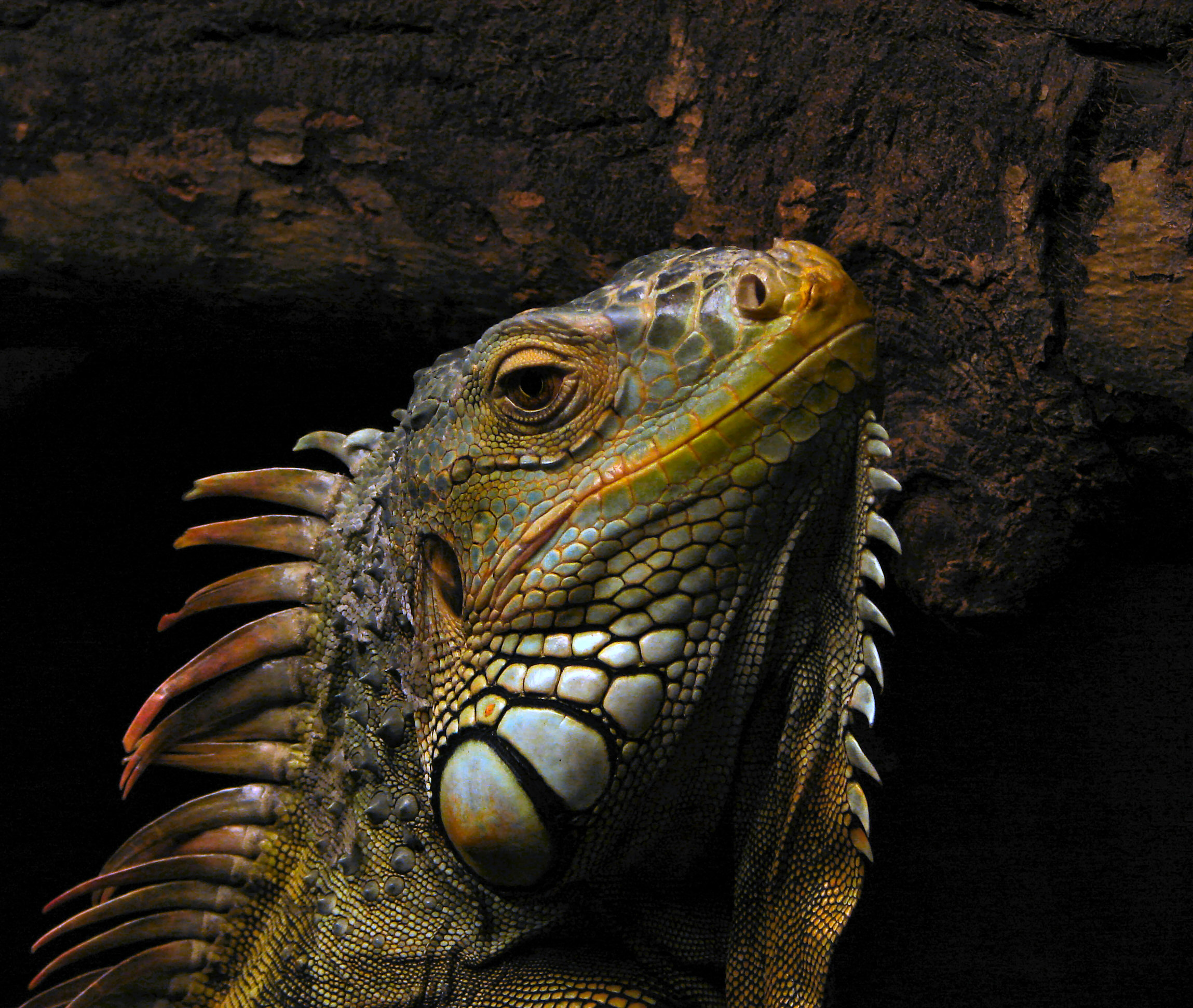
Iguana

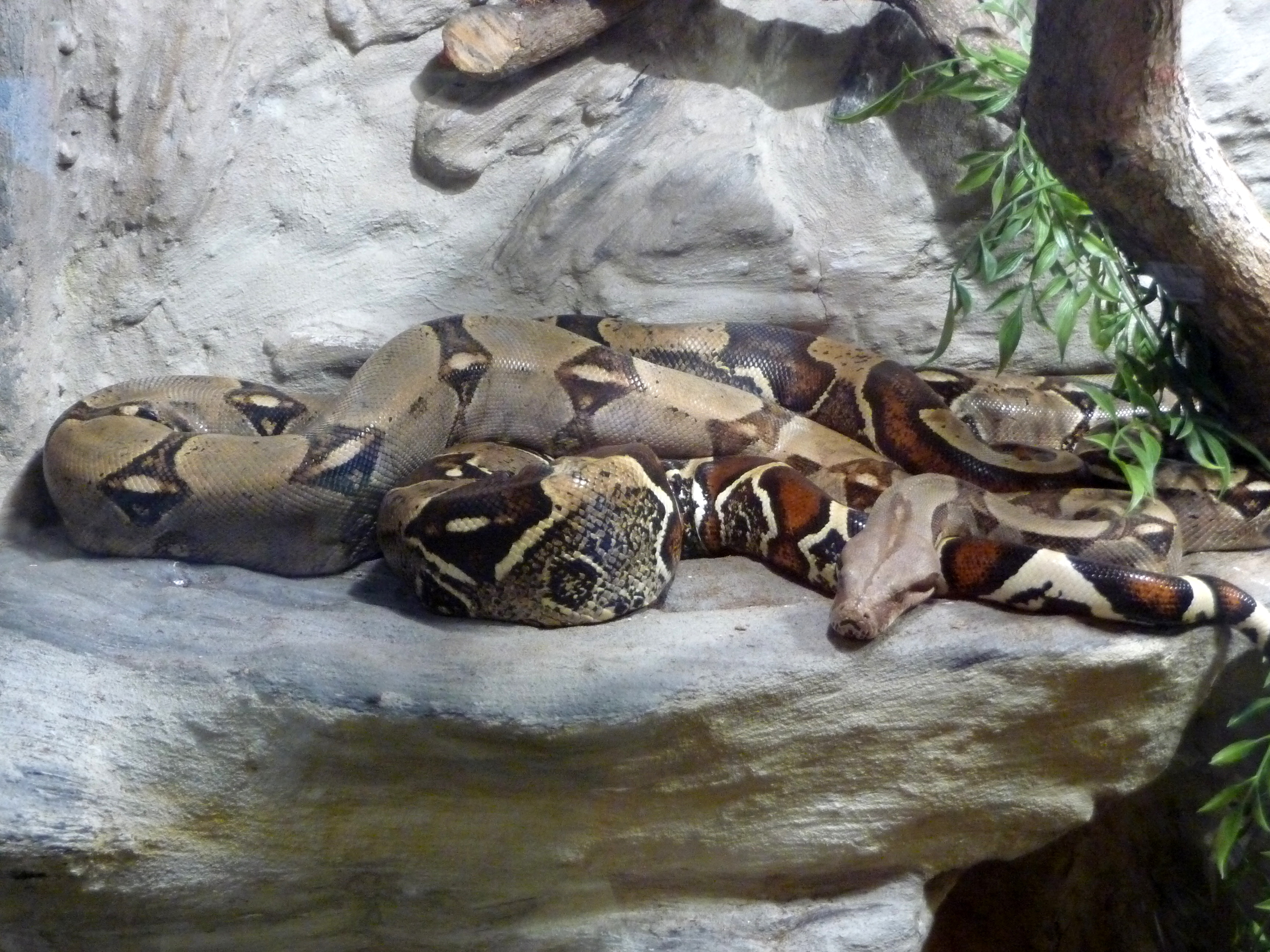
Boa constrictor

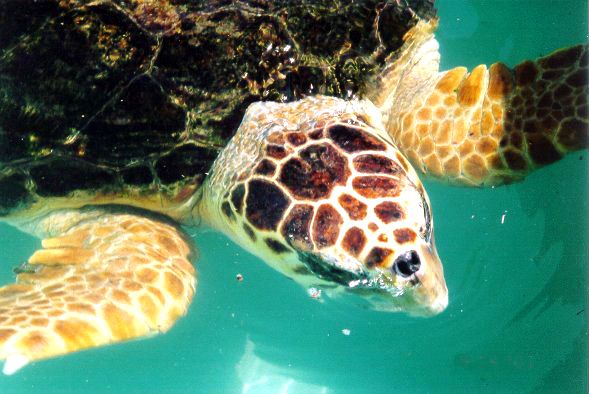
Loggerhead sea turtle

Cephalopholis fulva

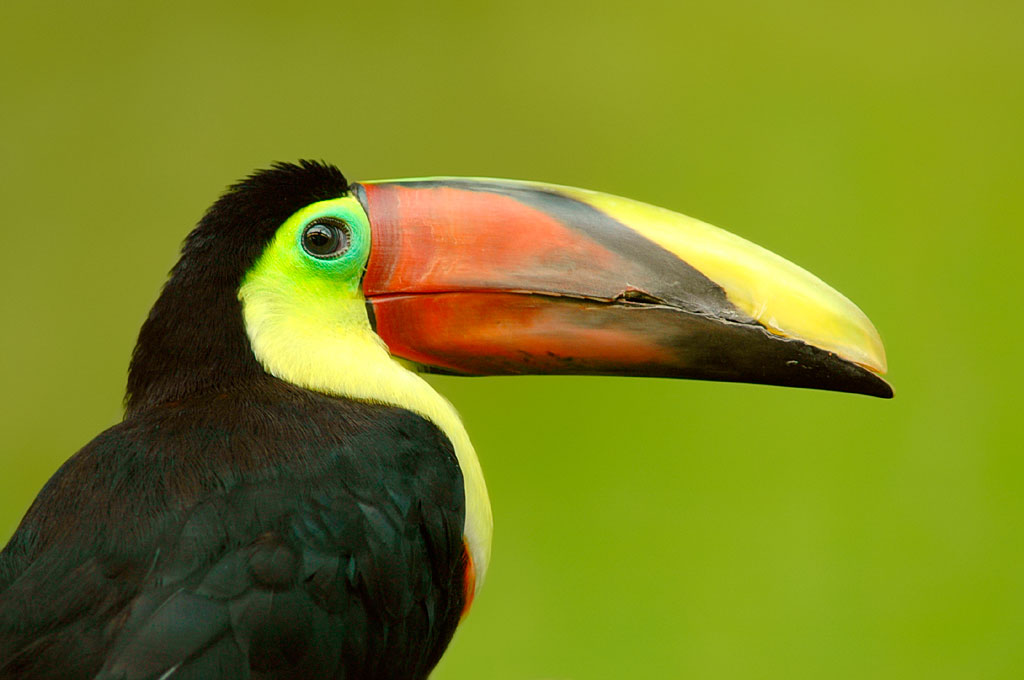
Toucan

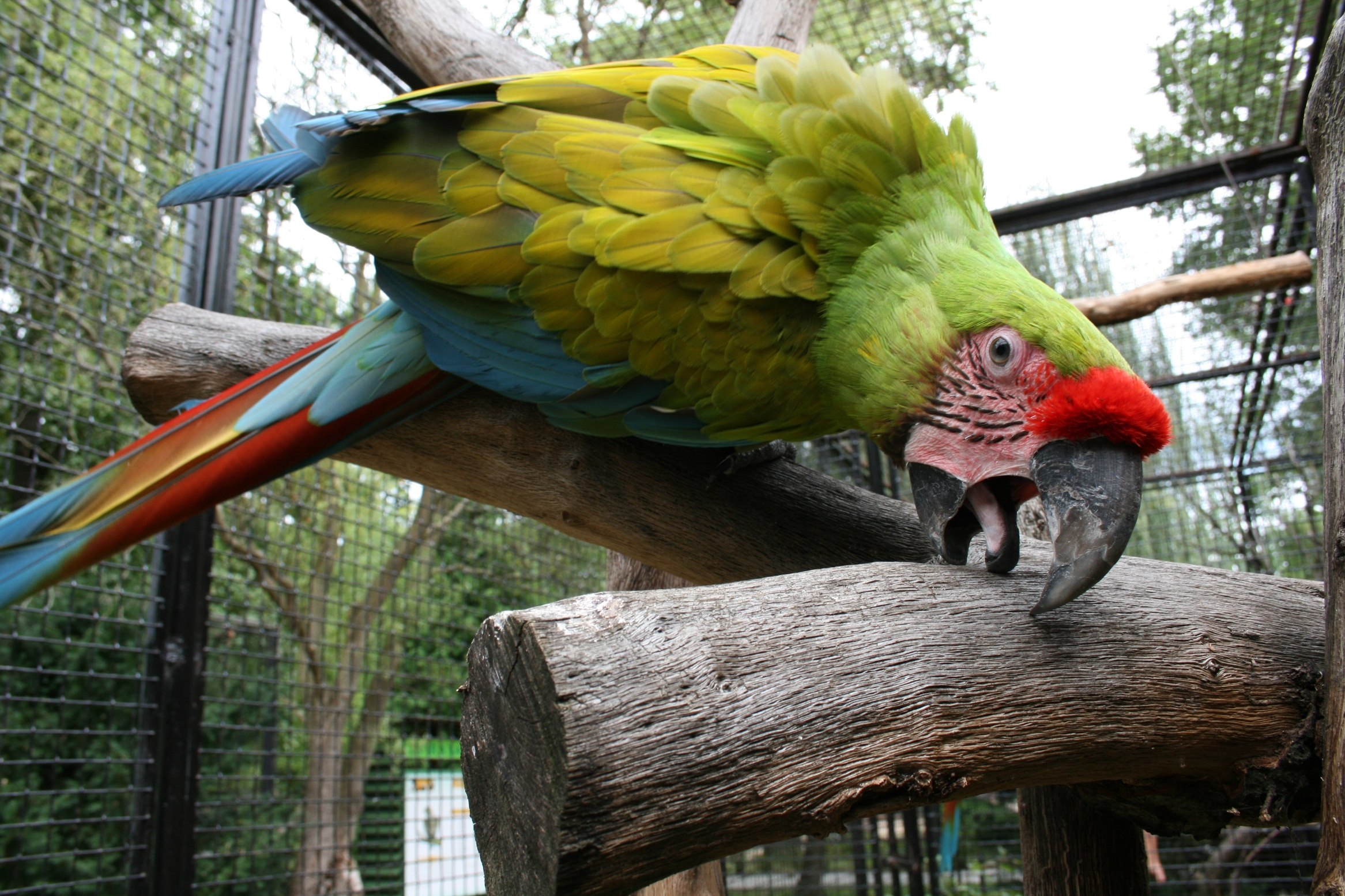
Great green macaw

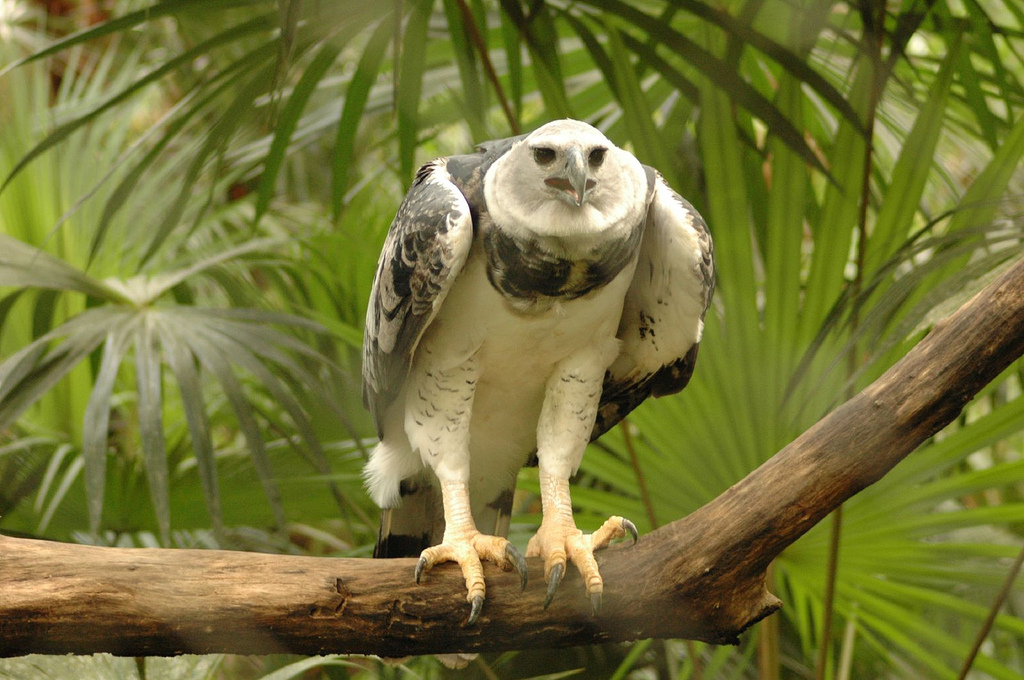
Harpy eagle

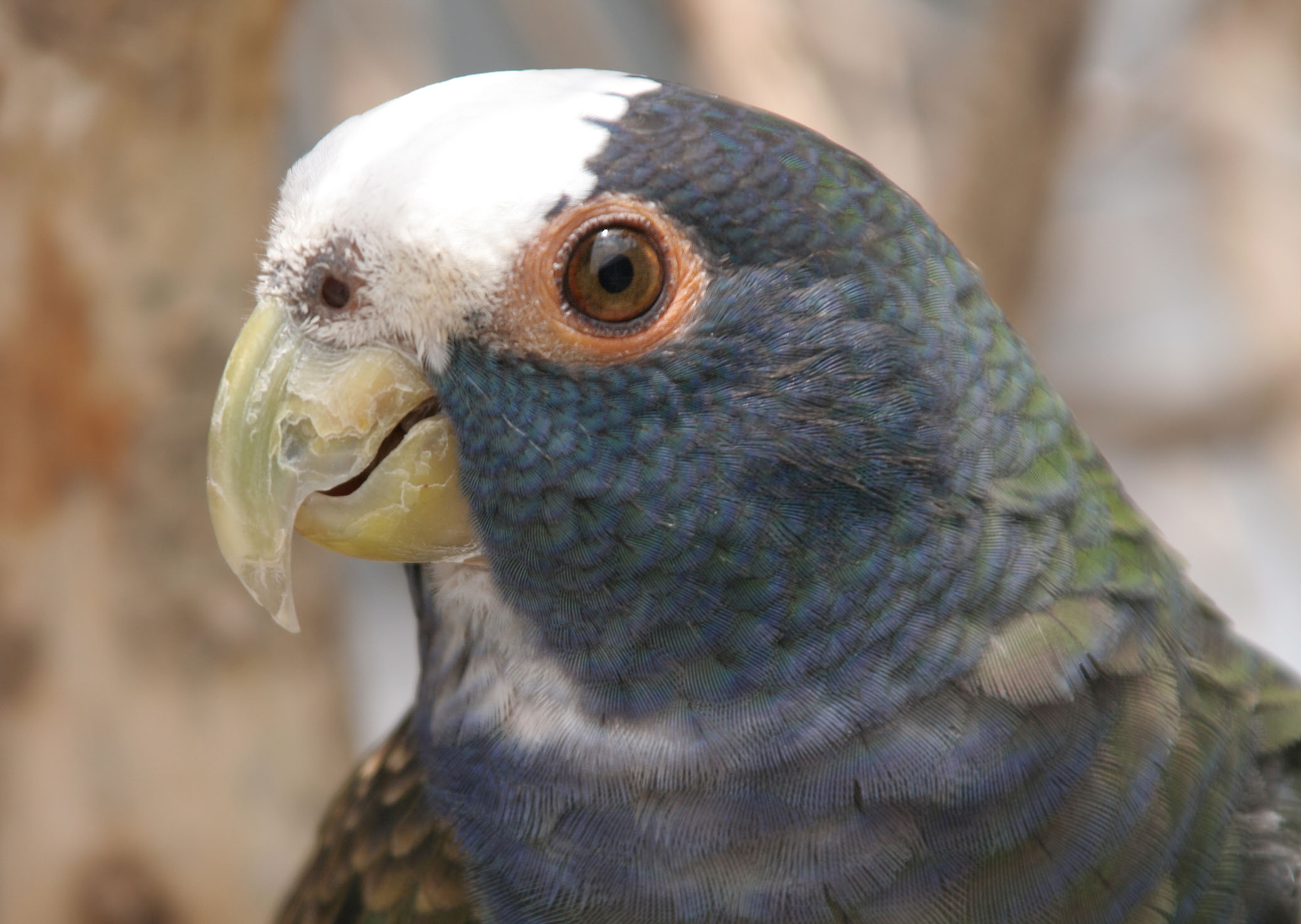
White-crowned parrot

== See also ==
- Category:National parks of Honduras
- Reservation of the Biosphere of River Banana
- National park The Tigra
- Botanic garden Lancetilla
- Ecology of Honduras
- Geography of Honduras
- Climate of Honduras
- Geography of Honduras
- List of national parks of Honduras
- Education in Honduras

== Bibliography ==
- Database biodiversity in Honduras Wild Honduras (consulted 2012).
