= International rankings of Honduras =

These are the international rankings of Honduras.

== International rankings ==
| Organization | Survey | Ranking |
|---|---|---|
| Institute for Economics and Peace | Global Peace Index | 112 out of 144 |
| United Nations Development Programme | Human Development Index | 112 out of 182 |
| Transparency International | Corruption Perceptions Index | 130 out of 180 |
| World Economic Forum | Global Competitiveness Report | 89 out of 133 |
| World Intellectual Property Organization | Global Innovation Index, 2026 | 116 out of 139 |
