= Geology of Honduras =

The geology of Honduras includes Paleozoic metamorphic rocks, such as the Cacaguapa Schist as its basement rocks. Together with Nicaragua and El Salvador it is underlain by the Chortis Block continental fragment. Currently, the Valle de Catacamas basin extends along the Guayape fault for 290 kilometers. Early tectonic research in 1977 suggested a possible origin for the underlying land in the Pacific Ocean rather than on the Caribbean Plate.

Through the Mesozoic, particularly the Cretaceous and into the Paleogene red beds deposited. Throughout the rest of the Paleogene, they became unconformably overlain by andesite lava, sedimentary rocks and rhyolite ignimbrite. In places such as the Plantares geothermal area in the Departamento de Copan, rainwater heats up in complex faults surrounding a graben formed in these rocks. In some cases faulting, like high-angle reverse faults associated with the Montana de Comayuga structural belt are related to the Laramide orogeny that built up the Rocky Mountains far to the north.

An extensive mapping project with keys in English was conducted by the University of Texas-Austin in the early 1970s.
