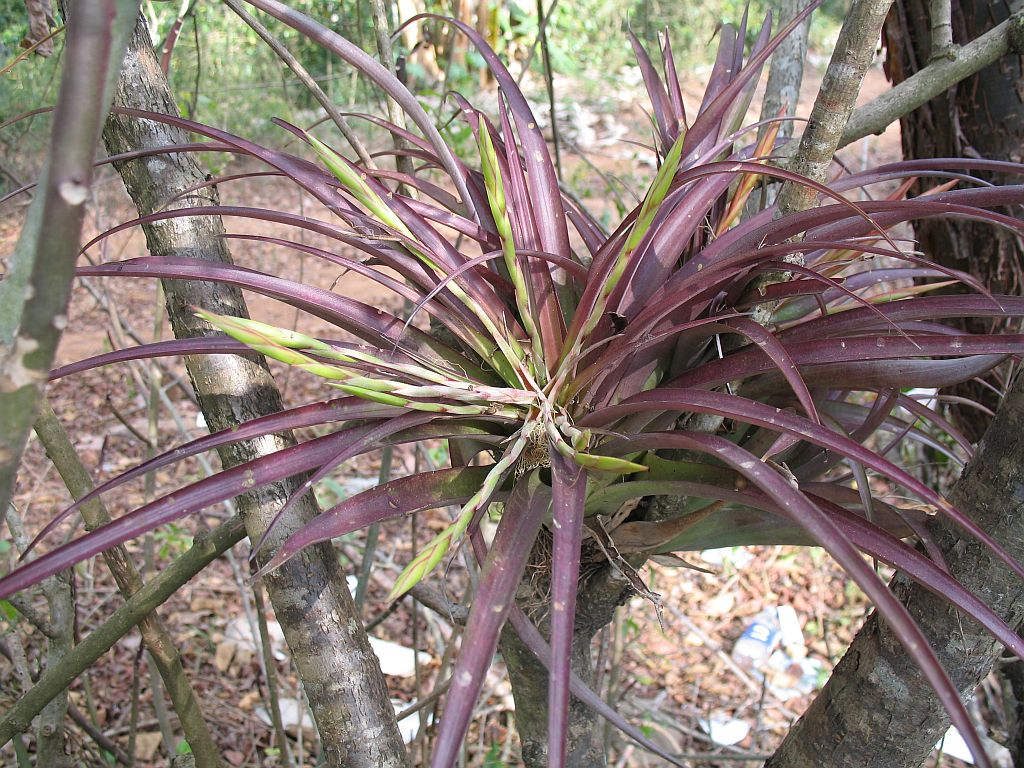

Scientific classification
- Kingdom: Plantae
- Clade: Tracheophytes
- Clade: Angiosperms
- Clade: Monocots
- Clade: Commelinids
- Order: Poales
- Family: Bromeliaceae
- Genus: Tillandsia
- Subgenus: Tillandsia subg. Tillandsia
- Species: T. flabellata

Binomial name
- Tillandsia flabellata Baker

= Tillandsia flabellata =

Species of plant

Tillandsia flabellata is a species of flowering plant in the family Bromeliaceae. This species is native to southern Mexico (Veracruz, Oaxaca, Chiapas) and Central America (Guatemala, El Salvador, Honduras, Nicaragua).

Two varieties are recognized:

1. Tillandsia flabellata var. flabellata – Oaxaca, Chiapas, Guatemala, El Salvador, Honduras, Nicaragua
2. Tillandsia flabellata var. viridifolia M.B.Foster – Veracruz

== Cultivars ==
- Tillandsia 'Bacchus'
- Tillandsia 'Brooyar'
- Tillandsia 'Cooloola'
- Tillandsia 'Graceful'
- Tillandsia 'Gympie'
- Tillandsia 'Inskip'
- Tillandsia 'Latas au Pair'
- Tillandsia 'Little Richard Olson'
- Tillandsia 'Oeseriana'
- Tillandsia 'Yabba'
