= Coat of arms of Honduras =

- Armiger: Republic of Honduras
- Adopted: 1825
- Motto: REPÚBLICA DE HONDURAS, LIBRE, SOBERANA E INDEPENDIENTE; 15 DE SEPTIEMBRE 1821 "REPUBLIC OF HONDURAS, FREE, SOVEREIGN, INDEPENDENT" "15 SEPTEMBER 1821"

The coat of arms of Honduras is a national emblem of the Republic of Honduras.

== Official description ==
Honduran law describes the coat of arms as follows:

The Arms to be used are an equilateral triangle. In its base there is a volcano between two castles, over them a rainbow, and below it, behind the volcano, raises a sun spreading light. The triangle is settled on a terrain bathed by both seas. Around it, an oval containing the golden letters: REPÚBLICA DE HONDURAS LIBRE, SOBERANA, INDEPENDIENTE. – 15 DE SEPTIEMBRE DE 1821. In the upper part of the oval appears a quiver filled with arrows from which hang cornucopias conjoined with a tie, and the whole lies upon a range of mountains, on which stand three oak trees on the right and three pines on the left, and, conveniently distributed, mines, a bar, a drill, a wedge, a sledgehammer and a hammer.

== See also ==
- Flag of Honduras
- National Anthem of Honduras
