= Flag of Honduras =

Republic of Honduras
- Use: National flag, civil and state ensign
- Proportion: 1:2
- Adopted: 1839; 187 years ago; (original design); 26 January 1949; 77 years ago; (current design); 27 January 2026; 9 months ago; (current usage)
- Design: A horizontal triband of blue (top and bottom) and white with five blue five-pointed stars arranged in an X pattern centered on the white band.
- Use: Naval ensign
- Proportion: 1:2
- Design: A horizontal triband of blue (top and bottom) and white with the national coat of arms above an inverted arc of five blue five-pointed stars centered on the white band.

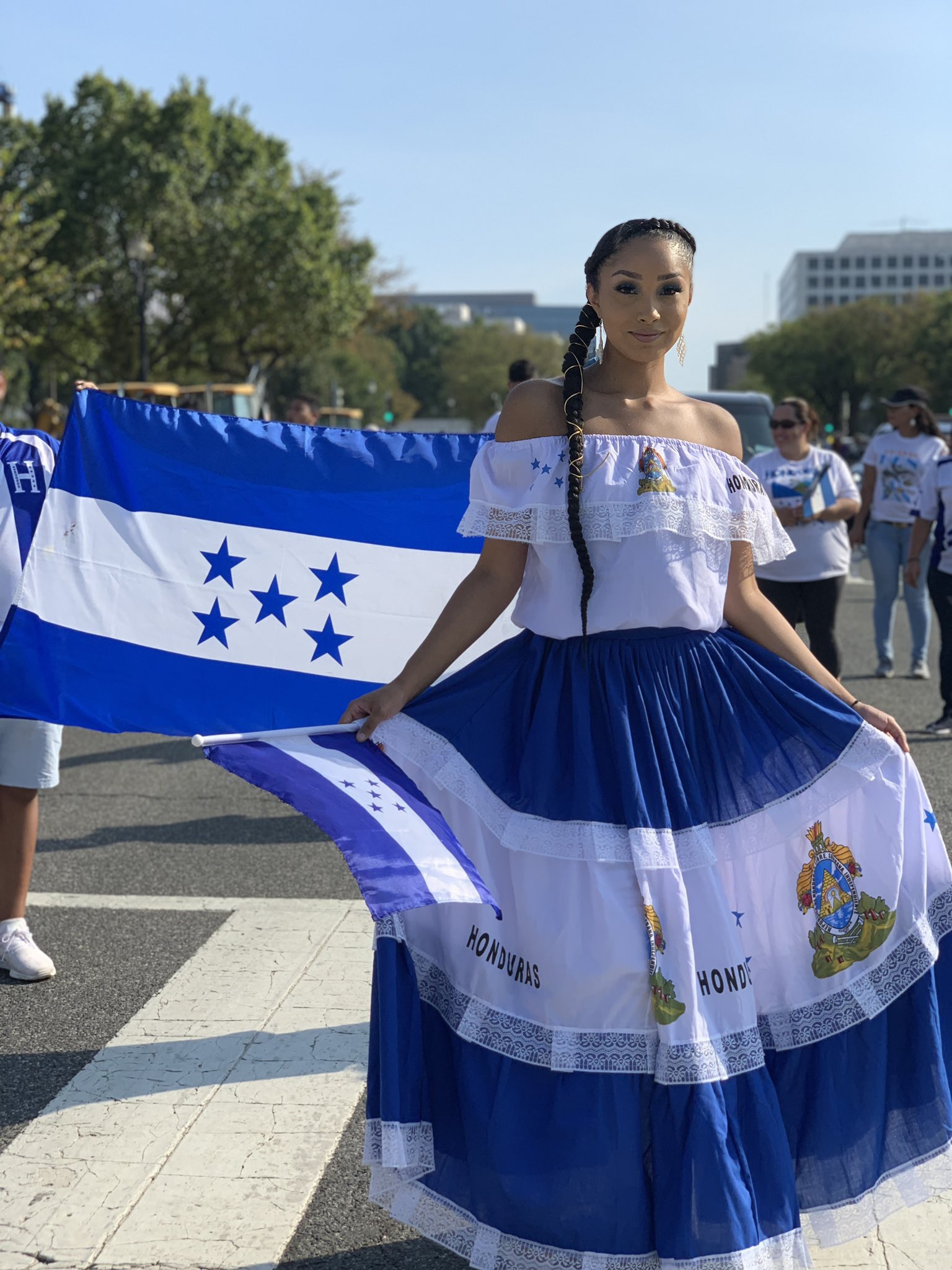
National flag and woman wearing the national colors at the Fiesta DC 2019 Parade.

The flag of Honduras consists of three equal horizontal stripes of navy blue, white and the same shade of blue, with five blue stars arranged in a quincuncial pattern at the centre of the middle stripe. The two outer bands represent the Pacific Ocean and the Caribbean Sea, and also represent the blue sky and brotherhood. The inner band represents the land between the ocean and the sea, the peace and prosperity of its people, and purity of thoughts. The five stars represent the five nations of the former Federal Republic of Central America and the hope that the nations may form a union again.

In 1823, Honduras joined the United Provinces of Central America and adopted its flag. It continued using a plain blue and white triband after the union dissolved in 1838. On 7 March 1866 five blue stars were placed on the flag to represent the five original provinces: El Salvador, Costa Rica, Nicaragua, Honduras, and Guatemala.

The phrase "five pale blue stars" belongs to the chorus of the National Anthem of Honduras, composed by Augusto C. Coello (lyrics) and Carlos Hartling (music). This line describes the five stars located on the central white stripe of the national flag, traditionally associated with a light blue or sky blue hue, despite historical variations in the official shade.

The flag of Honduras was created on 16 February 1866, under Legislative Decree No. 7, during the presidency of José María Medina. Its design was based on the flag of the former United Provinces of Central America. Later, Legislative Decree No. 29, issued on 18 January 1949, during the administration of Juan Manuel Gálvez, updated the regulations for the national flag. This decree officially established the turquoise blue color and defined the flag's three horizontal stripes of equal size, maintaining the ideal of Central American unity inherited from the former federation. The Honduran government only began flying turquoise flags after the inauguration of president Xiomara Castro on 27 January 2022, after the National Autonomous University of Honduras made that recommendation in 2021. On 27 January 2026, the flag returned officially to the previously used navy blue.

Ships of the Honduran Navy fly a naval ensign which has the coat of arms of Honduras above an inverted arch of five small stars and a pendant.

== Historical flags ==
=== United Provinces of Central America ===
Flag of the United Provinces of Central America 1823–1824

Flag of the United Provinces of Central America 1825–1839

The origins of the Honduran flag date back to United Provinces of Central America, which Honduras was part of. It was the first country in Central America to use a blue-white-blue triband, which in turn was based on the flag of Argentina.

=== First flag ===
1839–1866

Flag used since independence, and finally abolished in 1949. The flag has been defined as flag of the UPOCA without emblem.

=== Second flags ===
1866–1949

1866–1898

1866–1898 Alternative

On 16 February 1866, President José María Medina modified the coat of arms and flag, adding 5 stars representing the 5 original united provinces. The most popular arrangement of blue stars was similar to the arrangement of the dots on a die, but there were also alternative arrangements. Versions other than the current one disappeared by the 1930s.

Although there wasn't any mention regarding the exact shade of blue to be used, by the early 20th century, the most common version (including the one used by military forces) used navy blue.

==== Greater Republic of Central America ====
Flag of the Greater Republic of Central America 1896–1898

1898–1930s alternative

Between 1896 and 1898 Honduras was part of a union known as Greater Republic of Central America, while retaining its own flag, though some flagmakers began to render the five stars as gold, the same as the GRCA flag. This design was never declared official.

=== Third flags ===
1949–2022, 2026–present

On 26 January 1949, President Juan Manuel Gálvez amended the 1866 decree, confirming the position of the stars. The decree also defined the shade of blue used on the stripes and stars as turquoise. However, the flag continued to be produced using navy blue for 73 years.

Turquoise flag, 2022–2026

In 2020, the National Autonomous University of Honduras published its guidelines regarding the shades of blue used on the flag, due to the "absence" of an official position about the topic. Following the intention of the 1949 decree, the guidelines established a lighter shade of blue for the Honduran flag "until its colors are defined and regulated by legislative decree". UNAH institutionalized the use of the color blue with hexadecimal code #00BCE4 to represent the flag.

On 4 January 2022, the Honduran Armed Forces announced a change from this month on their monograms, uniforms and logo to represent the national flag in turquoise. The announcement came shortly after President Xiomara Castro also announced the use of the flag in that shade of blue. Honduras officially adopted turquoise blue in the National Flag, returning to the color established in Legislative Decree No. 7 of 1866 and the 1949 reform. This change sought a "historical vindication" against the navy blue used by previous administrations. In January of 2026, the National Party officially fulfilled a campaign promise to return the flag to its previous navy blue colour.

== Flags of subdivisions ==
=== Departments ===
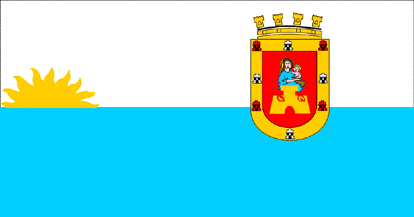
Colón

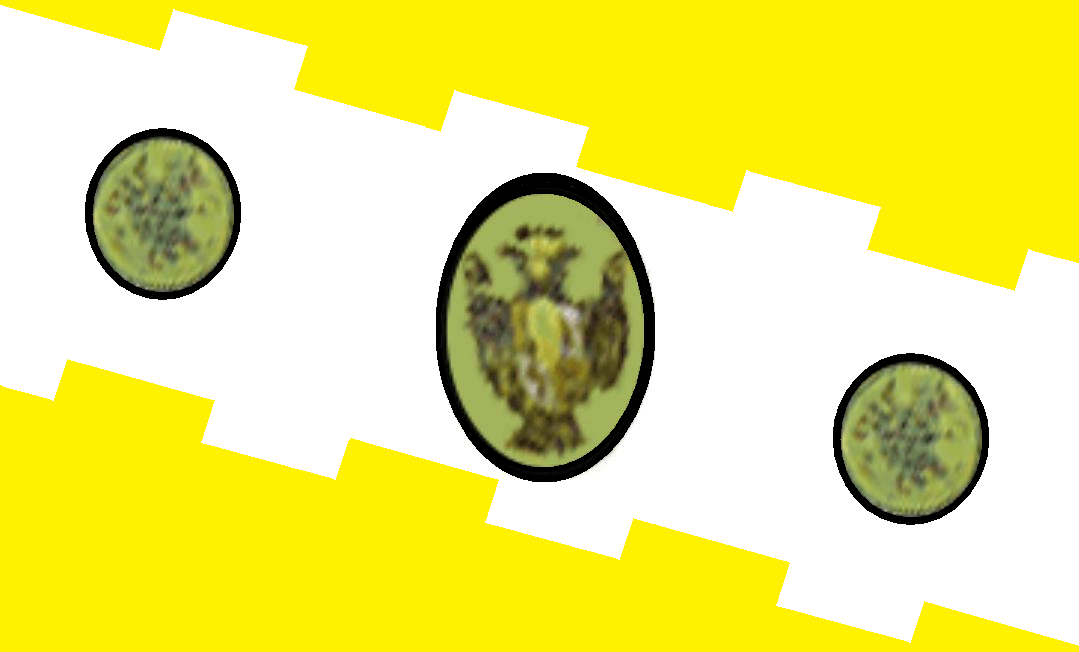
Comayagua

Copán

Francisco Morazán

Ocotepeque

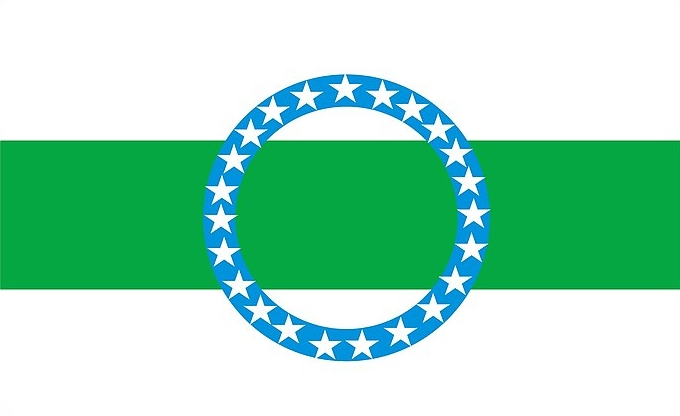
Olancho

Santa Bárbara

== Ethnic group flags ==
Flag	Use
	Flag of the Garifuna
	Flag of the Lenca people

== See also ==
- Coat of arms of Honduras
- National Anthem of Honduras
- Flag of Argentina (similar, except for the central symbolism)
- Flag of El Salvador
- Flag of Nicaragua
