= National Anthem of Honduras =

"Tu bandera es un lampo de cielo", adopted in 1915

Himno Nacional de Honduras
English: National Anthem of Honduras
- National anthem of Honduras
- Also known as: Tu bandera es un lampo de cielo (English: Your flag is a splendour of sky)
- Lyrics: Augusto C. Coello
- Music: Carlos Hartling
- Adopted: 1915

Audio sample
- U.S. Navy Band instrumental version: file; help

The "National Anthem of Honduras" (Spanish: Himno Nacional de Honduras) was adopted by presidential decree 42 in 1915. The lyrics were written by Augusto C. Coello and the music composed by Carlos Hartling.

Unofficially, the anthem is sometimes called "Tu bandera es un lampo de cielo" ("Your flag is a splendour of sky"), which is the first line of the chorus, as a type of incipit.

== History ==
Between independence from Spain in 1821 and 1915, Honduras did not have an official national anthem and used various unofficial anthems such as "La Granadera" (by Rómulo E. Durón), "El Himno Marcial", "Un Salva Hondureño" (of unknown authorship), "Himno Nacional" (by Valentín Durón), "Marcha a Gerardo Barrios" (by Belgian author Coussin, used during the presidency of José María Medina) and the "Himno Hondureño".

In 1904, a group of intellectuals proposed to President Manuel Bonilla a competition to find a national anthem, but a competition was not held until 1910 with Decree No. 115, during the presidency of Miguel Rafael Dávila Cuéllar, at the initiative of deputies Rómulo E. Durón and Ramón Valladares. This competition was declared void in 1912, because the ten works presented did not meet the requirements.

Later, a competition was held in which those who competed included Valentín Durón, Santos B. Tercero, Jerónimo Reyna, Juan Ramón Molina and Alfonso Guillén Zelaya. The works were published in the Revista del Archivo y Biblioteca Nacional. The competition was won by a poem titled "Canto a Honduras" or "Canto a mi patria", by writer Augusto C. Coello. German-born composer Carlos Hartling was commissioned to compose the music for the anthem, which he did in 1903, although he had previously written scores for the anthem while lyrics were not available.

The anthem was made official on 13 November 1915 with Decree No. 42 by President Alberto de Jesús Membreño, which was published in Gazette No. 4 529 of 15 January 1916 and approved by decree number 34 of 23 January 1917. It was first performed at the Guadalupe Reyes School in Tegucigalpa on 15 September 1915, and performances in official functions began in 1917, the first of which was a performance at the Escuela Normal de Señoritas in Comayagüela. An official explanation of the anthem by Gualberto Cantarero Palacios was later published by the Ministry of Public Education.

== Lyrics ==
In its entirety, the anthem is a brief chronology of Honduran history. The anthem consists of the chorus and seven verses. For official functions and school exercises, only the chorus and seventh verse are sung, which was ordered in the late 1920s by minister Presentacion Centeno during the presidency of Miguel Paz Barahona. During sport events where brevity is essential, a shorter, abridged version is performed which usually consists of only one repeat of the chorus and a section of the verse.

The chorus, which is sung before and after the seventh verse, is a description of Honduras's chief national symbols, the flag and the coat of arms. The seventh verse is a patriotic call to duty to Hondurans to defend the flag and the nation.

By the time Hondurans complete their sixth year of elementary education, they will have memorised and been taught the meaning of the chorus and all seven stanzas. For graduations in middle school, high school, university or another type of graduation, an exam will be done based on a questionnaire of the National Anthem.

=== Short version ===
Spanish original

Coro:
Tu bandera, tu bandera es un lampo de cielo
Por un bloque, por un bloque de nieve cruzado;
Y se ven en su fondo sagrado
Cinco estrellas de pálido azul;
En tu emblema, que un mar rumoroso
Con sus ondas bravías escuda,
De un volcán, de un volcán tras la cima desnuda
Hay un astro, hay un astro de nítida luz.

VII
Por guardar ese emblema divino,
Marcharemos Oh! Patria a la muerte,
Generosa será nuestra suerte,
Si morimos pensando en tu amor.
Defendiendo tu santa bandera
Y en tus (Note: Sometimes written sus ("its").) pliegues gloriosos cubiertos,
Serán muchos, Honduras, tus muertos,
Pero todos caerán con honor.

Coro

English translation

Chorus:
Your flag, your flag is a splendour of sky
Crossed by a block, by a block of snow;
And seen on its sacred background
Are five stars of pale blue;
On your emblem, which a roaring sea
Shields with its rough waves,
Behind the bare summit of a volcano, of a volcano,
There is a star, there is a star of clear light.

VII
To keep that divine emblem,
Let us march, oh fatherland, to death,
Generous will be our fate,
If we die thinking of your love.
Defending your holy flag
And covered in your glorious folds,
There will be many, Honduras, of your dead,
But all will fall with honour.

Chorus

=== Full lyrics ===
Spanish original

Coro:
Tu bandera, tu bandera es un lampo de cielo
Por un bloque, por un bloque de nieve cruzado;
Y se ven en su fondo sagrado
Cinco estrellas de pálido azul;
En tu emblema, que un mar rumoroso
Con sus ondas bravías escuda,
De un volcán, de un volcán tras la cima desnuda
Hay un astro, hay un astro de nítida luz.

I
India virgen y hermosa dormías
De tus mares al canto sonoro,
Cuando echada en tus cuencas de oro
El audaz navegante te halló;
Y al mirar tu belleza extasiado
Al influjo ideal de tu encanto,
La orla azul de tu espléndido manto
Con su (Note: Occasionally written un ("a").) beso de amor consagró.

Coro

II
De un país donde el sol se levanta,
Mas allá del Atlante azulado,
Aquel hombre te había soñado
Y en tu busca a la mar se lanzó.
Cuando erguiste la pálida frente,
En la viva ansiedad de tu anhelo,
Bajo el dombo gentil de tu cielo
Ya flotaba un extraño pendón.

Coro

III
Era inutil que el indio, tu amado,
Se aprestara a la lucha con ira,
Porque envuelto en su sangre Lempira
En la noche profunda se hundió;
Y de la épica hazaña, en memoria,
La leyenda tan sólo ha guardado
De un sepulcro el lugar ignorado
Y el severo perfil de un peñón.

Coro

IV
Por tres siglos tus hijos oyeron
El mandato imperioso del amo;
Por tres siglos tu inútil reclamo
En la atmosfera azul se perdió;
Pero un día de gloria tu oído
Percibió, poderoso y distante,
Que allá lejos, por sobre el Atlante,
Indignado rugía un León.

Coro

V
Era Francia, la libre, la heroica,
Que en su sueño de siglos dormida
Despertaba iracunda a la vida
Al reclamo viril de Dantón:
Era Francia, que enviaba a la muerte
La cabeza del Rey consagrado,
Y que alzaba soberbia a su lado,
El altar de la diosa razón.

Coro

VI
Tú también, ¡oh mi patria!, te alzaste
De tu sueño servil y profundo;
Tú también enseñaste al mundo
Destrozado (Note: Sometimes written destrozando ("shattering [the infamous link]").) el infame eslabón.
Y en tu suelo bendito, tras la alta
Cabellera del monte salvaje,
Como un ave de negro plumaje,
La colonia fugaz se perdió.

Coro

VII
Por guardar ese emblema divino,
Marcharemos Oh! Patria a la muerte,
Generosa será nuestra suerte,
Si morimos pensando en tu amor.
Defendiendo tu santa bandera
Y en tus pliegues gloriosos cubiertos,
Serán muchos, Honduras, tus muertos,
Pero todos caerán con honor.

Coro

English translation

Chorus:
Your flag, your flag is a splendour of sky
Crossed by a block, by a block of snow;
And seen on its sacred background
Are five stars of pale blue;
On your emblem, which a roaring sea
Shields with its rough waves,
Behind the bare summit of a volcano, of a volcano,
There is a star, there is a star of clear light.

I
A virgin and beautiful Indian, you were sleeping
To the resonant song of your seas,
When thrown into your basins of gold
The bold navigator found you;
And looking at your beauty, ecstatic
At the ideal influence of your charm,
The blue hem of your splendid mantle
He consecrated with his kiss of love.

Chorus

II
From a country where the sun rises,
Beyond the blue Atlantean,
That man had dreamt of you
And in search of you launched himself into the sea.
When you raised your pale forehead,
In the lively anxiety of your longing,
Under the gentle dome of your sky
A foreign banner was already floating.

Chorus

III
It was useless that the Indian, your beloved,
Prepare to fight with ire,
Because, enveloped in his blood, Lempira
Sank into the deep night;
And of the epic feat, in memory,
The legend alone has kept
From a tomb the unknown place
And the harsh profile of a crag.

Chorus

IV
For three centuries your children listened
To the imperative mandate of the master;
For three centuries your useless complaint
Was lost in the blue atmosphere;
But one glorious day your ear
Perceived, powerful and distant,
That far away, over the Atlante,
A Lion roared indignantly.

Chorus

V
It was France, the free, the heroic,
That in her sleep of centuries asleep
Awoke angry to life
At the virile complaint of Danton:
It was France, that sent to death
The head of the consecrated King,
And that raised proud at his side,
The altar of the goddess reason.

Chorus

VI
You too, oh my fatherland!, arose
From your servile and deep sleep;
You also taught the world
The infamous shattered link.
And in your blessed soil, behind the tall
Hair of the wild jungle,
Like a bird of black plumage,
The fleeting colony was lost.

Chorus

VII
To keep that divine emblem,
Let us march, oh fatherland, to death,
Generous will be our fate,
If we die thinking of your love.
Defending your holy flag
And covered in your glorious folds,
There will be many, Honduras, of your dead,
But all will fall with honour.

Chorus

== See also ==
- Flag of Honduras
- Coat of arms of Honduras
