= American immigration to Honduras =

Estadounidenses en Honduras Americano-Hondureño
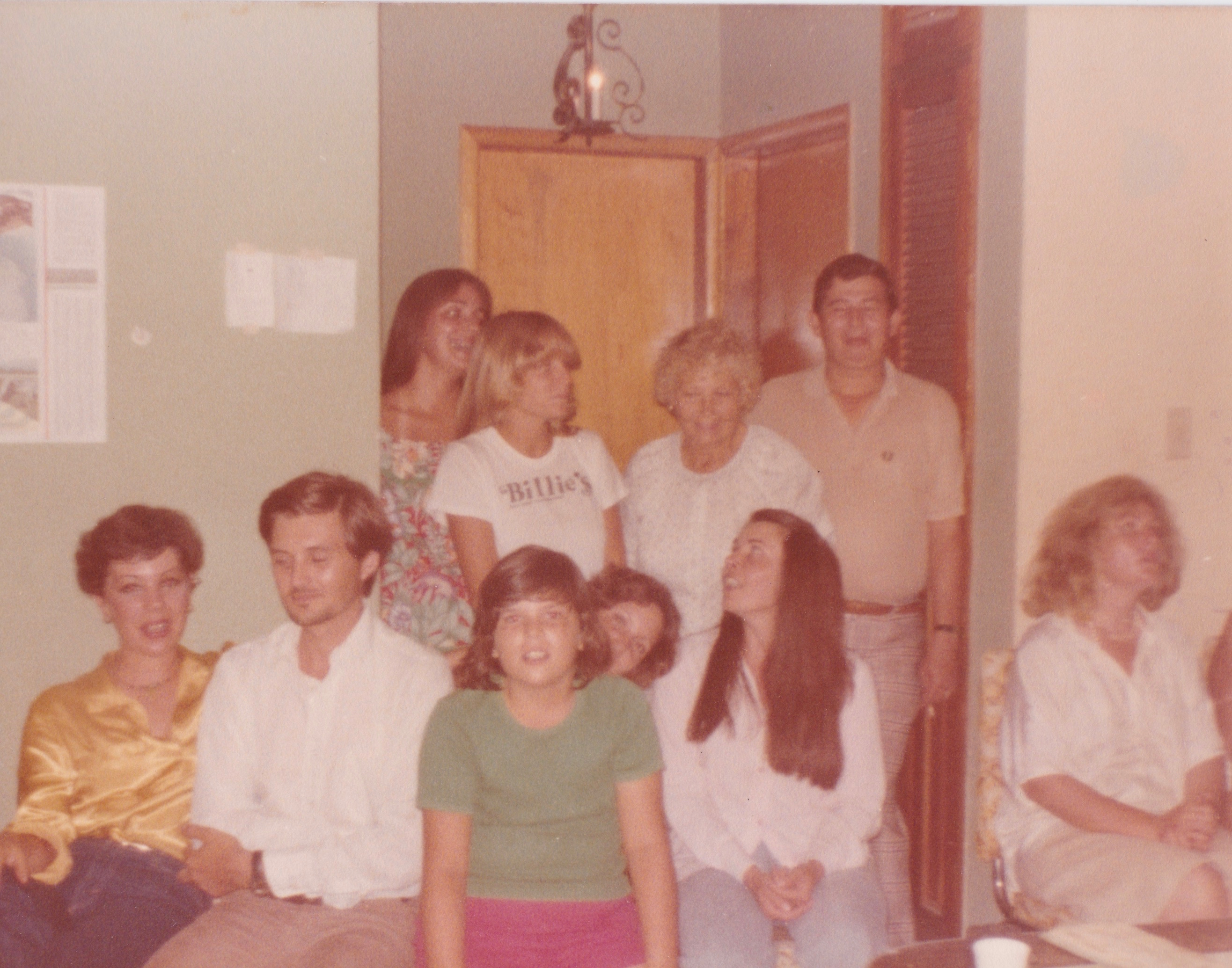

Total population
- 21,908

Languages
- American English; Honduran Spanish

Religion
- Christianity (Mayority Protestantism, minority Roman Catholicism)

Related ethnic groups
- Americans and American diaspora

United States citizens have emigrated to the Republic of Honduras (1821) for many reasons including agriculture, mining endeavours, business, military service and missionary work. In the last two centuries, the United States has developed many interests in Honduras. These have included banana farming and mining of gold and silver. Honduras also represents a route to the isthmus between North and South America and the Panama Canal. The United States has deployed armed forces to Honduras on numerous occasions to protect these interests. In geopolitical terms, Honduras has represented a bulwark against socialist forces in Central America and has a permanent United States military presence. Honduras has also received United States foreign aid. All of these factors have led to a gradual increase over many decades of American immigrants to Honduras.

== History ==
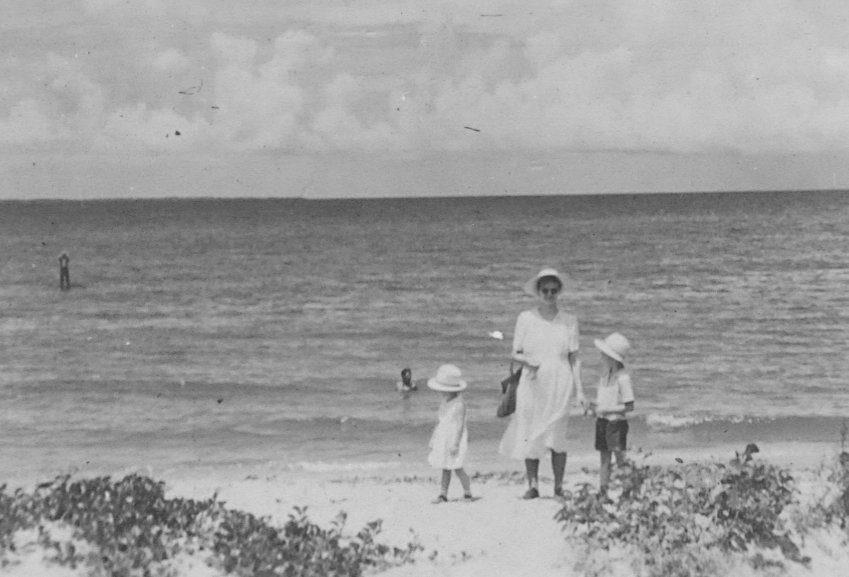
An american woman and her children in Trujillo, 1951.

The American Civil War (1861 – 1865) instigated a wave of migration to the northern and western areas of the United States, to Canada, Mexico, and the Caribbean. In smaller numbers, people also immigrated to Central America. José María Medina (1826–1878), President of The Republic of Honduras received the immigrants. In 1856, an American legation was opened in Tegucigalpa. In 1862, James R. Partridge (1823–1884), a Unionist, became the first U.S. government representative to reside in Honduras.

The first record of immigration from the U.S. to Honduras was made in the city of San Pedro Sula, on May 3, 1867. Sixty-one immigrants from the South, led by Colonel Malcom Green, made a formal request for immigration.

Marco Aurelio Soto (1846–1908) was President of Honduras from 1876 to 1883. Soto owned the mining rights to mineral deposits at El Rosario, San Juancito, Honduras. Soto offered companies that invested in his mine an exemption from Honduras taxes for a period of twenty years. In 1880, Julius Valentine, of New York City, founded the "New York and Honduras Rosario Mining Company". Valentine gave Soto fifty percent of the company's stock for mining rights at El Rosaria.

On April 1, 1895, President of Honduras, José Policarpo Bonilla Vasquez (1858–1899), issued another immigration law. He sought to regulate immigration to Honduras from the United States, Germany, England, France, Italy, China, and Palestinian (Arabia). A law of 1906 applied to immigrants from the United States, Europe, Palestine and to people of the Jewish faith. Other new laws encouraging immigration followed in the presidencies of Vicente Mejía Colindres (1878–1966) and Tiburcio Carías Andino (1876–1969).

In the late 19th century and early twentieth century, immigrants from the United States worked in Honduras' banana growing and mining industries. They made up the majority of the workers in these industries. American investment began with the Rosario Mining Company, followed by the founding of the United Fruit Company, and the Standard Fruit Company.

== Missionaries ==
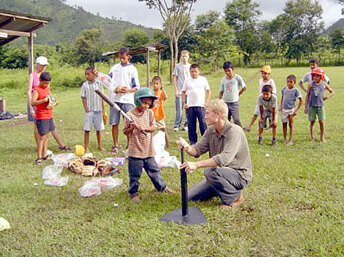
A peace corps volunteer plays Baseball with some honduran children from the villages.

The first missionaries in Honduras were the Mercedarians who arrived with the Spanish in 1563. In 1793, the first Church of England missionary, Christian Frederick Post arrived in British Honduras. In 1896, the first American Protestant missionaries, arrived in Honduras. They were Evangelists from the Central American Mission founded by Cyrus I. Scofield. From the 1930s, the Unity of Brethren have been important in Honduras religion.

== Military presence ==
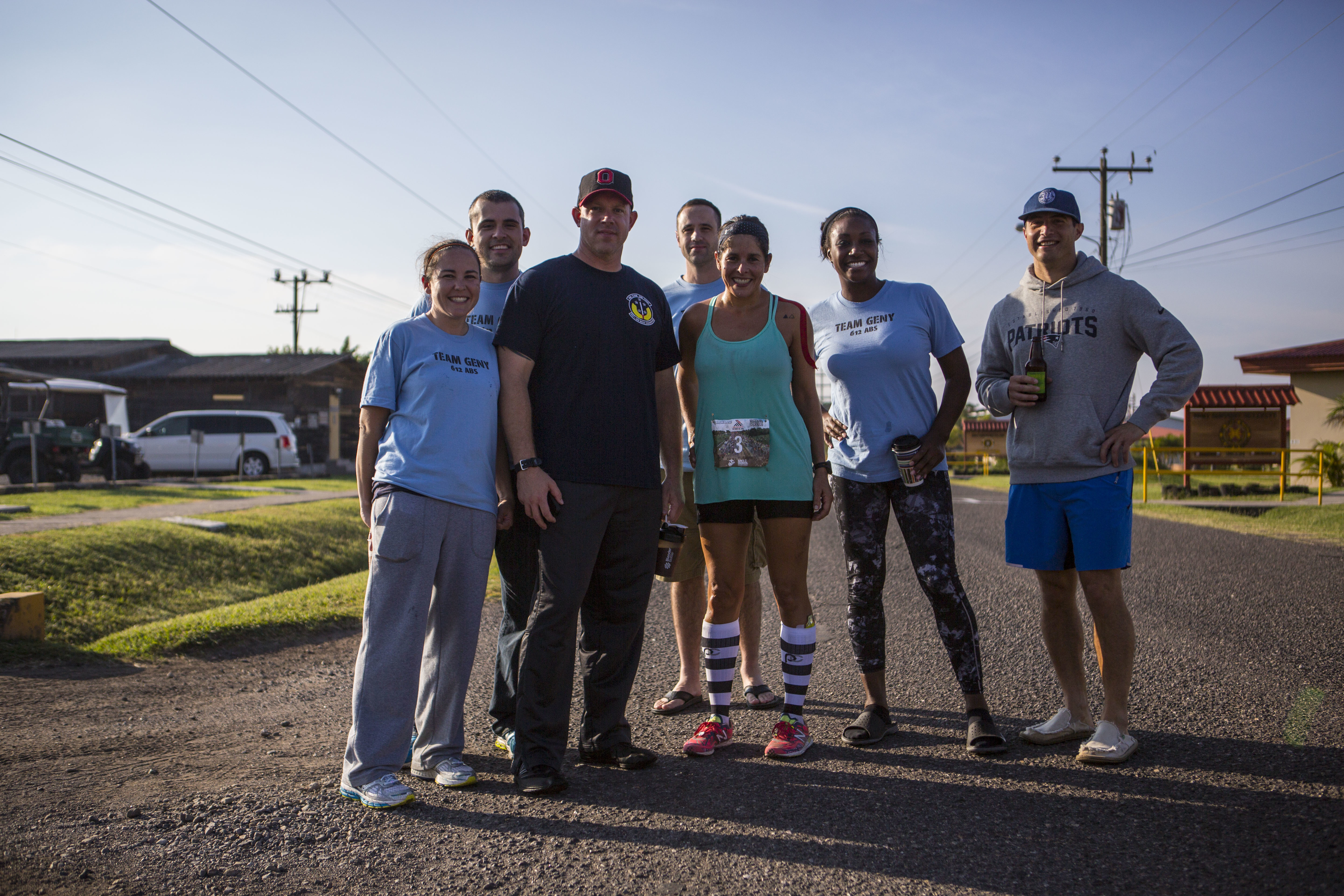
US Marines in Comayagua.

For many years, the U.S. has had vested interests in Honduras and a focus on keeping access to the isthmus between North and South America. Protection of these interests has involved keeping the Honduras government stable, preventing Communist influence in the Honduras region and intervening to stop neighbouring unrest, using Honduras as a launch pad.

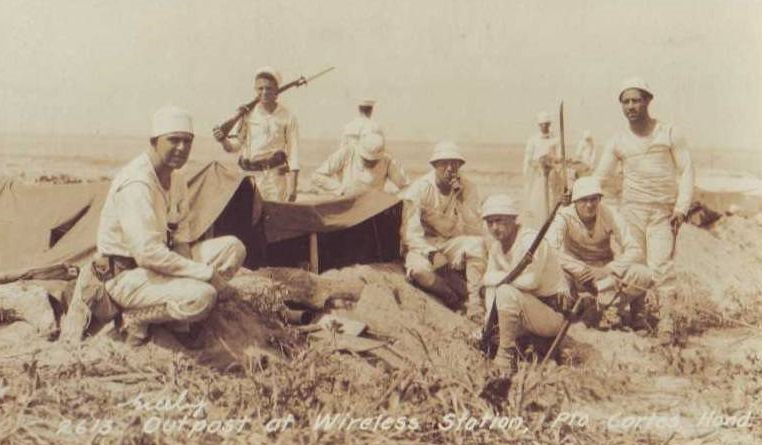
American sailors in Puerto Cortes, 1903

From March 23 to 31, 1903, Marines protected the U.S. consulate and the steamship wharf at Puerto Cortes when Manuel Bonilla deposed Juan Ángel Arias Boquín. Between February and June 1907, during a war between Honduras and Nicaragua, U.S. Marines under the command of Captain William Freeland Fullam (1885–1926) protected Americans in Puerto Cortes, La Ceiba and Trujillo. In 1911 and 1912, Marines protected U.S. interests during Honduran civil unrest.

In 1919 and 1924, the U.S. again intervened to ease Honduran civil unrest. The 1919 episode ended with general elections. On February 15, 1924, nine officers and 167 marines from the USS Milwaukee landed at Ampala. The force remained to protect the U.S. Legation until April 30, 1924. Other troops arrived including troops from the USS Billingsley under the command of V. H. Godfrey; troops from the USS Denver under E. W. Sturdevant from March 3 to 15, 1924; and under T. H. Cartwright from February 19, 1924 to January 27, 1925. Further troops landed at La Cieba under the command of R. L. Nelson between March 8 and 15, 1924 and under J. M. Bain between September 7 to 21, 1924.

On March 16, 1988, the U.S. launched Operation Golden Pheasant. 3,200 U.S. troops were deployed to Honduras at the request of the President of Honduras, José Azcona del Hoyo (1925–2005). Their mission was to contain the Sandinista National Liberation Front of Nicaragua which was considered by President Reagan to be supported by the Soviet Union.

From the 1980s, the United States Air Force has had a permanent presence of about 600 troops in Honduras at the Soto Cano Air Base at Palmerola, south of Comayagua. It has been a base for security and for foreign aid in Central America.

== First registers of Americans in Honduras ==
The number of American immigrants to Honduras has gradually increased.

Year	Registered
1887	185 people
1910	668 people
1926	1,757 people
1930	1,313 people
1935	1,508 people

In 2013, approximately 29,000 people who were not native to the nation lived in Honduras. 23,577 individuals were from North America. 2,939 were from Europe, 2,603 from Asia (1,415 Chinese), 56 from Africa, and 19 from Oceania. However the increase of foreigners liveing in Honduran solil has increased the last decade, by 2023 more than 21,000 americans live in Honduras.

== See also ==
- Arab immigration to Honduras
- Spanish Hondurans
- History of the Jews in Honduras
- Immigration to Honduras
