= Hondurans =

People of Honduras

Hondurans Hondureños
- Flag of Honduras

Total population
- Honduras 9.942 million

Regions with significant populations
- United States: 773,045
- Spain: 99,418 – 149,949 (2022)
- Mexico: 38,764
- Nicaragua: 13,110
- El Salvador: 11,878
- Belize: 9,784
- Guatemala: 9,023
- Canada: 8,382
- Costa Rica: 4,708
- Italy: 3,225
- Panama: 1,797
- Germany: 1,596
- Switzerland: 740
- United Kingdom: 694
- Colombia: 690
- France: 669
- Netherlands: 574
- Ecuador: 489
- Dominican Republic: 442
- Sweden: 410
- Australia: 343
- Belgium: 322
- Peru: 311
- Guinea: 285
- Venezuela: 275
- Bolivia: 257
- Jamaica: 162
- Brazil: 160
- Denmark: 155
- Norway: 133

Languages
- Spanish; Indigenous languages

Religion
- Predominantly Roman Catholic and Protestant; irreligious and other religious minorities exist Indigenous Amerindian religion

Related ethnic groups
- Spaniards; Honduran Americans; Mexicans; Arabs; Afro-Latin American; Afro-Hondurans; Mestizos; Garifunas; Mayans; Lenca; Guatemalans; Salvadorans

Hondurans (Spanish: Hondureños; also called catrachos) are the citizens of Honduras. Most Hondurans live in Honduras, although there is also a significant Honduran diaspora, particularly in the United States, Spain, and many smaller communities in other countries around the world.

== Catracho or Catracha ==
Latin Americans refer to a person from Honduras as a catracho or catracha. The term was coined by Nicaraguans in the mid-19th century when Honduran General Florencio Xatruch returned from battle with his Honduran and Salvadoran soldiers after defeating American freebooters commanded by William Walker, whose purpose was to re-establish slavery and take over all of Central America. As the general and his soldiers returned, some Nicaraguans yelled out ¡Aquí vienen los xatruches!, meaning "Here come Xatruch's boys!" However, Nicaraguans had so much trouble pronouncing the general's Catalan last name that they altered the phrase to los catruches and ultimately settled on las catrachas or los catrachos.

== History ==
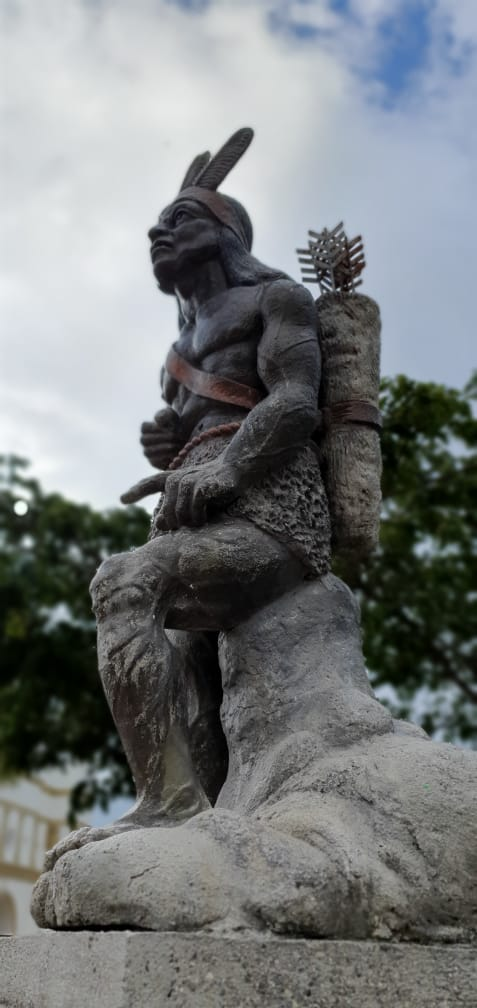
Lempira, native hero of the Lenca culture.

Before the conquest, "Honduras was inhabited by an aboriginal population descended from different ethnic groups." 1 Among these are: Los Lencas, Payas, Chorotegas, Xicaques, Chortis, just to mention a few. All of these groups lacked "cultural unity," and "probably had a Mesoamerican and South American cultural origin. "According to some historians: «These cultures achieved great progress in the various fields of human knowledge, driven by the development of a varied agriculture ... In this way they guaranteed adequate food for their large population. They also applied techniques of great perfection in fabrics and ceramics. They developed an intense and varied trade. »

In the north-western section of Honduras predominated the peoples of the Chortís, a Mayan group located in Copán and Ocotepeque, and the Lencas that extended through the departments of Santa Bárbara, Lempira, Intibucá, La Paz, Comayagua, Francisco Morazán and Valle. And part of what today comprises the territory of El Salvador.

The rest of the Honduran territory was inhabited by peoples from the south of the continent, with a nomadic and semi-nomadic culture, governed by primitive communal production relations. Among these peoples were Tolupanes (also known as "xicaques"), Pechs (also known as "payas"), Tawahkas and Misquitos who, as a whole, made up the majority of the country's population.

According to the Honduran sociologist Guillermo Molina Chocano, the first counts of the Honduran population are the product of estimates made by "historians, chroniclers, and travelers." Most of these coincide that upon the arrival of the Spanish, the aboriginal population both in Honduras and the rest of America was very numerous. For example, the Milanese traveler, Girolaneo Benzoni (Historia del Nuevo Mundo, 1572) assures that:

"When the Spanish went to conquer the region of Honduras ... they encountered more than four hundred thousand Indians ..."Others (El Costo de la Conquista, 1992) claim that "the aboriginal population of Honduras was approximately 800,000 indigenous people."

For some historians, "the starting point to study the population is the general census for the province of Honduras prepared by the mayor Don Ramón de Anguiano", which gave a population of 130,000 in 249 inhabited centers in 1801. If the evolution of the Honduran population is compared, since the end of the 16th century, "with the figures of 1778, 1791 and In 1801, no substantial modifications are observed in the behavior of the population..." in such a way, says Molina Chocano, "that it is not possible to specify the evolution of the population in the Colonial period as a whole." However, some phenomena can be detected in the transitional years towards the republican stage and throughout the 19th century.

In 1816, five years before independence, "the Mayor Don Juan Antonio Tomos issued a report of his visit in 1815, in which he indicated 100,000 inhabitants in 39 curatos and 8 villages of Caribbean blacks near Trujillo (estimated at 10,000) for a total of 110,000 inhabitants." After independence, the 1826 population (200,000 people) is based on a calculation made by Mr. Dionisio de Herrera, former head of the state of Honduras; another estimate in 1850 (350,000 people) was made by Mr. E. G. Squier. If the estimate of 1826 is taken into account and compared with the calculation of the Archbishop of Guatemala, Don Francisco de Paula García Peláez, in 1838 (173,365 inhabitants; 21,165 Spaniards, 106,668 Ladinos and 45,532 Indians), a clear decrease in the rate of population growth can be observed in the years after independence and during the existence of the Central American Federation.

== Demographics ==
Considering metropolitan areas only, the Honduran capital is the fourth largest Central American urban agglomeration, after Guatemala City, Managua, and San Salvador.

=== Population ===
In 2017 Honduras had a population of more than 9 million people. Honduras had a population of 7.4 million according to the Honduras 2001 Census of Population. The most populous Departments are: Cortés (1.2 million), Francisco Morazán (1.2 million), Yoro (466,000), Olancho (420,000), Choluteca (391,000) and Comayagua (353,000). The least populous are Bay Islands and Gracias a Dios.

According to the same source, the main cities are: Tegucigalpa (894,000-Central District only), San Pedro Sula (517,000), Choloma (160,000), La Ceiba (140,000), El Progreso (106,000), Choluteca, Comayagua, Puerto Cortés, La Lima and Danlí. However, the main metropolitan areas are Tegucigalpa (1,200,000-est. 2007-) and San Pedro Sula (900,000). Between the 1988 and 2001 Census, San Pedro Sula's population doubled. The country has 20 cities with more than 20,000 inhabitants.

According to the 2013 census Hondurans are:

| Group | Total | % |
|---|---|---|
| Mestizo | 6,886,470 | 82.93 |
| White | 653,637 | 7.87 |
| Indigenous | 601,824 | 7.25 |
| Garifuna | 61,617 | 0.74 |
| Black | 54,178 | 0.65 |
| Other | 46,046 | 0.55 |

== Ethnic groups ==
=== Mestizos ===
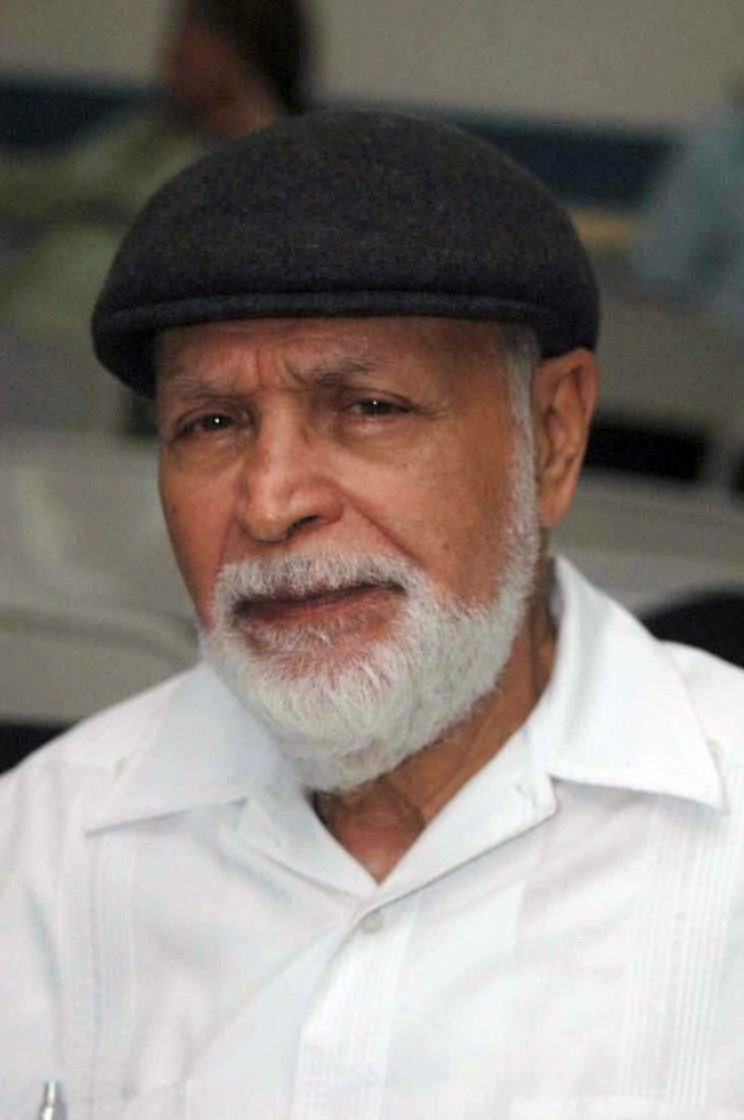
Poet Roberto Sosa.

The majority of the Honduran population is Mestizo (a mixture of Spaniards and Amerindian), Hondurans are descended from immigrants from Spain and Amerindian people like the Lencas and Mayans. Honduran mestizaje should not only be limited to being understood as the mixture between the Spanish and Native Americans, some of these people also have significant African ancestry ranging from 10% - 35% on average mainly due to the mixture with African descent people such as Bay Island Creoles, and the Garifuna peoples of the Caribbean.

=== Blacks ===
The Afro-Honduran population are around 1-2%. They mainly reside on the country's Caribbean or Atlantic coast. The black population comes from a number of sources. Many are the descendants of the West Indian islands. Another large group are the Garífuna, descendants of an Afro-Carib population which revolted against British authorities on the island of St. Vincent and were forcibly moved to Belize and Honduras during the 18th century. Garífunas are part of Honduran identity through theatrical presentations such as Louvavagu.

=== Amerindian ===
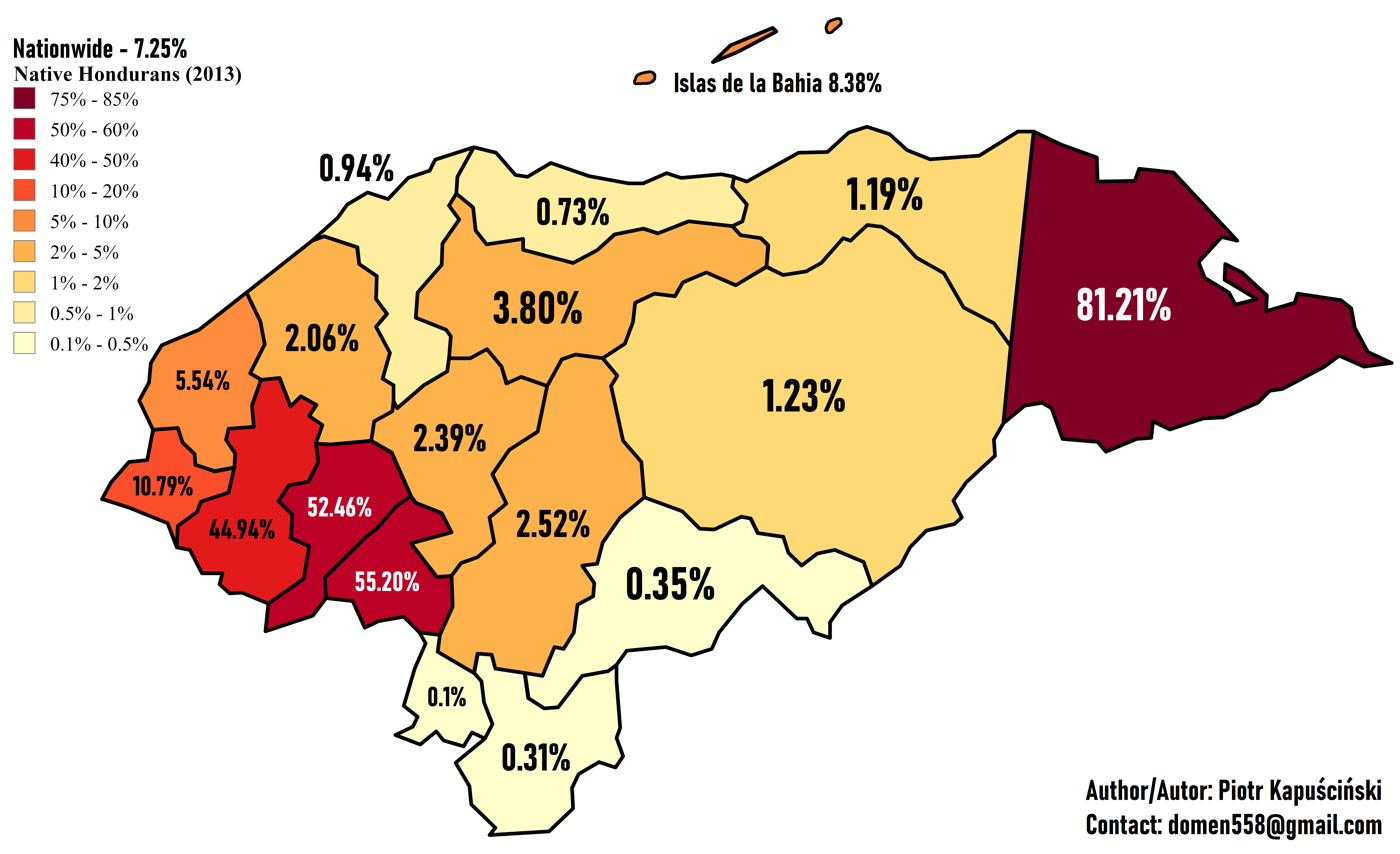
Distribution of Native Hondurans according to the 2013 census

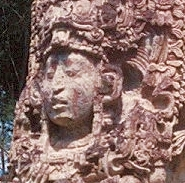
Stele of King Uaxaclajuun Ub'aah K'awiil of Copan. The Mayan-Chorti presence has been strong in western Honduras.

The Amerindian population consists of seven indigenous groups recognized by the Confederation of Autochthonous Peoples of Honduras (CONPAH) and the government of Honduras, among them they recognize the Afro-Caribbean and Garífuna groups which are not Amerindian.

The seven indigenous groups are: the Ch'orti', a Mayan group living in the northwest on the border with Guatemala; the Garifuna speaking a Cariban language, which live along the entire Caribbean coastline of Honduras, and in the Bay Islands; the Pech or Paya Indians living in a small area in the Olancho department; the Tolupan (also called Jicaque, "Xicaque", or Tol), living in the Department of Yoro and in the reserve of the Montaña de la Flor and parts of the department of Yoro; the Lenca Indians living in the western highlands of Intibuca, Lempira, La Paz, Valle and Choluteca departments; and the Miskito Indians living on the northeast coast in the Gracias A Dios department and along the border with Nicaragua.

=== Whites ===
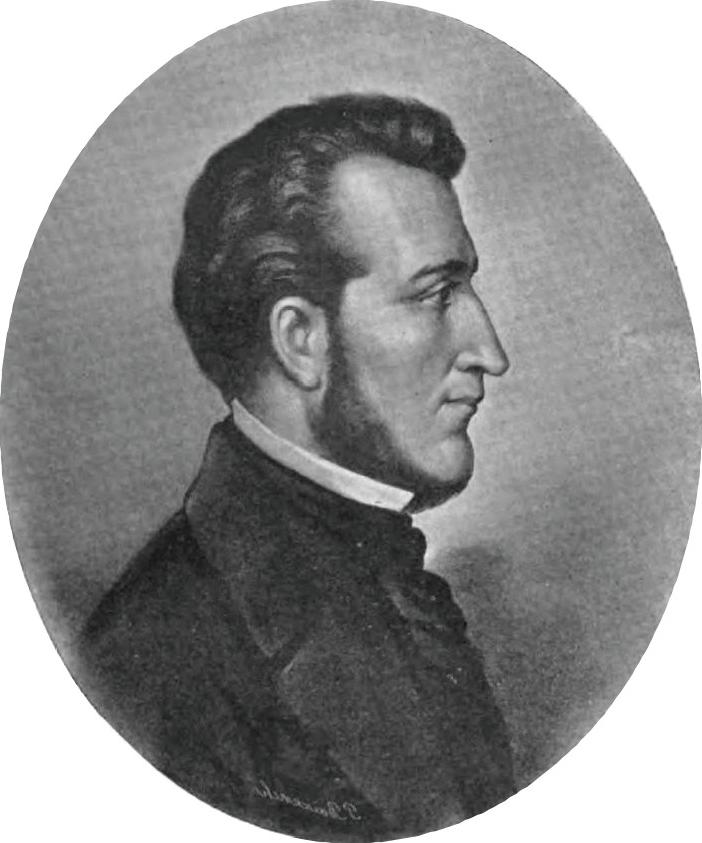
Honduran hero Francisco Morazán. He was of Italian-Spaniard ancestry.

White Hondurans or white people from Honduras (colloquially called cheles), is a term used to refer to those Hondurans who are cataloged or considered as white people. However, the term white in Honduras similar to other Latin American countries is quite ambiguous, and some white people would not be classified as such in other countries. The first whites in Honduras came with Columbus in 1502, during the entire 16th century came a huge spaniard migration to Honduras. Whites of Honduran origin are also descended from immigrants who arrived from Europe, such as places like Spain, Germany, Italy and East Europe in the 19th and 20th centuries. Percentages have varied from 1% to 7%.

== Genetics ==
As mentioned, the Honduran population is predominantly Mestizo with more than 80% of the country's population identifying themselves with this group. Talk of miscegenation in Honduras not only goes with the traditional mixtures of Native Americans and Spanish settlers but also the mixing with other populations. Due to the migratory flows made after the Liberal Reform other ethnic groups have come to mix with the local Honduran population since then.

A study showed that Hondurans share a large number of genetic patterns with Spaniards and Italians, being more than what was initially believed, giving a closer approximation than what was initially believed with the european Mediterranean populations and the Honduran people. Another study carried out on general Honduran mestizo population and Garífuna samples from the Caribbean coast of Honduras, showed the following results:

additionally, two different studies have been conducted one by kireports.org and the second one conducted by AHAIASA Journals. Between 284-295 samples were used between the two research studies. Both studies showed almost evenly split admixture of Indigenous American, and European ancestry, while retaining significant African ancestry as well likely influenced by the slave trade.

| Population | European | African | Indigenous |
|---|---|---|---|
| Honduras | 41.0% | 21.0%% | 38.0% |
| Garífunas | 26.0% | 62.0% | 12.0% |

== Religion ==
=== Indigenous faiths ===
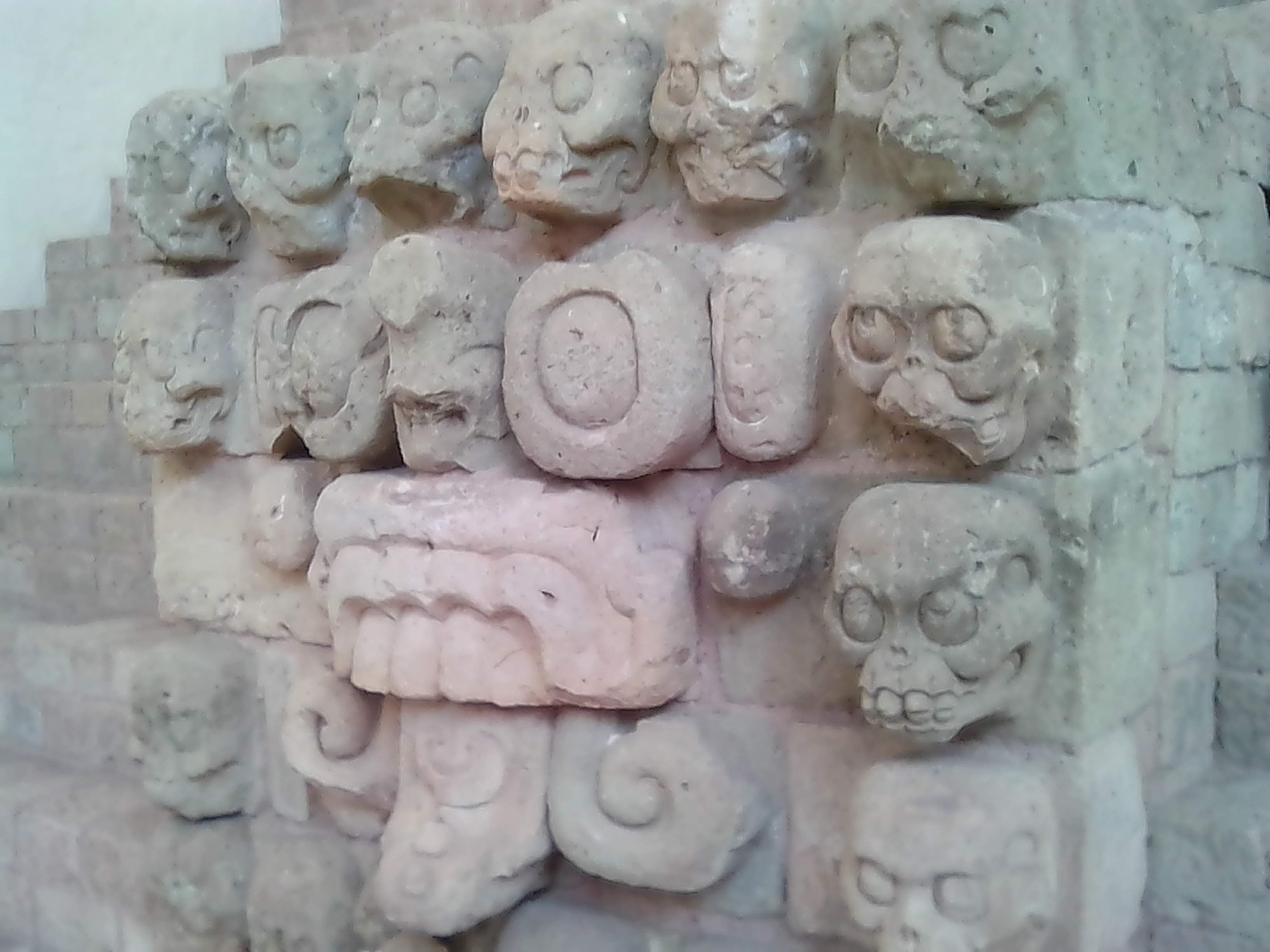
Mayan rain god Chaac at the Mayan Sculpture museum.

While the country is dominated by Christianity, indigenous peoples typically maintain elements of their original spiritualities in a sort of syncretism.

=== Garifuna religion ===
The Garífuna religion is the Dugú, it is a mixture of African, Catholic, and indigenous beliefs.

=== Christianity ===
Today, Hondurans are primarily Catholic with 46% and Protestants 41%, dividing equally between Protestants and Catholics. Historically, at the beginning of the 20th century, due to the influence of the United States that arrived during this period, Protestants outnumbered the Catholics, representing two-thirds of the country, mainly in the north. Another Christian community in Hondurans are Orthodox, mostly composed by Arab Hondurans, more than 600 families are part of the Orthodox Church of Antioch.

With the loss of the Protestant regions after World War II, coupled with the increase in agnosticism and atheism in the eastern region of the country the Protestant population decreased. Today there are rural and urban regions where Protestantism has ceased to predominate.

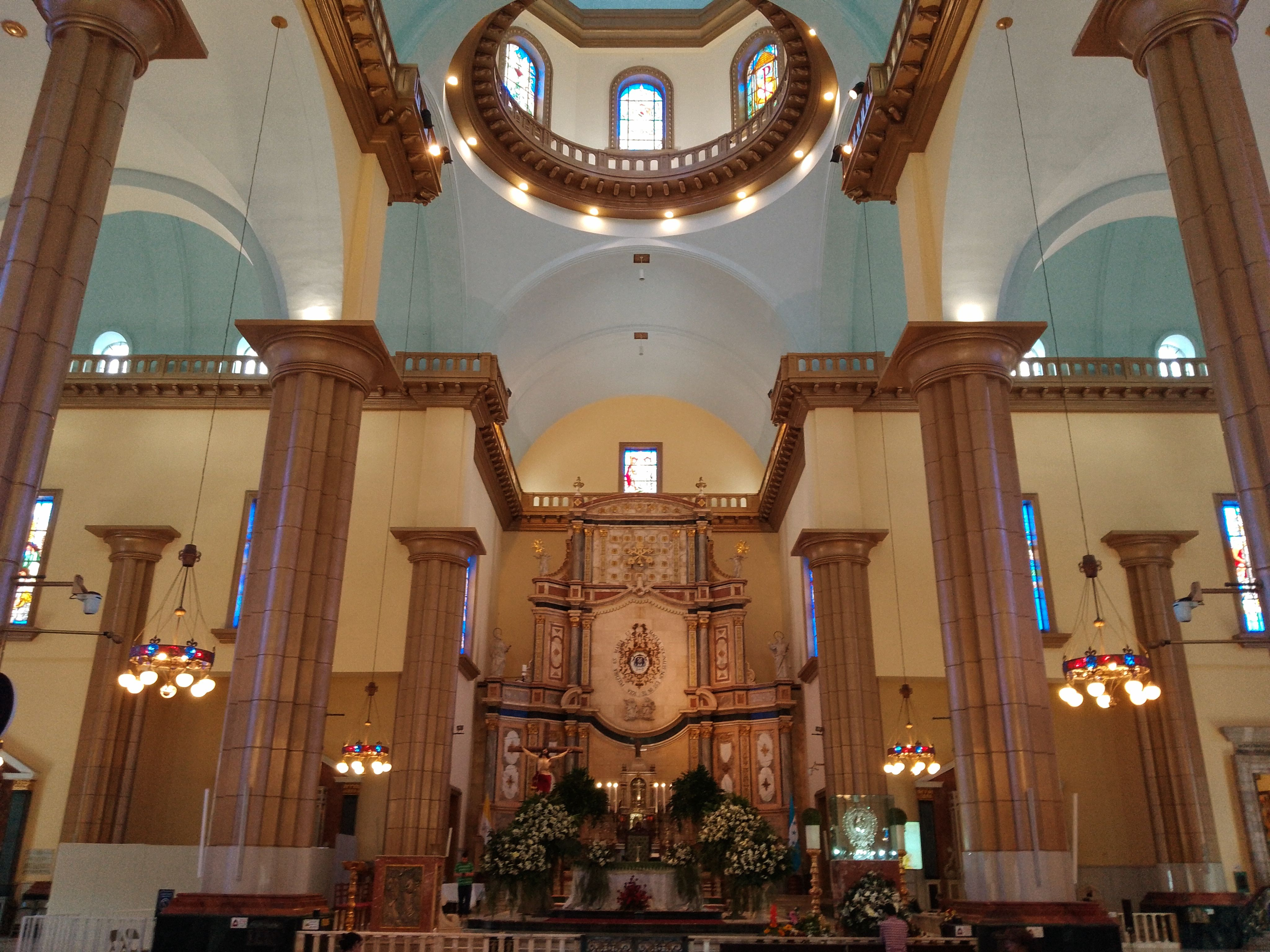
Roman Catholic Basilica of Our Lady of Suyapa in Tegucigalpa.

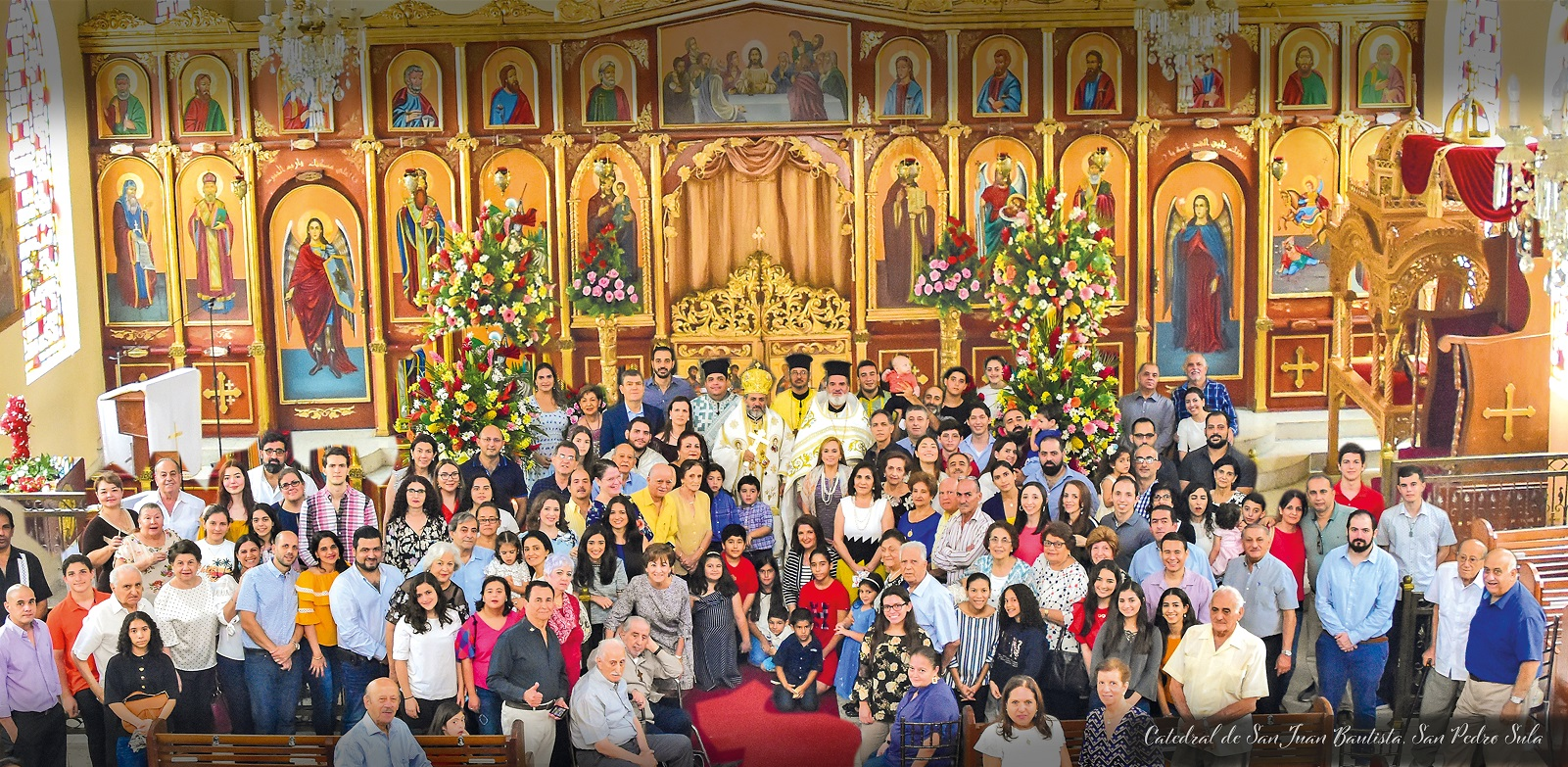
Honduran Orthodox Christians in San Pedro Sula.

=== Atheists and nonreligious ===
A survey found that 23% of Hondurans are considered without religion (15% non-religious and 8% atheists).

=== Other religions ===
Honduras has small communities of Jews, Muslims, and Baháʼís.

== Culture ==
Honduras is a multi-ethnic and multicultural country with a heritage of more than 12 thousand years of history. 8% of the Honduran population is indigenous from different groups or ethnicities that have left their mark on both the culture and the gastronomy of the country. Another element is Spanish, which left a deep mark on the culture of the country. The popular culture of the Honduran people, as in most countries, consists of artistic creations attended by large audiences or shows. Such artistic-cultural exhibitions are held during certain days of the year through very creative celebrations.

=== Holidays ===
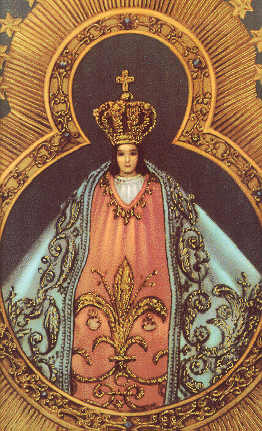
Our lady of Suyapa.

Among the most popular holidays are; on September 15, Honduras' independence day. This commemoration is carried out with parades of schools and colleges throughout the country. Some companies also participate who adorn the parade with floats of any kind. Since the conquest of Honduras, the predominant religion in the country is Catholic, because of this, special interest is given to the Holy Week celebrations.

The day of the Virgin of Suyapa is celebrated on February 3 of each year with a great pilgrimage to Tegucigalpa to give it veneration. During the Easter holidays, most of the population takes advantage of this holiday week that begins on Wednesday and ends on Sunday to walk on the beaches and spas of the country, and enjoy the tropical summer that is only enjoyed at this time of year mainly on the North and South Coast of Honduras.

=== Literature ===
Literature in Honduras dates back to the Mayan codices, although new literary genres were introduced after the conquest. Among the most notable writers of Honduras are David Fortin, Froylán Turcios, Juan Ramón Molina, Rafael Heliodoro Valle, Antonio José Rivas, Clementina Suárez, Ramón Amaya Amador, Marco Antonio Rosa, Roberto Sosa, Lucila Gamero de Medina, Roberto Quezada, Armando García, Helen Umaña, Alberto Destephen, Argentina Díaz Lozano, Rony Bonilla and Julio Escoto.

=== Cinema ===
Cinema in the country has its true beginning in 1962. The first official Honduran filmmaker was Sami Kafati, who studied cinematography in Rome in the 1960s. His first cinematographic work was the experimental short film Mi Amigo Ángel. Produced in 1962, it is the first fictional cinematographic work produced in Honduras. According to the Honduran film historian Marxis Lenin Hernández "the film was not so well received in its time, but today it is highly valued." This short film has a great expressive force and a great social and artistic sensitivity. The most prominent modern Honduran filmmakers are Hispano Duron, Rene Pauck, and Juan Carlos Fanconi.

== See also ==
- Arab immigration to Honduras
- Criollo people
- Culture of Honduras
- Hispanics
- History of Honduras
- History of the Jews in Honduras
- Honduran Americans
- Human rights in Honduras
- Italian migration to Honduras
- Spaniards in Honduras
