= Arab immigration to Honduras =

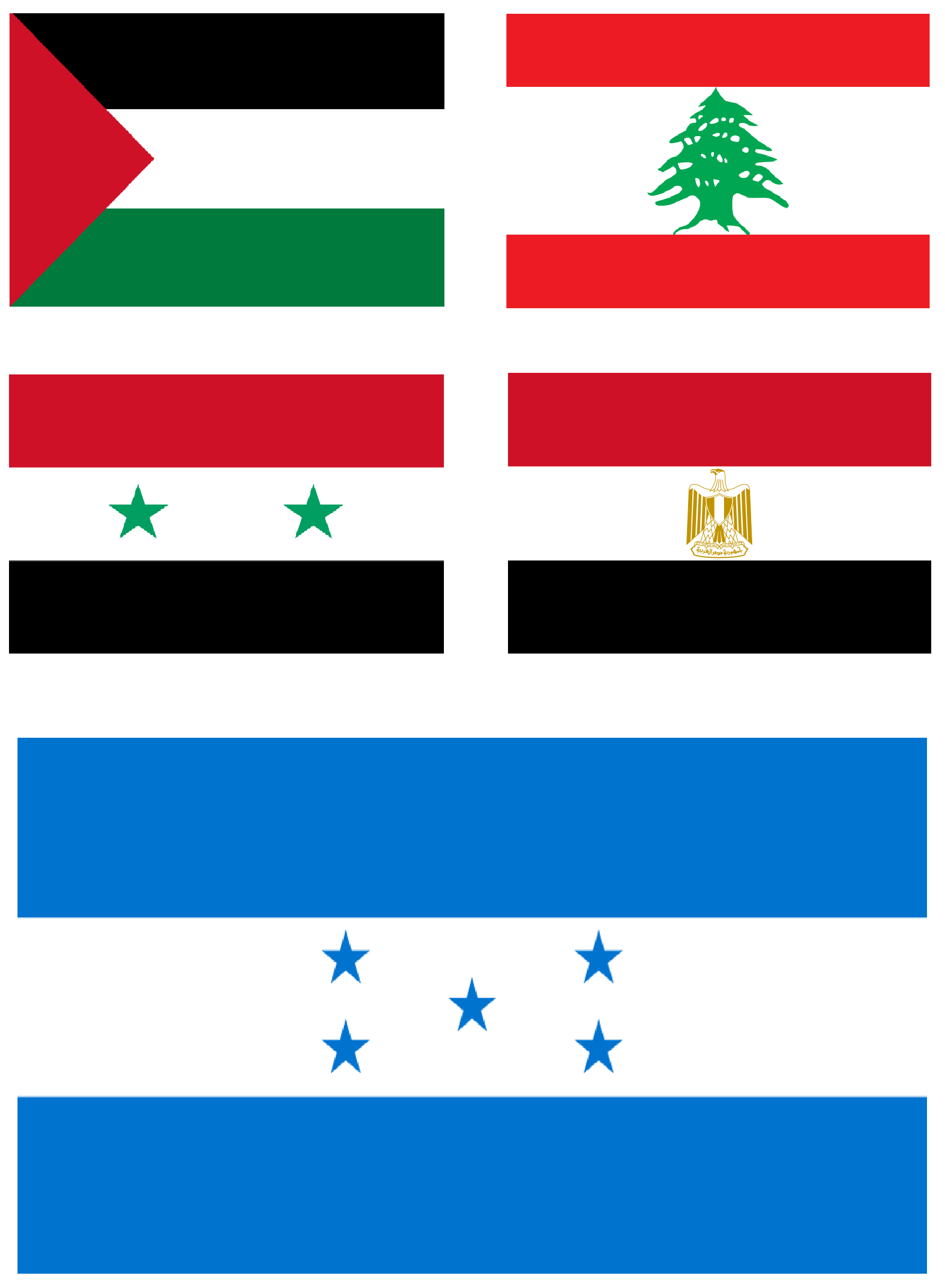

Total population
- Various estimates: 175,000 Palestinian Arab descents (Euraque, 2009).; 320,000 Palestinian Arab descents (Espín, 2020).

Languages
- Honduran Spanish, Arabic, English

Religion
- Roman Catholicism, Eastern Orthodox Church (majority), Islam (minority)

Related ethnic groups
- Palestinians, Lebanese, Jews

Arab immigration to Honduras began in the 19th century with the liberal reforms of President Marco Aurelio Soto (1876–1883), who saw immigration as a determining factor in the development of capitalism in Central America, and sought to establish an attractive environment for foreign investment. The largest Arab community in Honduras is the people of Palestinian descent, the majority of whom (95%) are Christian (Catholic and Orthodox). The approximate population of Honduran Arabs is more than 320,000 people, around 300,000 Palestinians and 20,000 Lebanese, estimates place the Muslim population at about 11,000.

== History ==
=== Background ===
Relatively few Arabs immigrated to Honduras during the 19th century. Under conservative General Captain José María Medina (1862-1876), the National Congress issued the first immigration law on February 26, 1866, allowing willing foreigners to reside in the country. Afterwards, the liberal reformer Dr. Marco Aurelio Soto (1876-1883) published the Political Constitution of 1876, which reflected the importance he placed on immigration for national development, including those from North America (many displaced by the aftermath of the Civil War), Europe, the Middle East and Asia, etc. The government of General Luis Bográn (1883-1891) also emphasized immigration as a means to increase the national population, develop the labor force, further exploit the country's natural resources; in Honduras he offered foreigners the opportunity to treat with equality, a cordial welcome, security, and especially an influence on the Honduran national identity. Constantino Nini is cited as the first Arab to settle in Honduras in 1893, even before Christians were legally allowed to leave the Ottoman Empire in 1895.

=== 20th century ===
The early 20th century saw a major increase in Arab immigration to Honduras following crisis in the Ottoman Empire and World War I. In the early 20th century, Gonzalo "Chalo" Luque noted the names of many Palestinian-Arab heads-of-household in San Pedro Sula, and Mario Posas made a similar list for the developing banana plantations near La Ceiba. In 1920, Palestinian Arabs made up just 0.5% of the Honduran population according to documents from the Ministry of Foreign Relations, and the 1935 census showed just 47 "Turks" and 721 Palestinians out of a total population of 960,000. (Because many immigrants had passports from the Ottoman Empire, Arab Hondurans acquired the generic nickname of "Turcos".) However, several researchers suggest that there had been a wave of Middle Eastern immigrants to Central America in the 1920s and 1930s; hundreds of families settled primarily in Honduras, with nearly 25,000 Arabs in San Pedro Sula alone by 1930, and over 40,000 by 1940. Many of these immigrants were well-educated, and many came from Bethlehem or surrounding villages which allowed them to form cohesive and supportive social networks. Fluency in English allowed early coffee grinders to establish trade relationships with Belize and North America, and by the early 20th century, Arab families owned over 40% of local businesses according to one survey.

In 1939 the Tegucigalpa Arab community organized the "Society Union Arab Youth" under the leadership of Gabriel Kattán and Nicolás Larach, which led to the founding of similar associations in Cuba, El Salvador, Guatemala, Mexico and Nicaragua. This organization published a weekly newspaper, Rumbos ("Directions"), and produced an exclusive radio program for Radio HRN. In 1968, eight Arab-Honduran members of this Society purchased six acres in a suburb of San Pedro Sula where they built a swimming pool. This eventually grew into the US$15 million Arab-Honduran Social Center complex, which included some 1,600 families as club members by 2001.

=== Modern day ===
Estimates placed the Palestinian Arab population at between 150,000 and 200,000 at the beginning of the 21st century, a percentage second only to Chile in the Americas.

== Notable Arab-Hondurans ==
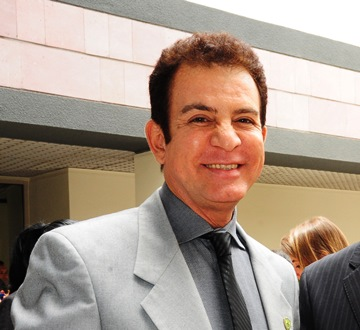
Salvador Nasralla, is a Honduran engineer, TV host, and politician, son of Arab immigrants.

Despite comprising only approximately three percent of the country's population, Arab Houndurans are major players in the country's economy, politics, arts, and sciences.

=== Business and politics ===
- Victoria Asfura, politician and former President of the Central Bank of Honduras
- Miguel Facussé Barjum, founder and president of Corporación Dinant, chief economic advisor (1982–1986)
- Miguel Andonie Fernández, founder of the Innovation and Unity Party
- Carlos Roberto Flores, President of Honduras (1998–2002)
- Juan Bendeck, businessman, politician, and minister
- William Handal Raudales, politician
- Gabriel Kattan, businessman, politician
- Elías Canahuati, founder of Canahuati Tobacco
- Óscar Kafati, president of El Indio Coffee Mills, former minister of Economic Development
- Juan Kawas, 1898 immigrant and leading importer of wines and spirits
- Salvador Nasralla, first vice president of Honduras (2022–2024), TV host
- Fredy Nasser, businessman
- Pedro Atala, former president of CD Motagua
- Eduardo Atala, current president of CD Motagua
- Alfredo Hawit, president of FENAFUTH
- Margarita Dabdoub Sikaffi, former mayor of La Ceiba
- Nasry Asfura, president of Honduras and former mayor of Tegucigalpa
- Jorge Canahuati Larach, businessman
- Mario Canahuati, former ambassador to the United States
- Schucry Kafie, founder of Lacthosa
- Esteban Handal Pérez, politician
- Ricardo Jaar, businessman
- Mariela Kawas, activist and member of the Palestinian Association of Honduras

=== Literature ===
- Rolando Kattan, poet

=== Cinema and television ===
- Sami Kafati, film director
- Fosi Bendeck, film director
- Michael Bendeck, film producer

=== Science ===
- Roberto A. Dabdoub, Biologist
- Kerim Gattas Asfura, Chemist
- Jeannette Kawas, Environmental activist

== See also ==
- Immigration in Honduras
- Spanish migration to Honduras
- History of the Jews in Honduras
- Italian migration to Honduras
- Honduras–Palestine relations
- American immigration to Honduras
- Islam in Honduras

== Bibliography ==
- Amaya Banegas; Jorge Alberto (1997), Los Árabes y Palestinos en Honduras (1900 - 1950) [The Arabs and Palestinians in Honduras], Tegucigalpa: Guaymuras, p. 159, ISBN 99926-15-51-6
- Euraque, Dario A. (1996) State, Power, Nationality, and Race in the History of Honduras. Editiones Subirana, Tegucigalpa, Honduras.
- Olga Joya and Ricardo Urquía. 1983. State Interventions in the Economic Development of Tegucigalpa, Thesis, History Department UNAH
- Pastor Fasquelle, Rodolfo. Biography of San Pedro Sula, 1536-1954. Centro Editorial, San Pedro Sula, Honduras; 1990.
