= Spanish Hondurans =

Spanish Hondurans- Honduran Spaniards
Hondureños españoles

Total population
- 2,888 (89,000) 89,000 (including those of ancestral descent)

Languages
- Spanish, Catalán, Basque

Religion
- Roman Catholic, Agnosticism

Related ethnic groups
- Italians, Jews, Americans

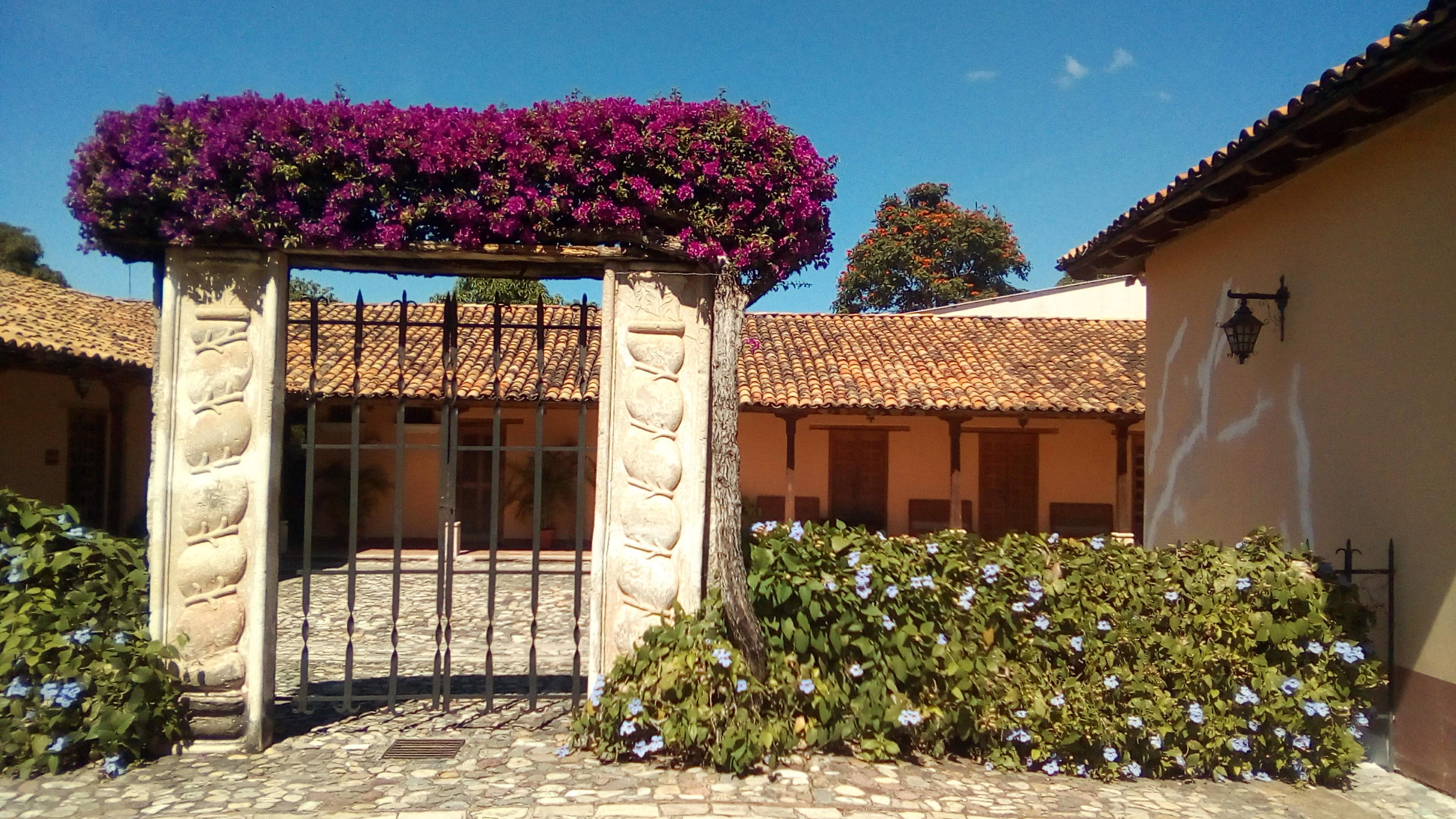
The Spanish colonizers built thousands of Houses and Churches all over Honduras after 1539.

Spanish-Hondurans or Honduran-Spaniards refers to the number of Spanish immigrants and Hondurans with direct Spanish ancestry living in the Republic of Honduras. This country has an important Spanish community that has spread throughout the national territory, this people are part of the white Honduran population. According to the National Institute of Statistics of Spain, in 2009 1,982 Spanish citizens lived in Honduras and by 2017, more than 2,888. Today there are many people with Spaniard ancestry who benefit from the dual nationality that is legally allowed between both countries.

== History ==
=== Colonial era ===
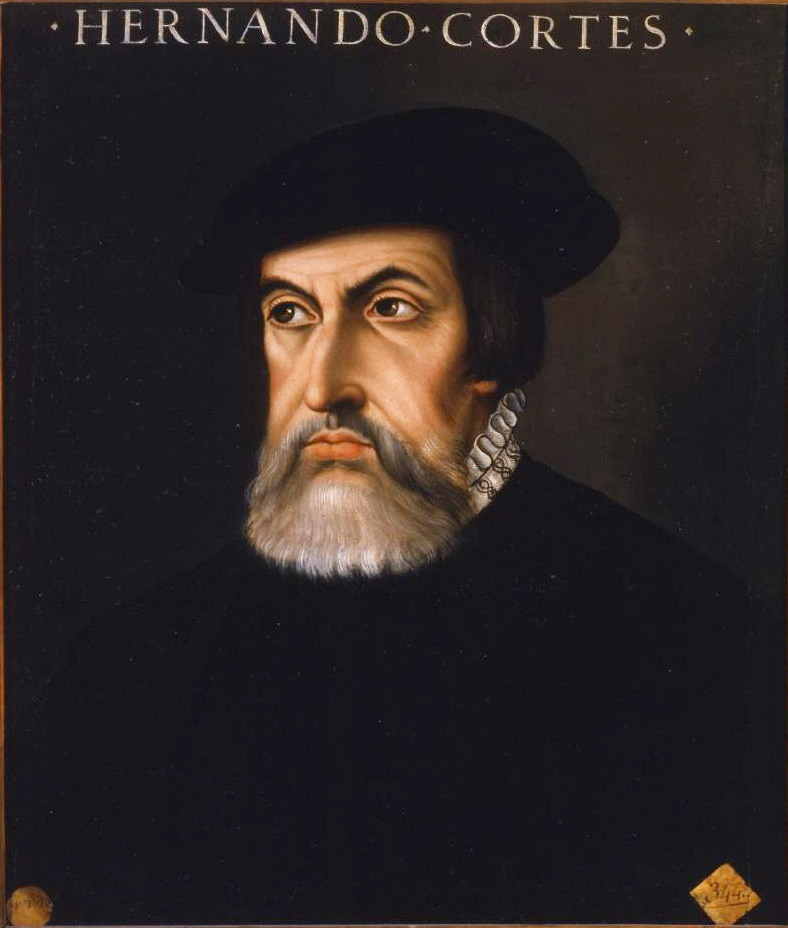
Hernán Cortés arrived to Honduras after the conquest of Mexico.

Spaniards have visited the Honduran territory since 1504 with Columbus' fourth expedition. One of their oldest towns founded was the port of Trujillo, which has one of the oldest Spanish Fortress in America, the Santa Barbara Fortress.

The first Spanish citizen in Honduras was the conquistador Gil González Dávila, who arrived in March 1524. He founded the villa of San Gil de Buena Vista. From there, he forged his way deeper inland, attempting to pacify the indigenous population while simultaneously fighting against other Spaniards who contested his territory. He also hoped to find the outflow of Lake Nicaragua.

Later, Hernán Cortés, motivated by reports of the great wealth of the region, sent two expeditions; one by land and another by sea. The first expedition was led by Pedro of Alvarado and the second by Cristóbal of Olid. After being betrayed by Cristóbal of Olid, Cortés decided to leave Mexico and take matters into his own hands, commanding an expedition that lasted nearly two years and ended in Trujillo, after surviving many dangers and hardships.

Cortés introduced cattle farming to the area, and founded the villa of the Nativity of Our Lady, near Puerto Caballos. Before his return to Mexico in 1526, he installed Hernando of Saavedra as governor of Honduras, and left instructions to treat the indigenous population well.

On 26 October 1526, Diego López of Salcedo was appointed governor of Honduras by the emperor, replacing Saavedra. The following decade was shaped by the personal ambitions of governors and conquistadors, which often came into conflict with the interests of governmental organisation. The colonial Spanish rebelled against their leaders, and the indigenous population rebelled against the Spanish landowners and their abuses. Criollo people were the most determined to obtain independence for Honduras. Paralleling what occurred in the Captaincy General of Guatemala, Honduras-born descendants of Spaniards began a movement to make the country independent, both from the Kingdom of Spain and from the Viceroyalty of New Spain. Liberal reforms were initiated to give them more local control over the economy and education.

Following the early 16th century came a huge migration of Spanish people to the Honduran territory, mostly Andalucians and Extremadurans. By the early years of the Spanish empire, hundred of Spanish settlers rebelled against their leaders, and the Indigenous people did the same against their bosses due to their mistreatment in Hondurans.

=== 17th and 18th centuries ===
From the 17th century and further the Criollos, sons of Spaniards born in America, were mostly the middle-upperclass of Honduras during the era of the Viceroyalty of New Spain due the Imperial Spanish Caste system. By 1801 there were about 1,512 Spanish families in Honduras, about 3% of the total Honduran population. These ones where the ones achieve the independence of Central America. After the independence The liberal reform begins to base the projections of the country in terms of economy and education.

=== 19th century ===
In the first years of Honduran independence, towards the end of the era of free trade between Latin America and Spain, a large proportion of the Spanish people arriving in Honduras were Catalans. Spaniard immigrants started to arrive to Honduras during the mid 19th century most of them from Catalonia.

Honduras was a country that received immigrants from diverse regions of the world. Spanish settlers typically came to start businesses in rural areas, cultivating crops such as coffee, bananas and sugar, which were exported to Spain and other European countries. Such foreign investment in Honduras was a first step towards developing a more robust economy, through the exploitation of natural resources and the generation of wealth and employment, however conflict arose when indigenous chiefdoms seized farms and ranches.

With the acceptance of treaties for the recognition of titles, at the end of the 19th century and beginning of the 20th, through the initiative of president Luís Bográn, the Doctor Antonio Abad Ramírez y Fernández Fontecha (Cádiz, 1855), Honorary Consul of Spain in Tegucigalpa and Rector of the Central University of the Republic of Honduras, President of the Scientific-Literary Academy and President of the Supreme Council of Public Instruction, organised "cultural missions" with the objective of hiring artists and teachers from Spain through orderly immigration.

== 20th century ==
Migration just growth by the time of the Spanish Civil War by 1950 Honduras had near 600 Spanish immigrants. By 2009, more than 1,960 Spanish people were living in Honduras. There were more than 2,888 Spanish citizens living legally in Honduras as of 2017 and nearly 89,000 Hondurans descend from these Spaniard immigrants.

In 1996 the Treaty of Double Nationality between the Spanish State and the Republic of Honduras took effect, which makes citizenship of the two countries compatible. The Historical Memory Law of Spain has also allowed a large number of Hondurans of Spanish origin to recover their Spanish citizenship. Today 89,000 Hondurans are descended from Spanish immigrants.

=== Present-day ===
Spanish immigration to Honduras is protected by the Hispanic-Honduran Agreement for Social Cooperation, which affirms—among other things—"The principle of equality and reciprocity in labour matters, so that Spaniards and Hondurans who work overseas in Honduras or Spain, respectively, enjoy the same labour rights as citizens, after having been accredited by the appropriate labour organizations", and which established the basis for the current cooperation between Spain and Honduras to further economic development. This principle is consistent with the Treaty of Peace and Friendship, whose fifth article establishes that "the nationals of either of the two States will enjoy in the other those privileges have been granted or are granted to the citizens of the most favoured Nation, with the exception of those from Central America".

== Spanish culture in Honduras ==
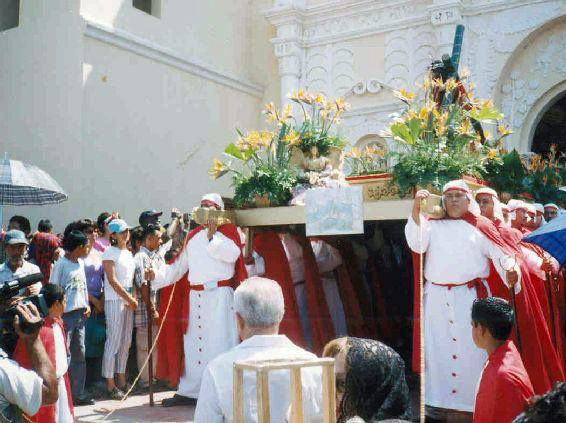
Holy Week in the city of Comayagua.

The Spanish language is Spain's greatest contribution to Honduran culture, and continues to be the main cultural bond between the two countries.

Holy week is part of the Spanish inheritance of the Hondurans, a religious and secular festival that has been celebrated since colonial times.

In the 1950s, Spaniards living in Honduras, and Hondurans who had previously studied in Spain, created the Honduran Institute of Hispanic Culture.

The Spanish community has participated actively for decades in the Festival Folclórico Internacional (International Folklore Festival) in San Pedro Sula.

Honduras established the Cultural Centre of Spain in Tegucigalpa in 2007.

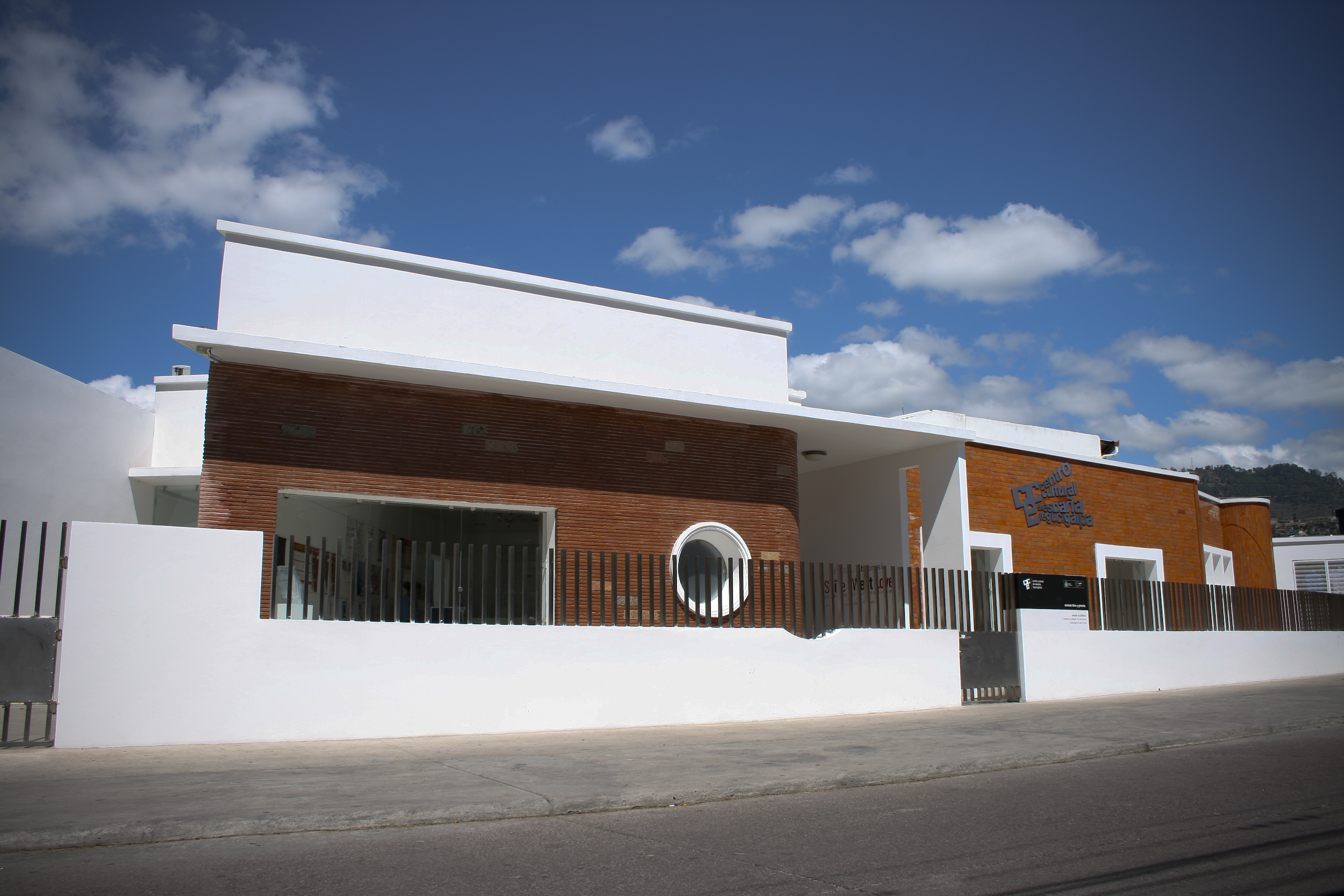
The Cultural Centre of Spain in Tegucigalpa – CCET.

== Spanish communities ==
The city with the largest Spanish population in the country is San Pedro Sula, which is where European, American, and Latin American companies usually begin their investment and industrial projects.

- Associació Catalan d'Hondures, San Pedro Sula
- Spanish Society of San Pedro Sula
- Although it was active for many years, the House of Spain in Tegucigalpa, is not currently operating.
- Spanish Society of Welfare and Culture of Atlántida.
- Territorial Section of Working Commissions in Honduras.

After the creation of the Councils of Residents in Guatemala and Nicaragua, Honduras is one of the last countries of the region without its own Council.

During the reconstruction work after Hurricane Mitch, a network of associations of Spaniards, NGOs, and branches of the Spanish embassy organised national-level distribution for Spain's emergency assistance.

=== Spanish diplomatic relations in Honduras ===
The Spanish embassy in Honduras not only takes responsibility for protecting Spanish citizens who reside in the country temporarily or permanently; through various civil organisations, it has also supported programs to combat poverty and malnutrition in Honduran children, as well as projects to preserve cultural heritage.

- Embassy of Spain in Tegucigalpa
- Honorary Consulate in San Pedro Sula.
- Technical Office of Cooperation
- Cultural Centre of Spain
- Office of Projects of the Andalusian Agency for International Development Cooperation.
- Spanish Official Chamber of Commerce in Honduras.
- The Spanish Agency for International Development Cooperation also has Regional Offices of Projects in Santa Rosa of Copán, La Ceiba and Saint Lorenzo.

== Growth of the Spanish population in Honduras ==
The Spanish population has growth in the past two centuries.

Year	Spanish Population
1877	77
1910	196
1926	464
1930	643
1935	726
1945	589

In 2013, the official census of foreign nationalized Hondurans was 29,000 people, of whom 23,577 were from countries in the American continent, 2,939 from countries in Europe, 56 from countries in Africa, 19 from countries in Oceania, and 2,603 from Asia, of whom 1,415 are Chinese.

== Notable Honduran-Spaniards ==
Some Historical examples of notable Hondurans sons of Spanish immigrants or with direct Spanish ancestry.

- Francisco Morazán
- Florencio Xatruch
- Francisco Bertrand
- Vicente Tosta Carrasco
- José simón Azcona del Hoyo

== See also ==
- Honduras–Spain relations
- Spanish emigration
- Hondurans
- Arab immigration to Honduras
- Italian migration to Honduras
- Immigration in Honduras
- History of Honduras
  - History of the Jews in Honduras
- American immigration to Honduras
- Spanish immigration to Guatemala
- Demographics of Honduras
