= Honduras–Palestine relations =

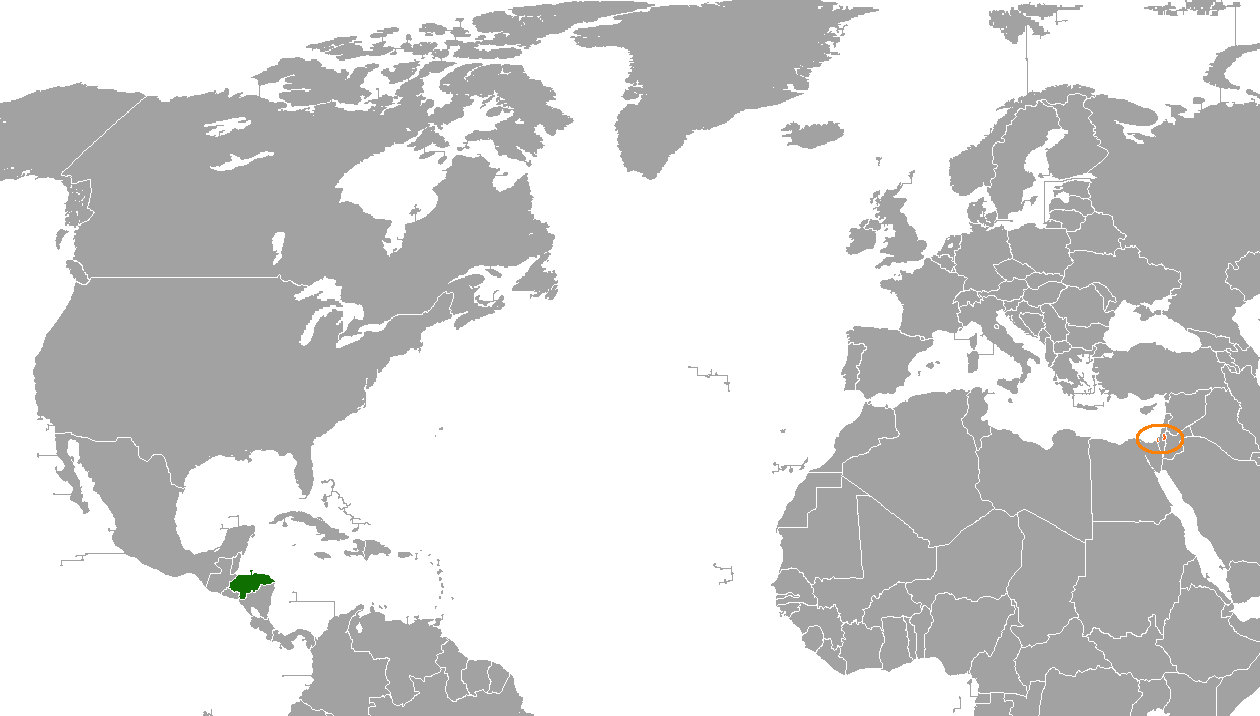

- Honduras: Palestine

Honduras recognized the State of Palestine in 2011, a move in sharp contrast to a long-lasting legacy of close links between successive Honduran governments and the State of Israel.

On May 10, 2013, Honduras and Palestine established diplomatic links at a ceremony in the former's capital city of Tegucigalpa, attended by the foreign ministers of both countries, Mireya Agüero and Riyad al-Maliki, respectively. Al-Maliki also met with Honduras president Porfirio Lobo at the presidential palace. The ambassador of Palestine, Mohamed Saadat, presented his credentials on September 13, 2013.

Honduras has one of the largest Palestinian populations in Latin America. The first recorded case of a Palestinian emigrant to Honduras dates back to 1899. The largest wave of Palestinian migration to Honduras took place between 1922 and 1931. Many of the migrants hailed from Bethlehem, Beit Jala or Beit Sahour. The majority of Palestinian migrants to Honduras were Greek Orthodox. There were also Maronite and Greek Catholic migrants. A minority (roughly 15-20% at one point) were Muslims. However, later most of the descendants of Orthodox migrants later adopted Catholicism. Many Palestinian descendants have come to occupy important positions in Honduran society. A Palestinian descendant, Carlos Roberto Flores, was elected President of Honduras in 1998.

In 1947, Honduras abstained from voting on the Partition of Palestine in the United Nations General Assembly.

== See also ==
- Foreign relations of Honduras
- Foreign relations of Palestine
- Arab immigration to Honduras
