= Honduras–Spain relations =

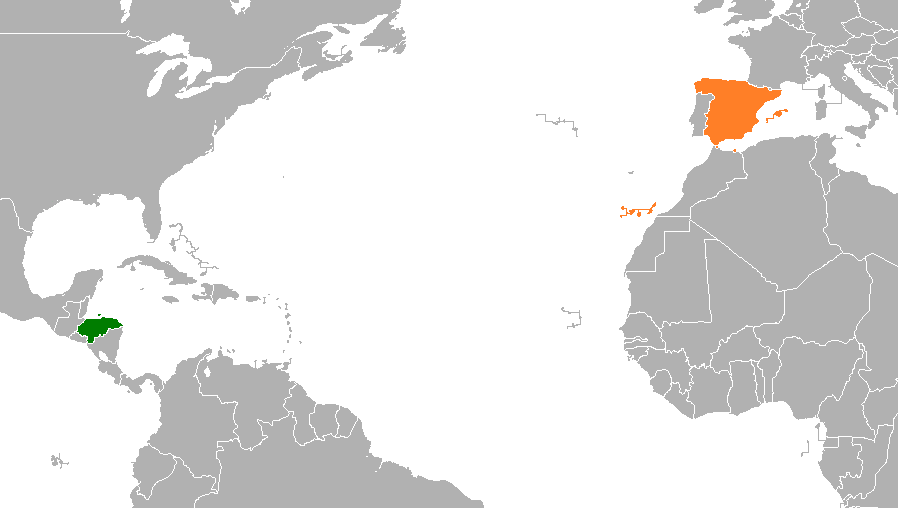

- Honduras: Spain

Diplomatic mission
- Embassy of Honduras, Madrid: Embassy of Spain, Tegucigalpa

The relationship between Honduras and Spain dates back to the Spanish colonization of the Americas. Today, both nations are members of the Association of Academies of the Spanish Language and the Organization of Ibero-American States.

== History ==
=== Spanish colonization ===
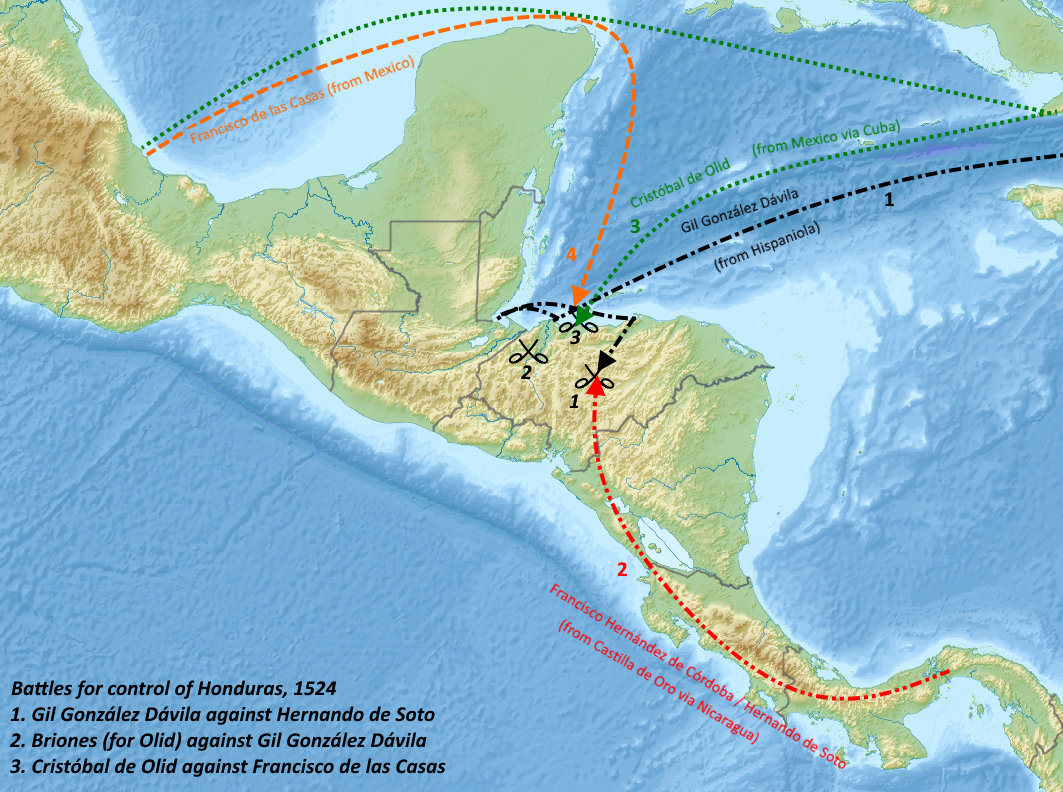
Map of Spanish expeditions to conquer Honduras

In September 1502, explorer Christopher Columbus arrived to northern Honduras on his fourth voyage to the Americas. In 1524, Spanish conquistador Gil González Dávila, on his way to Nicaragua, was set off course by a storm and landed in present-day Honduras. Upon arrival to the Honduran coast, in order to lighten the load of his ships so that he can arrive to land, he ordered several horses to be thrown overboard into the ocean and by that action, the newly established port was called Puerto de Caballos (Port of Horses). Gil González Dávila went on to found the first Spanish settlement in Honduras called San Gil de Buena Vista.

Initial conquest of Honduras proved to be difficult as the native tribes in the territory overwhelmingly resisted the Spanish invasion. Impatient of the prolonged conquest of the territory, Spanish conquistador of the Aztecs in present-day Mexico, Hernán Cortés came to Honduras with an army to take control of the territory. It was not until 1539 that Spanish forces were able to take full control of the territory. The territory of Honduras soon officially became part of the Spanish Empire under the Viceroy of New Spain based in Mexico City and administered by the Captaincy General of Guatemala based in Santiago de Guatemala.

=== Independence ===
In 1808, Joseph Bonaparte was installed as King of Spain and several Spanish American colonies began to declare their independence from Spain. As Honduras and most Central American nations were governed by Mexico City; New Spain declared its independence from Spain in 1810. In 1821, the Plan of Iguala declared Mexico as a constitutional monarchy. Honduras declared its own independence from Spain on 15 September 1821 and chose to join the Mexican Empire under Emperor Agustín de Iturbide.

In March 1823, Iturbide resigned as Emperor and Mexico became a republic. Honduras decided to separate from Mexico on 1 July 1823. Honduras, along with Costa Rica, El Salvador, Guatemala and Nicaragua formed the Federal Republic of Central America. In 1839 the Central American Federation dissolved and Honduras became an independent nation.

=== Post-Independence ===
On 17 November 1894, Honduras and Spain established diplomatic relations with the signing of a Treaty of Peace and Friendship. After independence a small community of Catalans immigrated to Honduras. In September 1977, King Juan Carlos I of Spain made his first and only official visit to Honduras.

In June 2009, Honduran President Manuel Zelaya was removed by military forces and forced into exile. As a result of the coup d'état, Spain expelled the Honduran ambassador in Madrid who supported the removal of President Zelaya from power. Over the years, several thousands Hondurans have immigrated to Spain seeking better opportunities. The largest Honduran community in Spain (and in all of Europe) is located in the town of Girona, Catalonia province.

Spanish prime minister Pedro Sánchez visited Honduras in August 2022, meeting with Honduran president Xiomara Castro. They vowed to deepen the economic and trade relations, also signing a memorandum of understanding pertaining the strengthening of cooperation in the healthcare sector.

== High-level visits ==
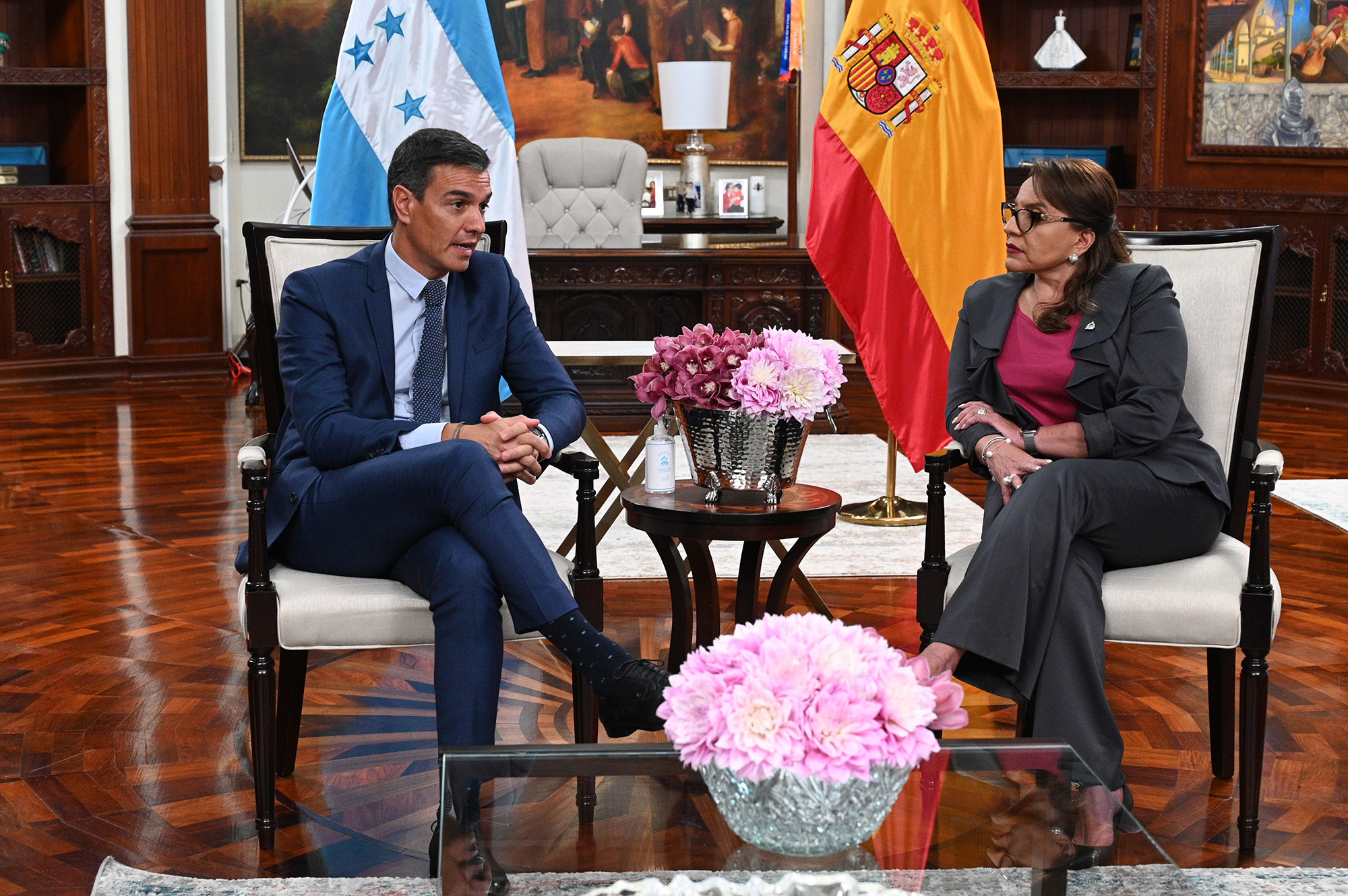
Spanish Prime Minister Pedro Sánchez visiting with Honduran President Xiomara Castro in Tegucigalpa; August 2022.

Presidential visits from Honduras to Spain

- President José Azcona del Hoyo (1989)
- President Rafael Leonardo Callejas Romero (1992)
- President Ricardo Maduro (2003, 2004, 2005)
- President Manuel Zelaya (2006, 2007, 2008)
- President Porfirio Lobo Sosa (2010, 2011, 2012)
- President Juan Orlando Hernández (2014, 2019)
- President Xiomara Castro (2023, 2025)
- President Nasry Asfura (2026)

Royal and Prime Ministerial visits from Spain to Honduras

- King Juan Carlos I (1977)
- Prime Minister Felipe González (1995)
- Prime Minister José María Aznar (1999)
- Crowned Prince Felipe (2006, 2012)
- King Felipe VI (2022)
- Prime Minister Pedro Sánchez (2022)

== Bilateral relations ==
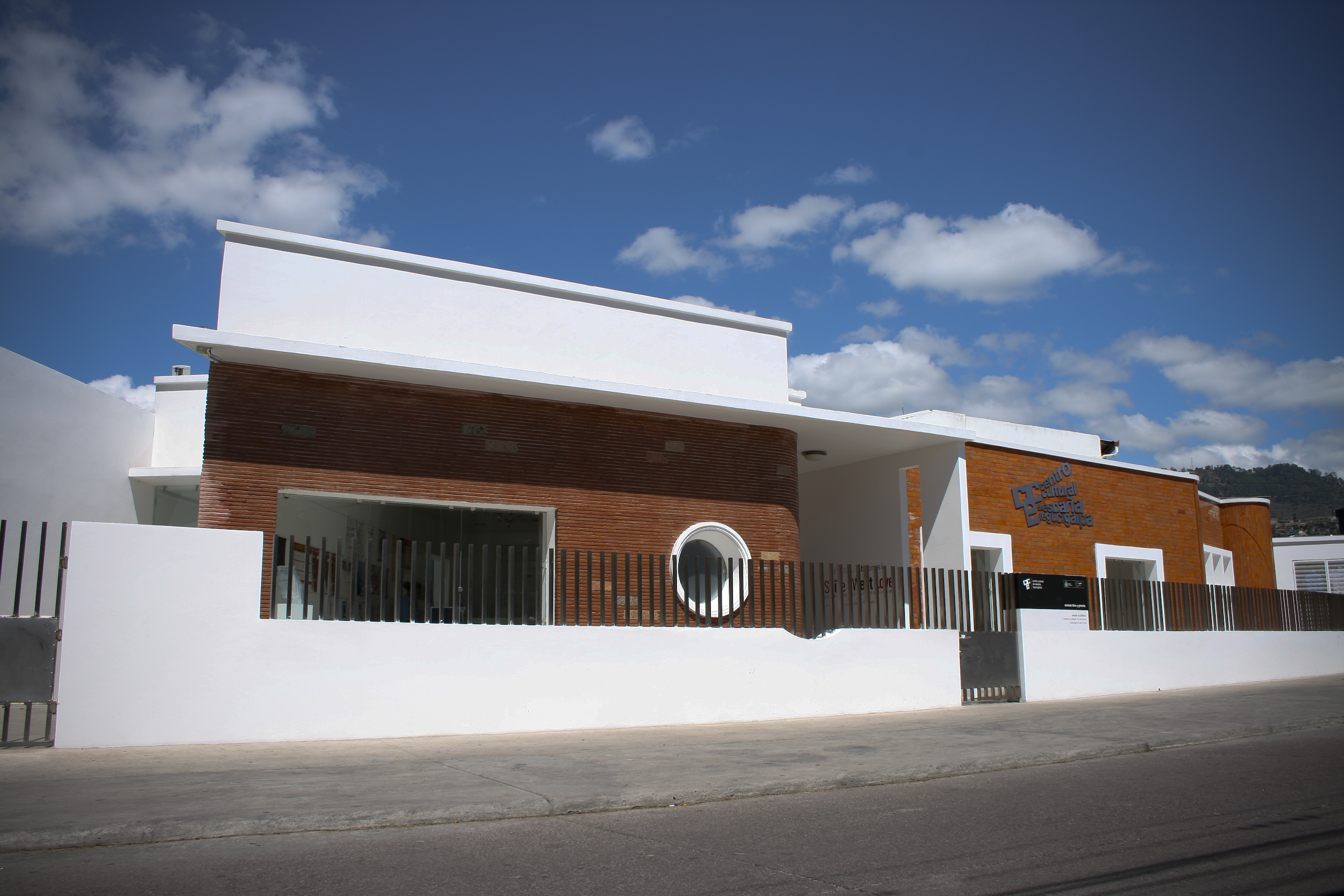
Spanish Cultural Center in Tegucigalpa

Both nations have signed several bilateral agreements such as an Agreement on Dual-Nationality (1966); Agreement on Economic Cooperation (1972); Agreement on Scientific and Technical Cooperation (1981); Agreement on Air Transportation (1992); Agreement on the reciprocal Promotion and Protection of Investments (1994); Agreement on Cultural, Educational and Scientific Cooperation (1994); Agreement on mutual Diplomatic Assistance (1995) and an Extradition Treaty (1999).

== Transportation ==
There are direct flight between both nations with Air Europa and Iberojet.

== Trade ==
In 2023, trade between Honduras and Spain totaled $258 million dollars. Honduras main exports to Spain include: fish, mussels, crustacean and coffee. Spain's main exports to Honduras include: raw materials, industrial products and material used for the mechanical and construction industry (mainly steel products) and the pharma-chemical industry. In 2016, Spanish investments in Honduras totaled €4.8 million Euros. Spanish multinational companies such as Mapfre and Zara operate in Honduras.

== Resident diplomatic missions ==
of Honduras in Spain

- Madrid (Embassy)
- Madrid (Consulate)
- Barcelona (Consulate-General)
- Bilbao (Consulate-General)
- Valencia (Consulate-General)
- Girona (Vice Consulate)

of Spain in Honduras

- Tegucigalpa (Embassy)

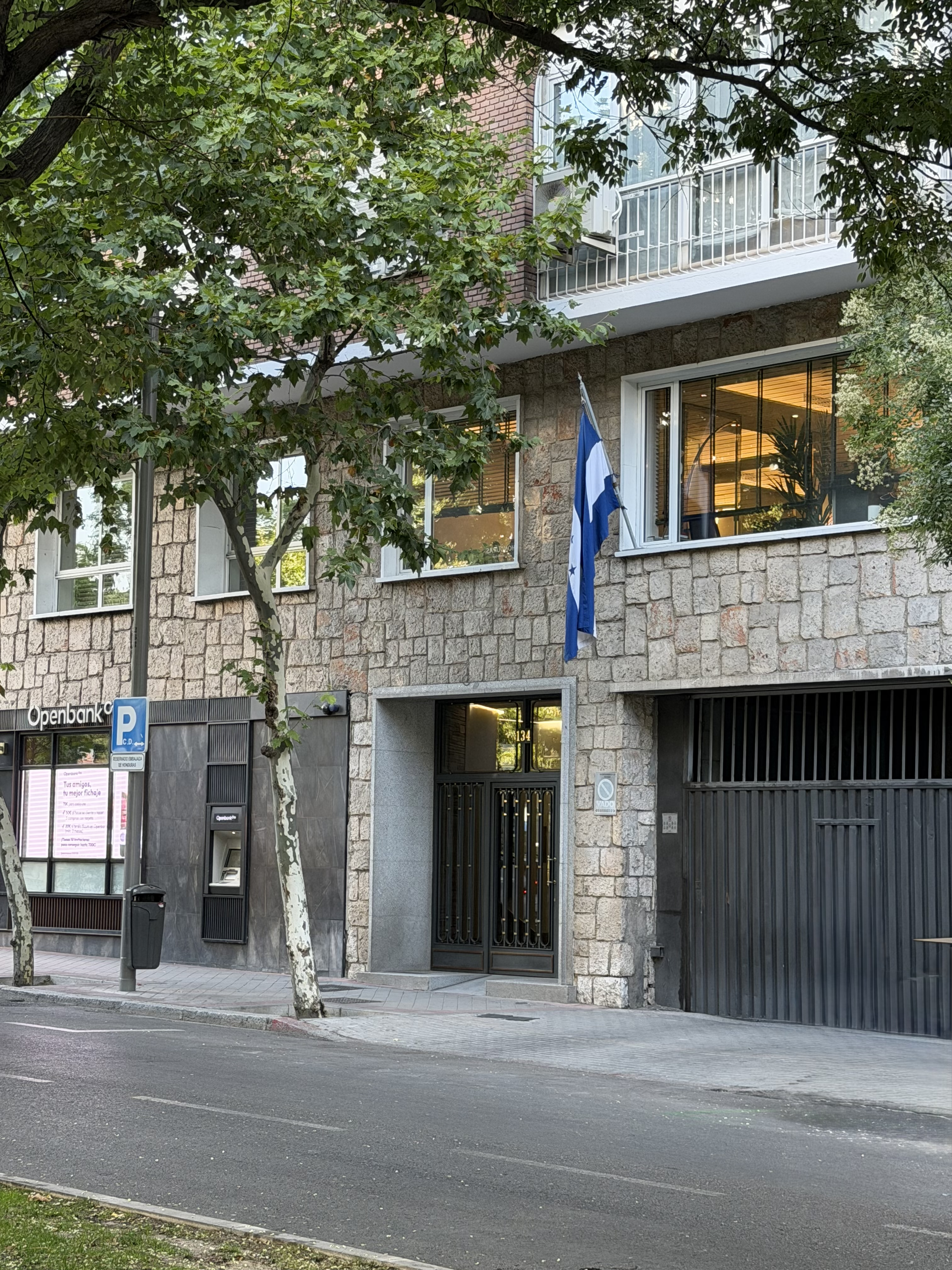
Embassy of Honduras in Madrid

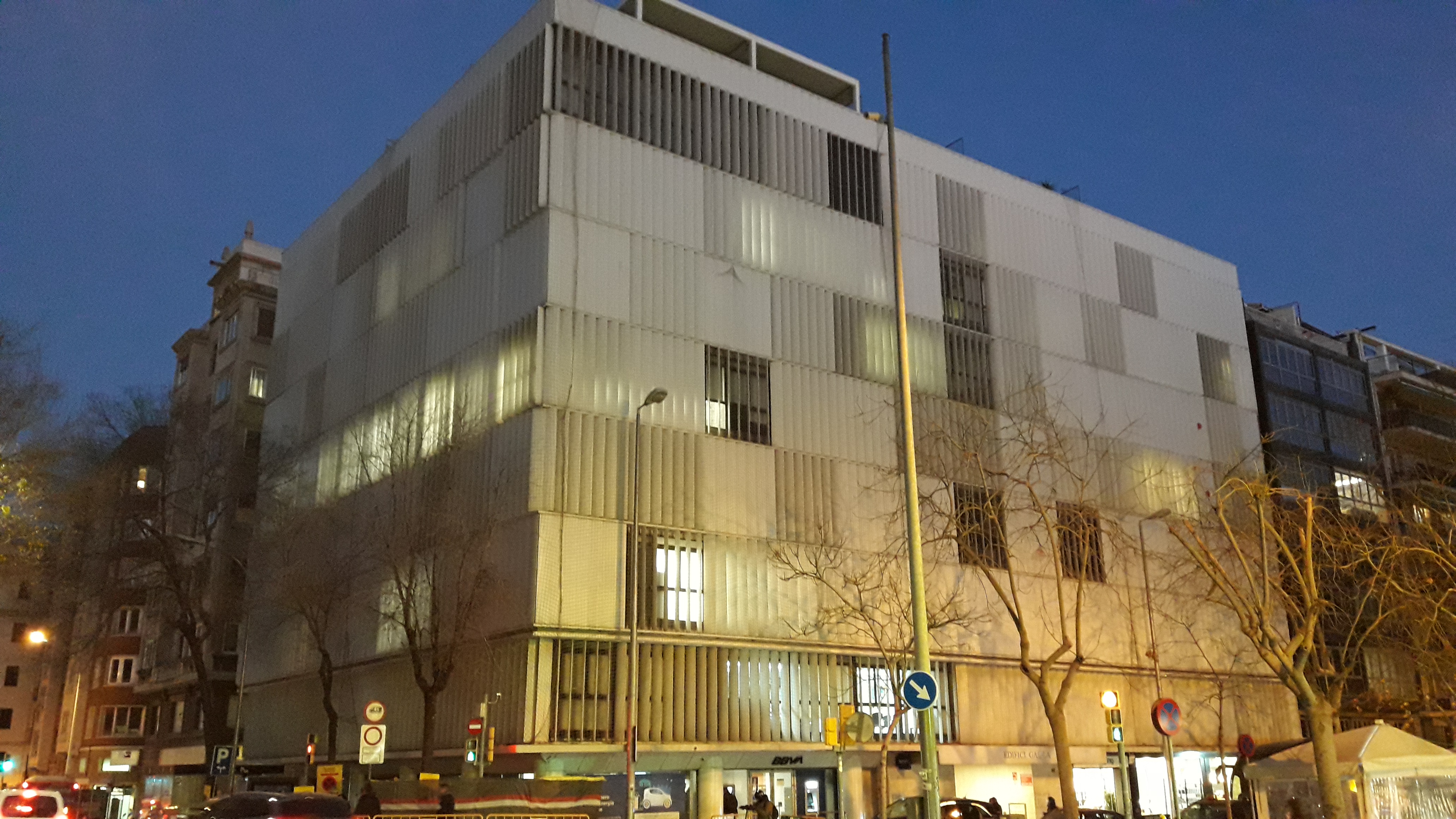
Building hosting the Consulate-General of Honduras in Barcelona

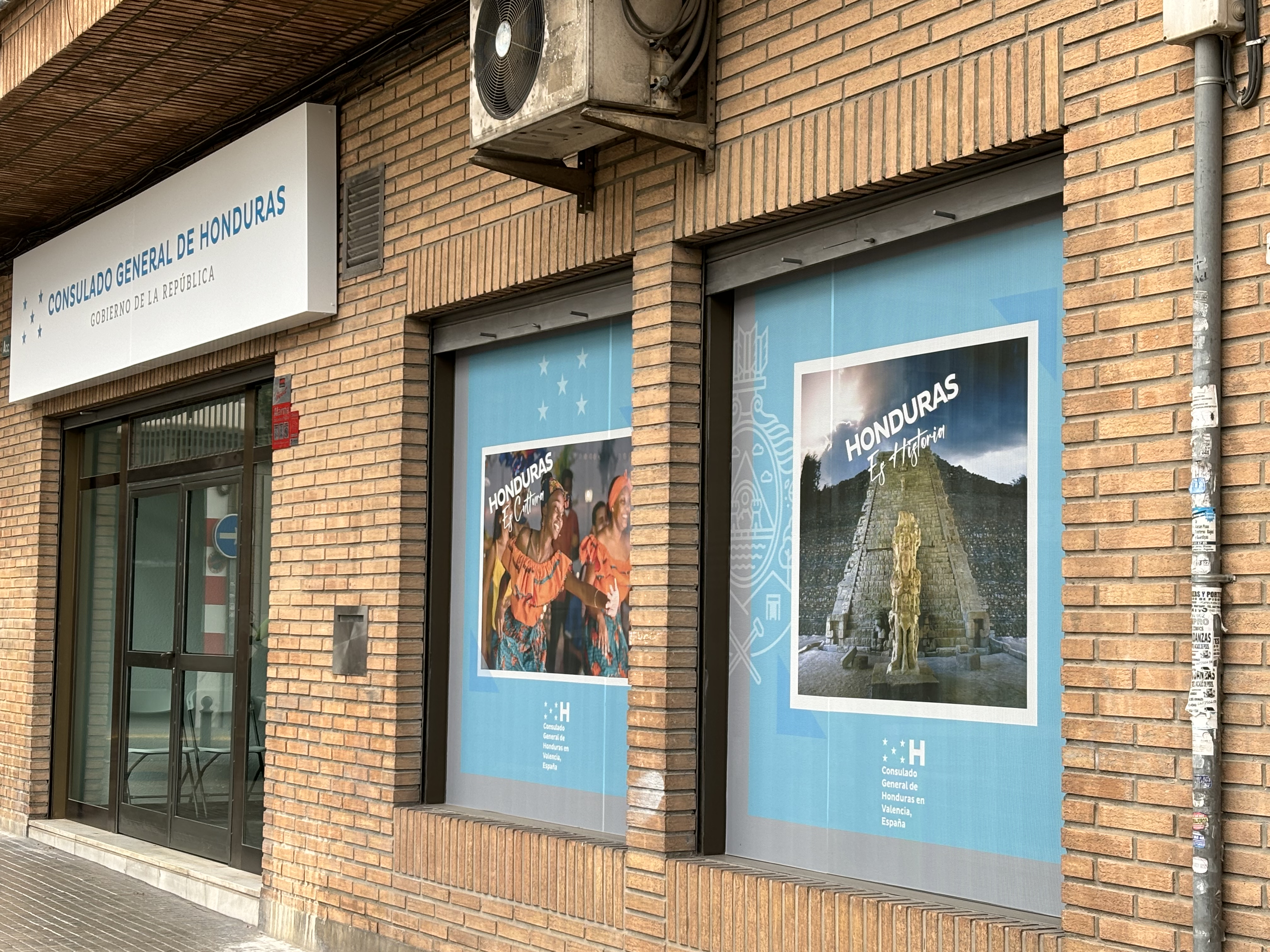
Consulate-General of Honduras in Valencia

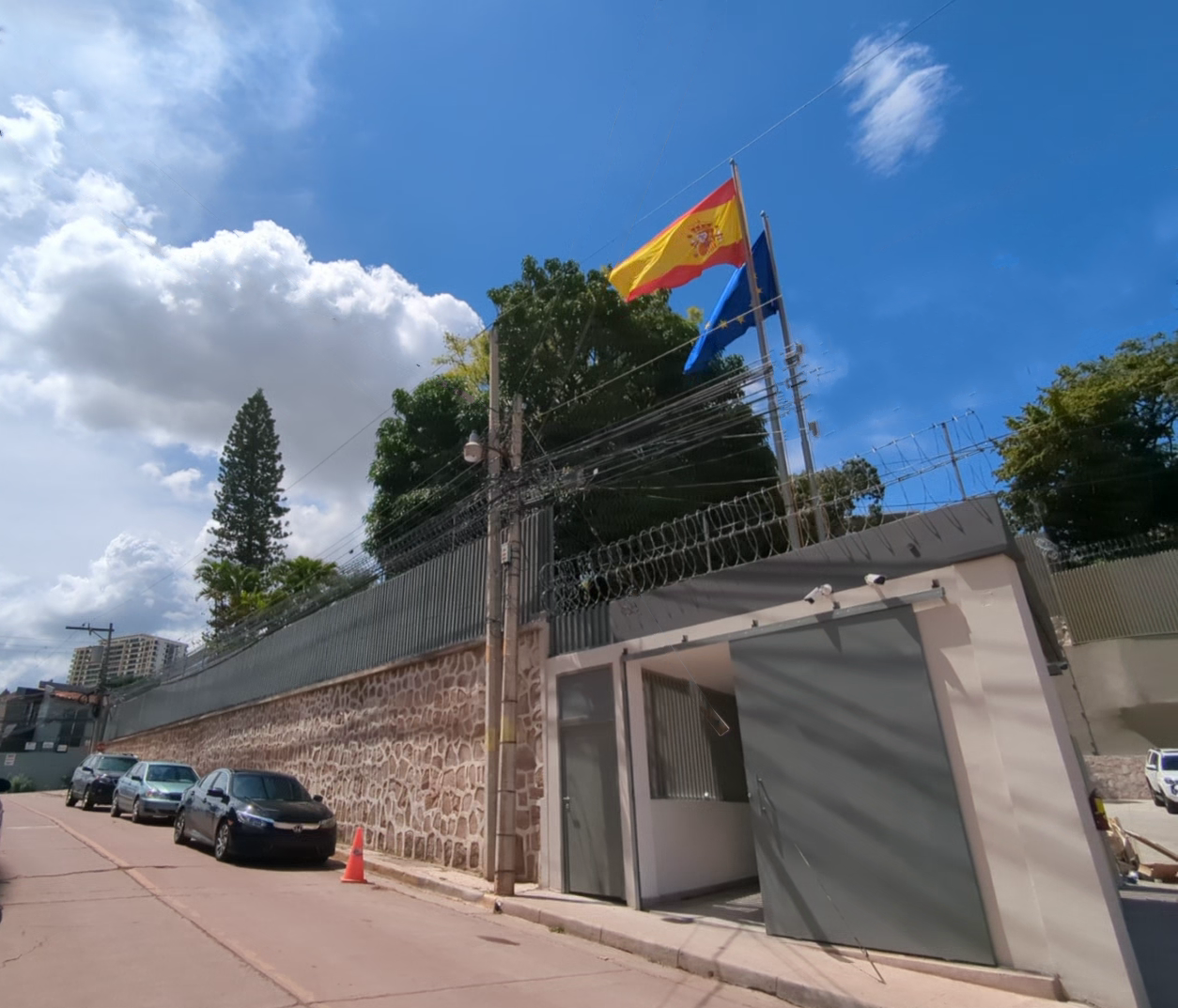
Embassy of Spain in Tegucigalpa

== See also ==
- Foreign relations of Honduras
- Foreign relations of Spain
- Honduran migration to Spain
- Spanish migration to Honduras
