= Ricardo Jaar =

Honduran academic and businessman

- Born: Ricardo J. Jaar; San Pedro Sula, Honduras
- Education: The George Washington University (B.S.); American University (M.A.)
- Occupations: Executive President, USAP
- Board member of: USAP (1996–present); Campus Tv (2008–present)

Ricardo Jorge Jaar is a Honduran academic and businessman, known for his contributions in higher education and corporate social responsibility. He was born in San Pedro Sula, Honduras.

== Biography ==
He is the son of Jorge E. Jaar Q.D.D.G., and Elena J Larach de Jaar. He has two sisters and three brothers.

In February 1991, Jaar received a Bachelor of Science Degree in Systems Analysis and Engineering from The George Washington University, Washington, DC, and in May 1993, he received a Master of Arts Degree in Applied Economics at The American University, Washington, DC.

== Academic career ==
In 1994 after graduating from The American University, Washington DC., In 1995, Ricardo J. Jaar returned to his home in San Pedro Sula, Honduras and became a professor at Universidad de San Pedro Sula (USAP), the first private university in Honduras. His teaching responsibilities included a wide range of subjects from economics to operations research. He became a member of the Board of Directors of this institution and eventually becoming the Director of that Board, Executive President of the university, USAP, under his leadership, in 2023, was awarded the distinguished the Lifelong Learning University® seal in the SILVER category, a distinction granted by the renowned Lifelong Learning Foundation. Building upon this achievement, in 2024, USAP was further elevated to the Gold Lifelong Learning University® Seal, solidifying its position as a leader in promoting lifelong learning and fostering opportunities for students and professionals alike. Furthermore, the Executive President, Ricardo J. Jaar, received the Lifelong Learning Leader Seal in recognition of his leadership and commitment to lifelong learning and the desire to make a tangible difference in the education of our future generations and President of Campus Television, the first HD TV station in the country;. In 2004, Ricardo J. Jaar founded Fundacion Educar, a non-profit organization dedicated to improving the quality of education in Honduras through innovative programs and initiatives to empower Honduran youth through access to quality education and opportunities for personal and professional growth. Jaar was part of the organization committee of the XXVII Model OAS General Assembly (MOAS) celebrated in San Pedro Sula, Honduras 27–30 April 2009 and has successfully organized presidential debates in Honduras for the past 3 presidential elections ., and has organized for several years, along with the US Embassy in Honduras and Fundacion Covelo, the program " Sueño Hondureño" to encourage students from public schools to form their own micro-enterprises and provides real-world business experience

In 2024, under Jaar's leadership, USAP established a significant partnership with Arizona State University (ASU) and Cintana Education to offer a unique educational model in Honduras, providing students with new global academic opportunities. This Partnership provides students and faculty with access to global signature courses, English programs, innovation certificates, master classes, and international mobility opportunities, integrating world-class resources and fostering global education standards

In recognition of its commitment to sustainability, the Municipality of San Pedro Sula awarded USAP the Sello Verde in 2024, honoring the institution’s exemplary practices in environmental stewardship and social responsibility. This distinction was reaffirmed in 2025, reflecting the continuity and consolidation of USAP’s sustainability efforts and institutional responsibility.

== Awards and honors ==
Dean's Commendation List at The George Washington University, Washington, D.C. Ricardo J. Jaar has also received numerous awards for his efforts in the education field, among them: Galardón La Concordia, given by The German Technical Cooperation (GTZ), and COHEP the Honduran National Business Council, for best practices in Social responsibility. in 2008 Consejo Iberoamericano en Honor a la Calidad Educativa awarded Mr. Jaar the Title Honoris Causa de Iberoamerica and the Honorific Title of Master en Gestión Educativa de Iberoamérica

== Other activity ==
Other positions held by Mr. Jaar in the Honduran community are: President of the Board of Directors of INTERLEASE S.A. de C.V. iMotors Distribuidor de Maxus y Qingling Motors (Subsidiary of ISUZU Motors Japan) (Commercial Vehicles Dealership and leasing company) and a Founder/Counselor to the Board of Directors of Fundación Hondureña de Responsabilidad Social Empresarial (FUNDAHRSE). Under his leadership at both, iMotors and USAP, he spearheaded the introduction of the nation's first electric vehicle (EV) fleet and developed the inaugural "Certificate in Electromobility" program in Honduras.
