= Immigration to Honduras =

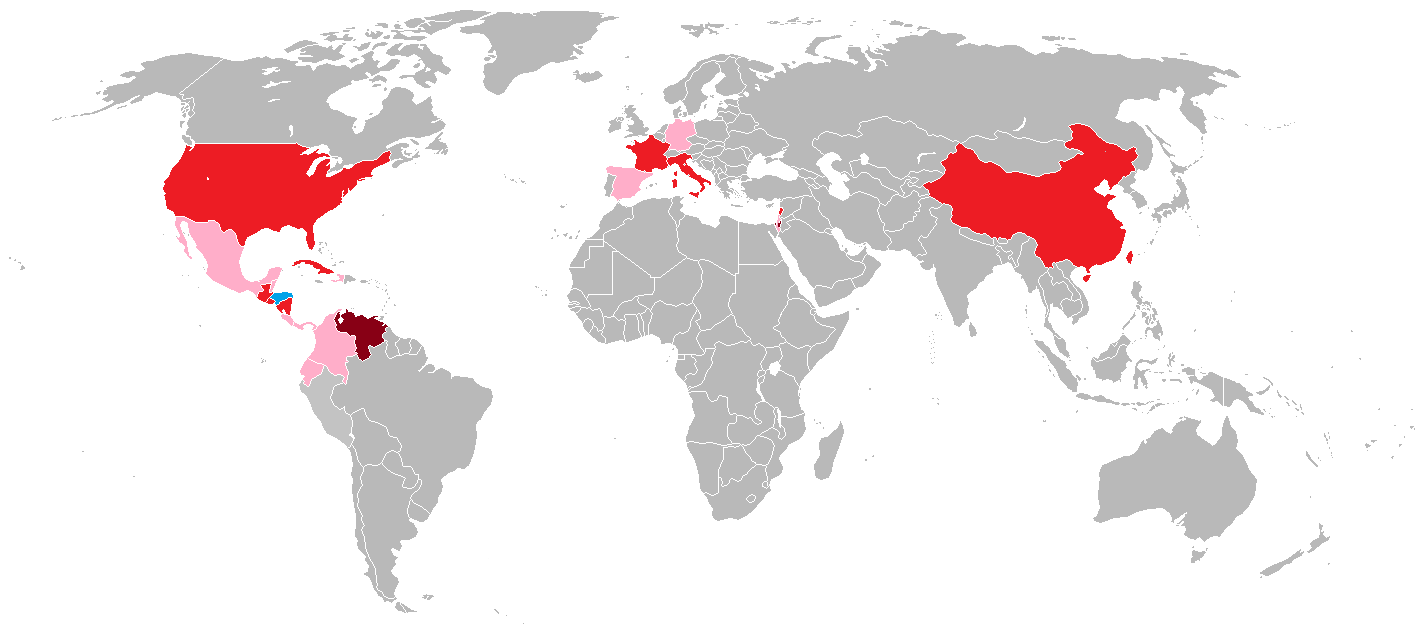
Countries where the largest migratory groups in Honduras come in 2023.

Immigration to the Republic of Honduras is a complex demographic phenomenon that has been an important source of population growth and cultural change through the centuries throughout much of Honduran history. In the ten months to October 2022, about 120,000 migrants passed through Honduras, most of them being irregular.

== History ==
=== Colonial period ===
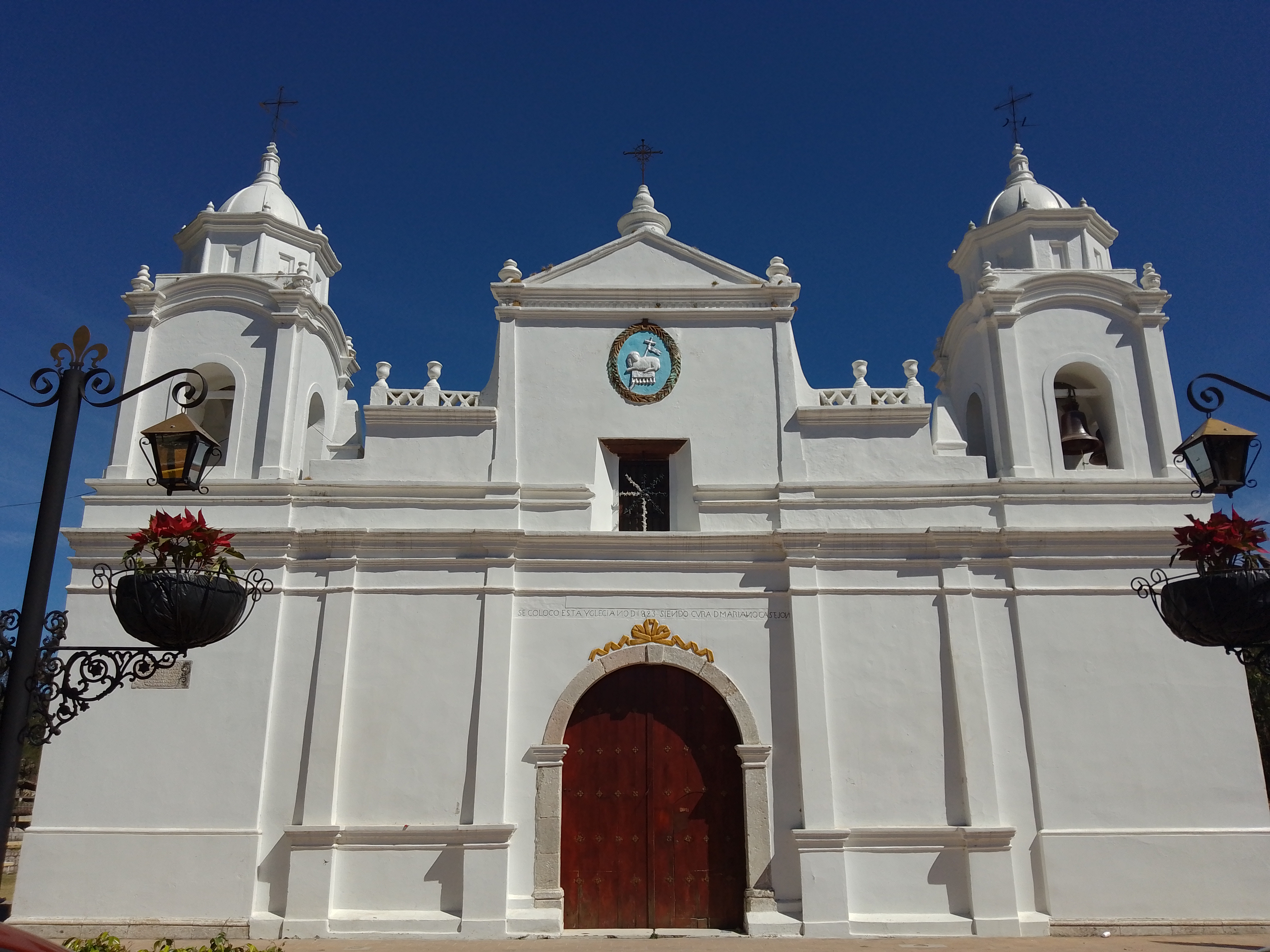
Ojojona, a colonial town founded by Spanish conquistadors.

The history of immigration in Honduras is given as a continuation of the Spanish colonization of the American continent. Each period brought different national and ethnic groups from the Iberian peninsula. The first Spaniards who arrived and settle in Honduran soil where Extremadurans and Andalucians. On the later fifteenth century more Spanish arrived to New Spain, followed by Africans, most of them slaves. In 1797 the Garifunas were expelled by the English from the island of San Vicente, to the nearby islands from Roatán and Trujillo.

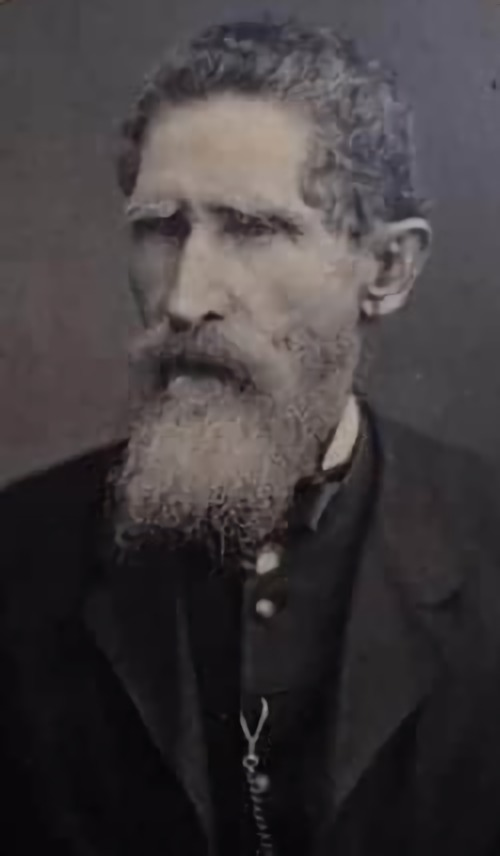
General Florencio Xatruch, son of a Spanish-Catalonian immigrant.

In the fifteenth century, Spanish citizens declared themselves in favor of moving to new lands to colonize them; then during the reign of Carlos of Spain and V of the Holy Roman Empire ordered the Organization of the Hispanic Monarchy in 1522 and two years later (1524) the Council of the Indies was founded and it was also during his reign that his territories were extended in America, Honduras (Hibueras or Comayagua) in those times was one more property of the Spanish Monarchy. In the same way, as so many Spaniards arrived, so did the French, English, Italians, Germans, etc.

=== Republican era ===
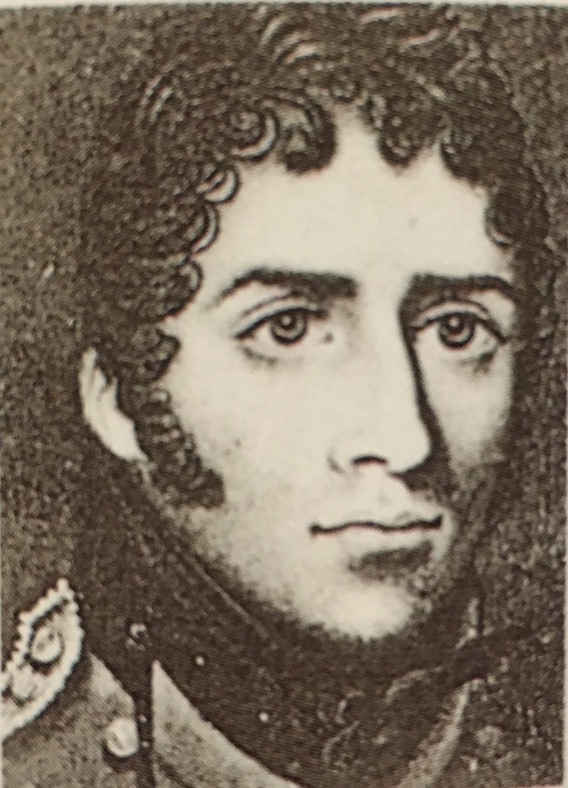
Juan Galindo, Irish-Honduran Military officer and Archeologist.

Honduras obtains independence from the Spanish Empire in 1821, and from the first Mexican empire in 1823, forming part of the Central American Federation. Honduras would finally separate from this Union in 1838, beginning its history as an independent nation. During this decade the greatest migration would be Spaniards, mainly from Catalonia.

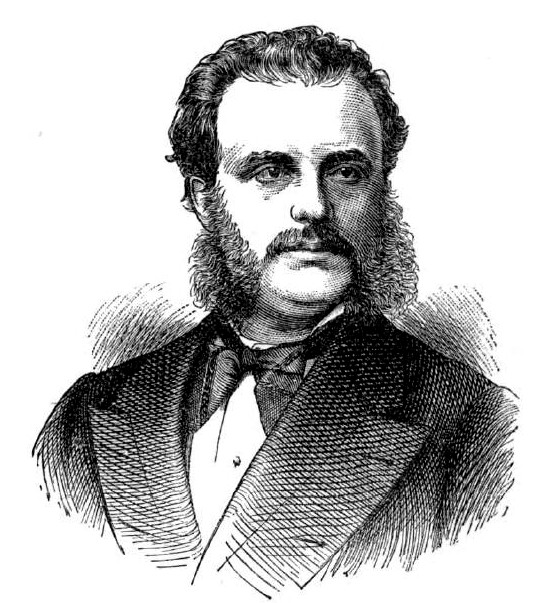
President Marco aurelio Soto, the man who promoted economic liberalism in Honduras and attracted hundreds of thousands of immigrants to Honduran soil

In 1875 the so-called liberal reform would take place at the hands of the liberal president Dr. Marco Aurelio Soto. It would assist and initiate the flooding of waves of immigrants from Europe, the Middle East, and East Asia. This was under the excuse to increase the Honduran Economy and taking immigration policies similar to the US ones.

Later, during the government of General Luis Bográn, a descendant of French immigrants, a great importance was given to immigration so that it populates the national territory and promotes both work and the exploitation of natural resources, what Honduras offered to foreigners was equal treatment. cordial, security and above all hand over the Honduran nationality. At the end of the 19th century, the presence of US companies in Honduras was already making itself felt, so during the late 19th century and early 20th century, there was a steady stream of American migration for various reasons. Some were to work as officials in fruit or mining companies, as salaried workers, or for mere exoticism since the Honduran coast has always been a tourist attraction.

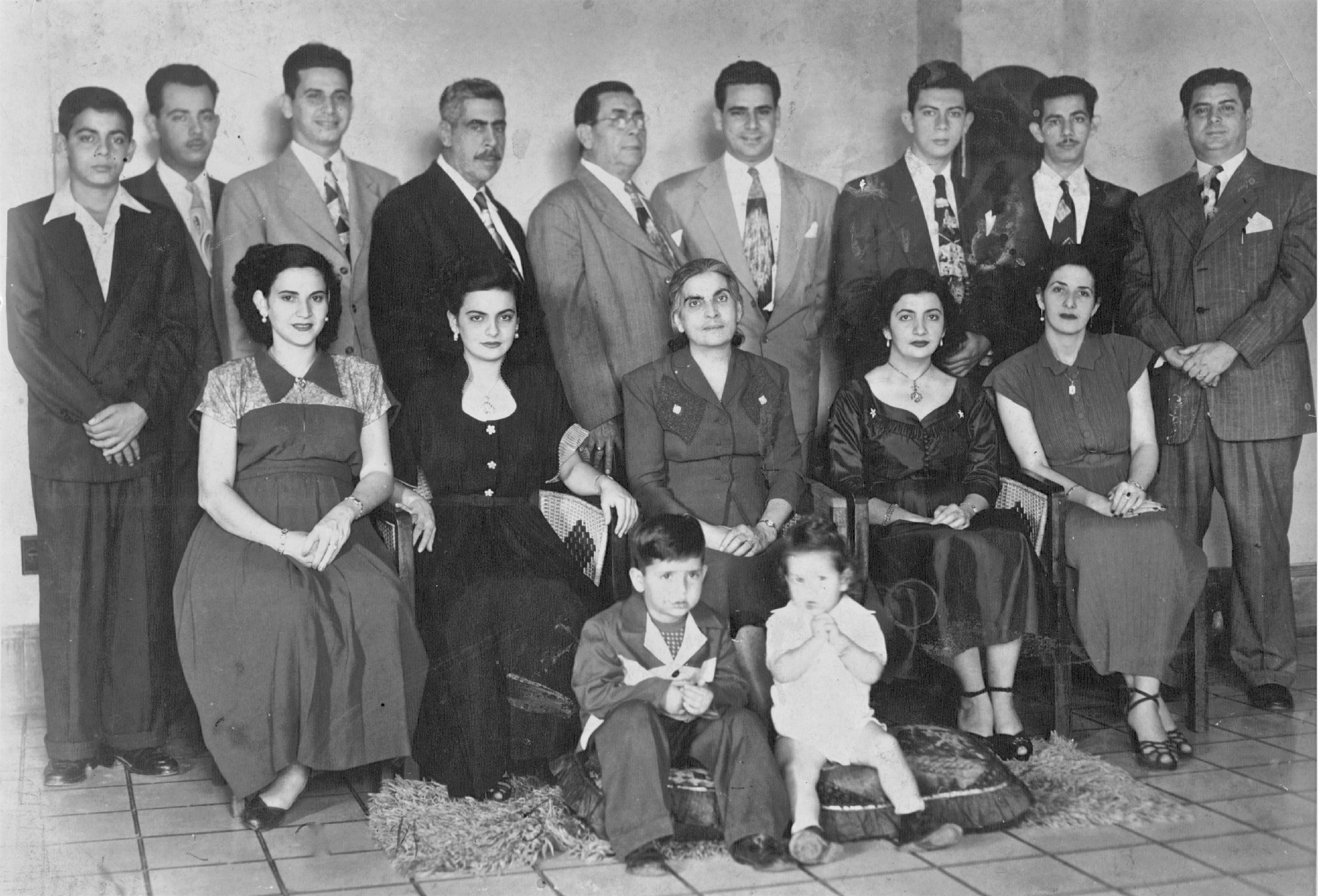
The Kafie family, one of the most notable Palestinian-Hondurans

By the 1930s, the Arab community was the strongest economically immigrant group due to the undertakings of various textile or coffee businesses. Sinmarbergo in the 40s the German community in Honduras suffered a lot because at that time Honduras had entered the conflict in 1941, which caused the expropriation of German businesses throughout the country. However, from the 50s onwards, Honduras would again maintain bilateral relations with Germany.

During the 1960s, a good portion of the Honduran population were Salvadoran immigrants and their children who, due to the limited space in El Salvador, sought to continue farming in Honduras. However, it was for this reason that the government of Oswaldo Lopez Arellano used them as a scapegoat for the economic downturn that Honduras experienced in the late 60s. This provoked the 100-day war in which several Salvadoran families were forcibly displaced from the country. However, Honduras and El Salvador would once again have agreements where the latter would accept open borders with its neighboring nation. The internal migration of Central Americans would continue to be seen as a result of the Cold War due to the conflict called The Central American crisis, being the largest group of these Nicaraguans.

=== Modern day ===
Honduras currently receives many irregular immigrants to its territory since it is located in the southern isthmus of North America, many of them seek to go to the United States or Canada. In 2013, the census of foreigners in Honduran was 29,000 people. However, this statistics would drastically change at the end of the 2010s, given that in 2022 nearly 178,300 immigrants were registered in its territory.

By 2023, the amount of irregular immigrants in Honduras more than tripled, with over 416,000 arrivals reported by October. Primarily coming from countries like Venezuela, Haiti, Cuba and Ecuador, most of these migrants use Honduras as a transit point to get to the United States.

== Demography ==
Below is a table that adds the total number of both regular and irregular immigrants together with the estimated number of their descendants who have been living on Honduran soil for at least two generations by nationality. However, the figures may change since in the case of irregular immigrants such as Venezuelans, Haitians, and Cubans, they do not stay long in the country, since they seek to move to other destinations and their number varies by season. The sum of the statistics for 2022 indicates the followingː

Country	Number of Immigrants (2022)
Palestine	280,000
Venezuela	44,000
United States	21,908
Lebanon	20,000
Italy	14,166
Cuba	14,687
El Salvador	8,995
Nicaragua	7,891
China	7,300
France	5,953
Guatemala	4,681
Haiti	3,500
Spain	3,421
Mexico	1.592
Colombia	881
Costa Rica	874
Ecuador	468
Panama	404
Peru	390
Israel	390
Belize	370
Japan	163

== Groups ==
Many people emigrated to Honduras for various reasons over the centuries. Much of the immigrants who arrived in Honduras after the liberal reform mixed with the mostly Mestizo Honduran population.

=== Europeans ===
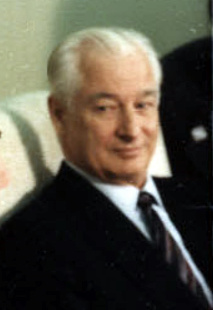
Jose Simon Azcona, ex-president of Honduras, son of Spanish immigrants.

The Spanish settlers were the first European immigrants to arrive in Honduras, after the discovery of America, when the colony of the Spanish monarchy was established in the new continent. With the passage of time, the citizens who came to what is currently the Republic of Honduras were of more nationalities, many of them French, Italian, British, and German.

==== Jewish ====
A large proportion of European immigrants to Honduras were Ashkenazi Jews fleeing antisemitism in Europe, mostly coming from the German Empire, Austria-Hungary, and the Russian Empire.

=== Arabs ===
Arab immigration in Honduras begins to be noticed in the 19th century, but it became more frequent in the first decade of the 20th century, due to the crisis of the Ottoman Empire and then the First World War.

Since the beginning of the 20th century, Arabs have been a force in the Honduran economy and politics. Currently the strongest community is the Palestinian one, with more than 280,000 descendants and 20,000 Lebanese, they represent three percent of the population of a country and lead the economy in the country. They are the second concentration of Palestinians in the American continent, only Chile has a larger Palestinian population than Honduras.

=== East Asians ===
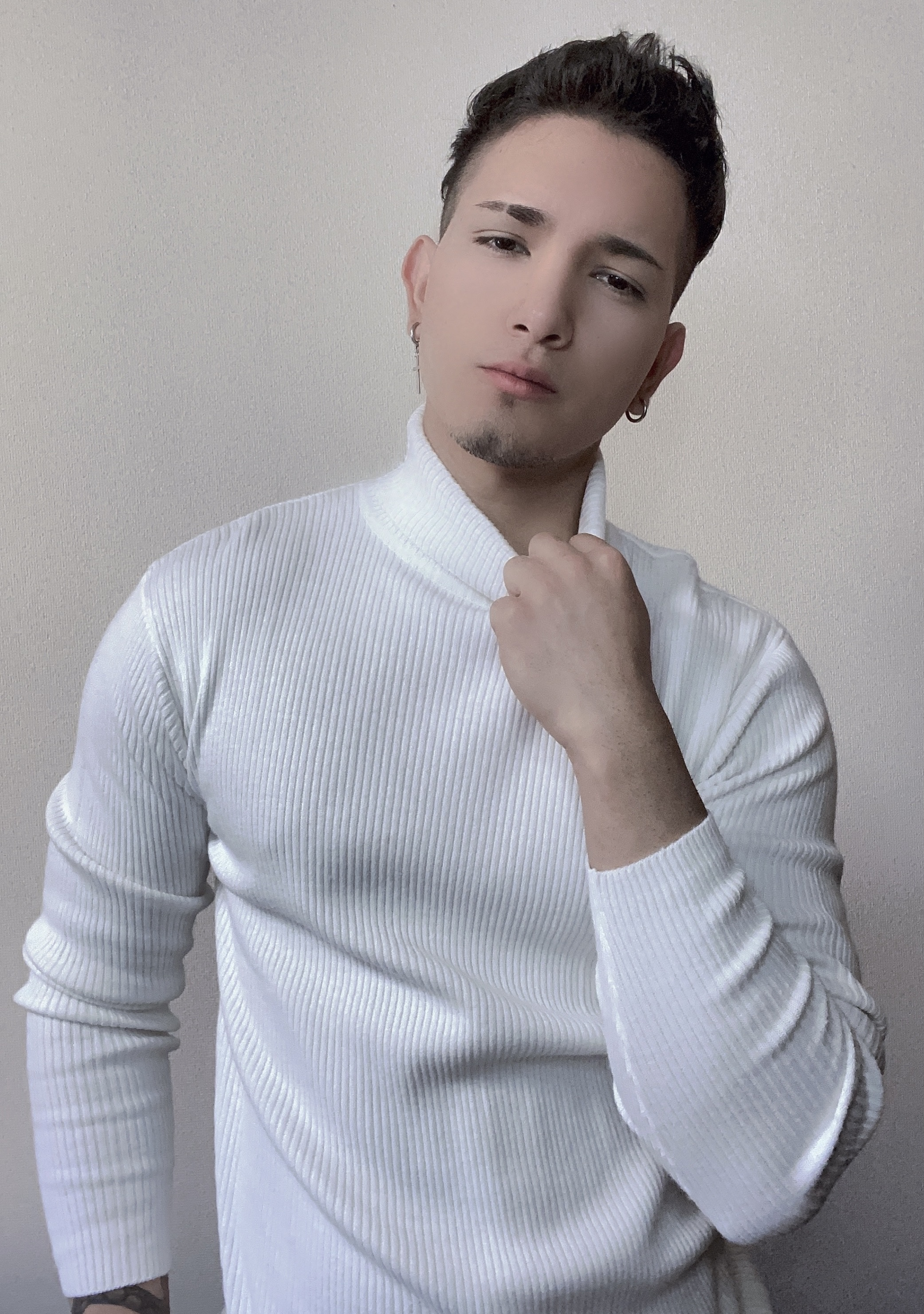
Hajime Waki, Japanese-Honduran singer

In 1886 the United States issued an order for the expulsion of Chinese from states including California, Washington, Oregon and Alaska, due to racist riots and the payment of a tax for each Chinese over 18 years of age. Chinese immigration sought refuge by spreading out among the former colonies of the Spanish Empire, from Mexico to South America, Honduras being an attractive destination for Chinese people at the end of the 19th centrury opening many businesses such as stores, hotels, and restaurants.

Honduras has also smaller east Asian communities formed through diplomatic relations, technical cooperation, companies, and individuals who ended up settling there after arriving for work or projects being one of the most notorious the Japanese-Hondurans; at least 163 Japanese people have Honduran nationality.

=== Americans ===
==== Central Americans ====
Central Americans are the largest group of immigrants to Honduras. The majority, mostly Salvadorans, migrate for labor reasons. Currently there are around 23,395 Central Americans of Honduran nationality from all the countries that make up the region.

==== North Americans ====
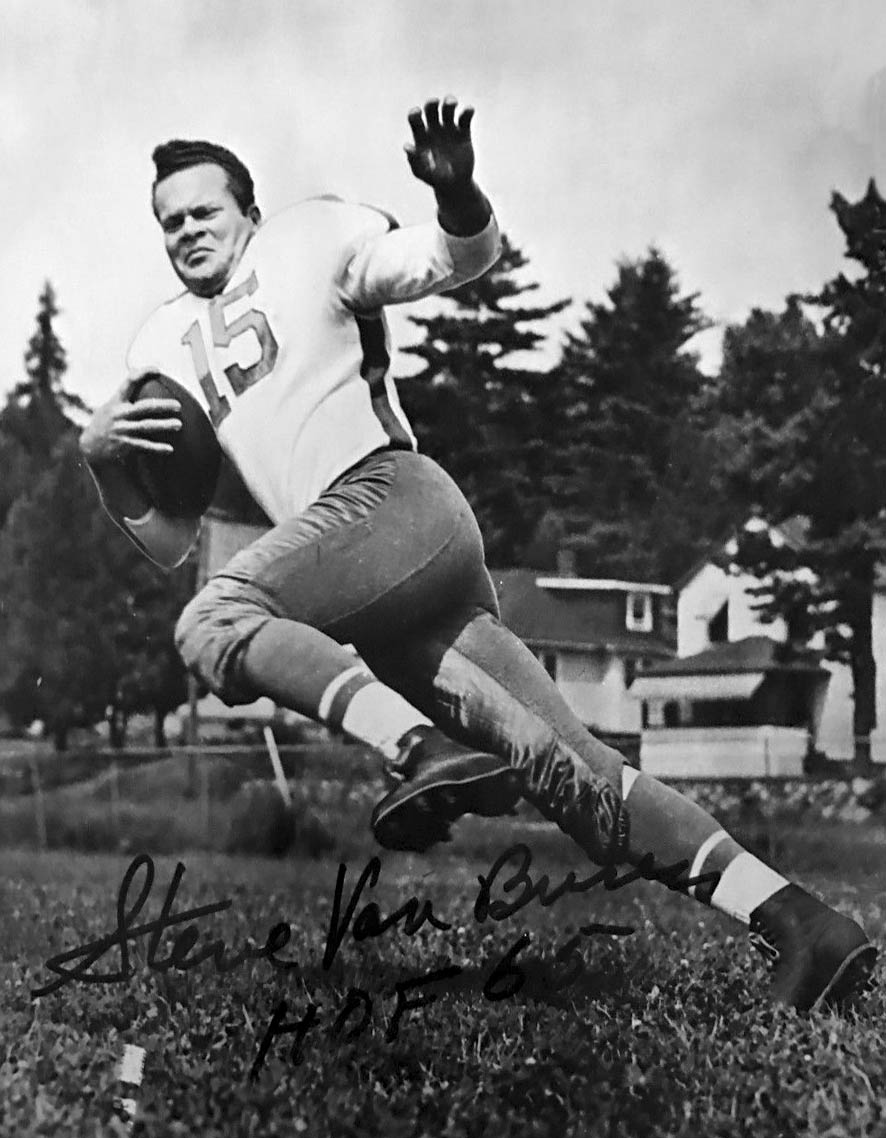
Steve Van Buren, NFL player of American and Honduran Roots, who played for the Philadelphia Eagles. He was born in La Ceiba.

Immigration of American citizens from the US to the Republic of Honduras, the first great migration was given by the citizens of the States declared Confederates of the South who did not recognize the Constitution or President Abraham Lincoln. for which the first wave of migration began towards the north (Canada) and west of North America, towards Mexico, the Caribbean and to a lesser extent towards Central America.

The actions of US investors in Honduras began with the Rosario Mining Company founded by the businessman Washington S. Valentine, then the Vaccaro Bros. founded the United Fruit Company, followed by the Standard Fruit Company, the US Bank J.P. Morgan in 1911 took charge of the Honduran debt contracted with the British and during the administration of Manuel Bonilla, businessman Samuel Zemurray founded the Cuyamel Fruit Company, with great benefits granted by the Honduran government. The new Honduran Immigration Laws, issued in the administration of Vicente Mejía Colindres and later that of Tiburcio Carías Andino, allowed a greater influx of American immigrants to the Central American country.

==== Mexicans ====
It could be said that the presence of original people from what is now called Mexico in Honduran dream could go back to the flows of Nahua groups that migrated to Central America. But it is estimated that the first Mexicans established on Honduran soil as immigrants dated back to colonial times. Currently there are more than 1,592 Mexicans who have obtained Honduran citizenship.

== See also ==
- History of Honduras
- Demographics of Honduras
- Immigration to Mexico
- Honduras–United States relations
- Spanish migration to Honduras
