= German Guatemalan =

Guatemalans of German Descent

German Guatemalans Deutsch-Guatemalteken Germano-Guatemalteco
- (Germany) (Guatemala)

Total population
- 500,000 (by ancestry)

Regions with significant populations
- Alta Verapaz, Quetzaltenango, and Guatemala City.

Languages
- German and Spanish.

Religion
- Jewish, Protestant, Catholic

Related ethnic groups
- Germans, Guatemalans

A German Guatemalan is a citizen of Guatemala who is of German descent. German settlers (along with settlers from Belgium) arrived in Guatemala in large numbers during the 19th and 20th centuries.

The government of Justo Rufino Barrios provided them with farmlands in the Western Highlands and Alta Verapaz and by the early 20th century many Germans were living in Guatemala City, Zacapa and Jutiapa.

Guatemala currently has a strong community of Germans who make up the majority of European immigrants in the country, and it is also the most numerous German community in all Central American countries.

In the 1940s, 8,000 German immigrants lived in Guatemala. During World War II several hundred Germans were expelled to the United States by the Guatemalan government as part of the deportation of Germans from Latin America during World War II.

== German colonization ==
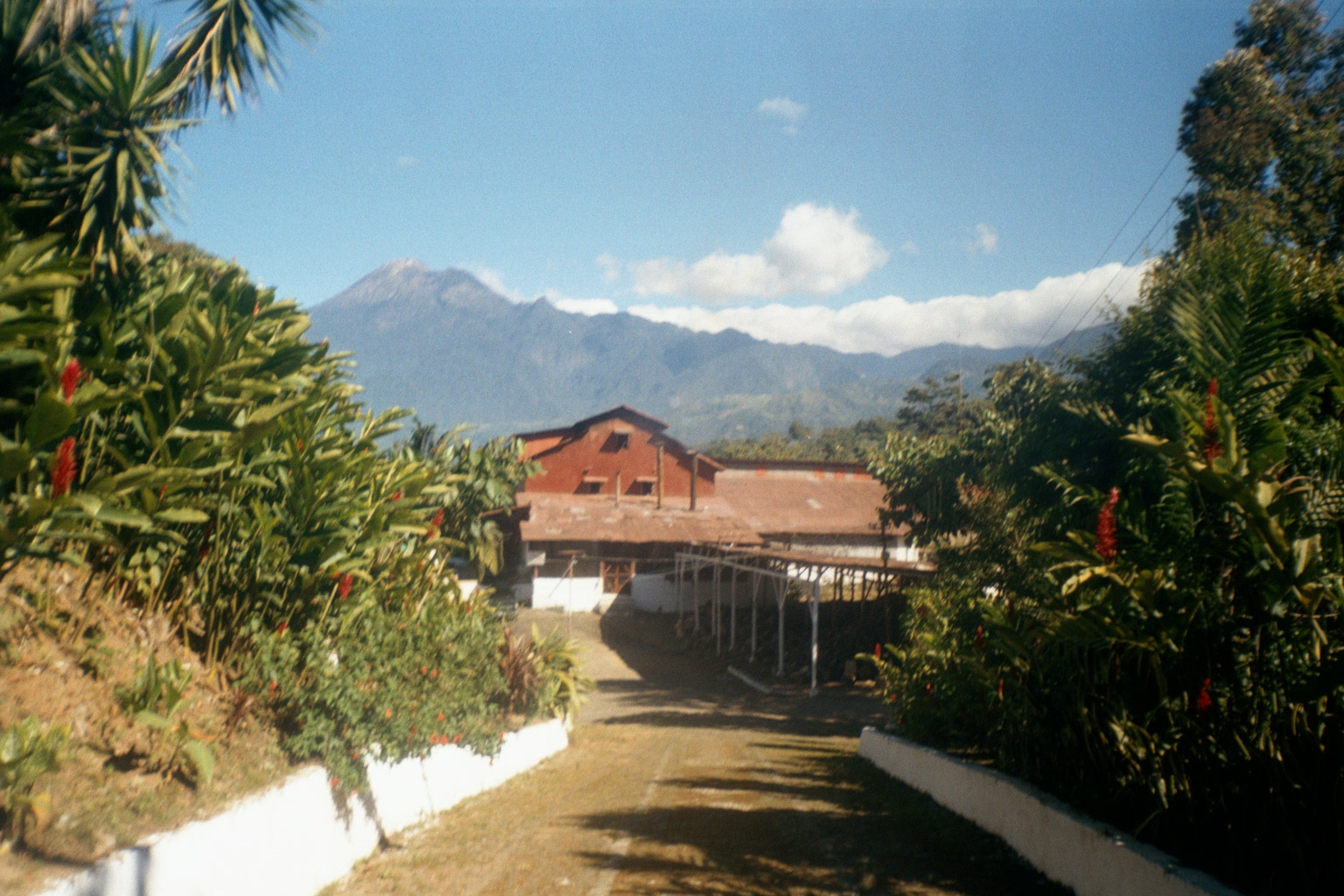
Coffee plantation estates built by the Germans

The first German colonists arrived in the mid-19th century, and soon German settlers acquired land and operated coffee plantations in Alta Verapaz and Quetzaltenango. Cobán became an important center for German settlers. Other German operations cultivated tea, cocoa, and vanilla. While most Germans went to Cobán, others went to San Juan Chamelco and Xelaju (Quetzaltenango). Cobán later came to be monopolized by German trade in wholesale stores, but they and, to a greater extent, the fincas dispersed throughout almost the entire region of Alta Verapaz. They paid workers with coins minted by each owner. These currencies could only purchase in the company store of the finca, whereby the employer obtained extra pecuniary gain.

The first German immigrant to Guatemala was Rodolfo Dieseldorff, in 1863, whereof he spoke very well of the place, and many Germans followed. According to the book The Germans in Guatemala, 1828-1944 by Regina Wagner, what attracted Germans to Verapaz was its "natural insulation, mild climate and fertile soil, and the possibilities of agricultural and commercial development." By the end of 1890, two-thirds of coffee production in that region was in hands of Germans.

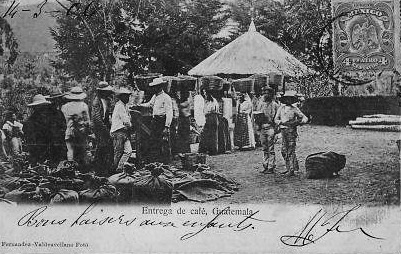
Delivery of coffee on a German farm.

With the passage of time, the economy of Alta Verapaz became entirely headed by Germans, and formed its own world in Alta Verapaz, organized in a very united and supportive community. They had social activities at the German Club, or Deutsche Verein, in Cobán, founded in 1888, later renamed the Charitable Society. Initially, this group had only German members. The Cobán German Club was improved upon, being equipped so as to lend a pleasant environment where Germans could feel at home. A library was formed with donated books and magazines brought back by those who traveled to Germany. Today it is the Charitable Society.

Dieseldorff formed a complex of farms over three periods: between 1890 and 1898 it acquired the Seacté, Chiachal, Click, SECAC-Ulpan, Santa Margarita, Paija, Panzal and El Salto farms; between 1898 and 1910 became the Raxpec, Santa Cecilia, Cubilgüitz, Chamcarel and Sacchicagua of Secol, San Diego-Yalpemech, Chichochoc, Chichaíc Santa Margarita, Rio Frio Pocola and estates; and, after 1924, it acquired the Sachamach, Tzimajil, Chiquixjí Raxahá and haciendas. At the same time, it became Dieseldorff of many indigenous plots and to fully utilize the facilities of its coffee benefit and increase the volume of its exports, buying coffee cherry to small producers in the region of San Pedro Carchá by ratings or cash advances, and also received other parchment coffee farmers as the German Brothers Sterkel, for processing into gold.

The Germans were organized in a close-knit and supportive community. In 1938, every Sunday in Coban, a group of young Germans using traditional shorts, notes the book Soul Mates, "marched in military form of Magdalena farm to the club, singing songs extolling Deutschland and its mission in the world ", which at that time included the enslavement and occupation of Eastern Europe, the sterilization of the disabled and the internment and eventual slaughter of Jews, Gypsies and homosexuals.

== Demography ==
In Guatemala, according to the embassy, there are more than 5,000 Germans living permanently in Guatemala, as well as several thousand more of German descent. This is the largest German community in Central America.

It is difficult to know exactly the number of Guatemalans of German descent, counting only in Alta Verapaz, Zacapa and Guatemala City there are a large number of descendants of German (and without other strong areas of Quetzaltenango, Baja Verapaz, El Petén, Sacatepéquez and El Progreso). It should be taken into account that in Alta Verapaz and Baja Verapaz many German settlers were mixed with indigenous Q'eqchi' women, and German settlers in the capital and eastern were mixed with mestizo or white/Spanish origin women. In conclusion, the number of Guatemalans of full German origin is very low. Currently, there are still people with German last names like Winther, Euler, Buechsel, Henstenberg, Quirin, Kouffer, Wellmann, Noack, etc.

Some Guatemalans with German ancestry speak German along with Spanish. The majority professes Protestantism or Catholicism followed by those who are Atheists, Agnostics and Jews. Many kept German traditions and holidays. The descendants of the Gregg and Dieseldorff family still have several fincas in Alta Verapaz where coffee is still grown.

=== Notable Guatemalan Germans ===
- Luis von Ahn, CEO and co-founder of Duolingo. He is of Jewish descent.
- Jacobo Arbenz, president of Guatemala (1951–1954).
- Arabella Arbenz, actress and model.
- Eduardo Suger, politician. He has German and Swiss ancestry.
- Alcina Lubitch Domecq, writer.
- Alfred Jensen, abstract painter.
- Gert Rosenthal Königsberger, politician and diplomat of German-Jewish ancestry, was foreign minister between 2006 and 2008.
- Soluna Samay, singer. She has German and Danish ancestry.
- Dieter Lehnhoff, orchestra conductor.
- Friedrich Nottebohm, subject of the Nottebohm case heard before the International Court of Justice.
- Fritz García Gallont, mayor of Guatemala City (2000–2004). He has a German and Swiss ancestry.
- Álvaro Arzú, former president of Guatemala (1996–2000), mayor of Guatemala City (2004–2018). He had German and Spanish ancestry.
- Otto Langmann, Nazi evangelical pastor, was coming from Germany but was nationalized Guatemalan, and then Uruguayan.
- Efrain Recinos, architect, muralist, urbanist, painter and sculptor.

=== German missionaries in Guatemala ===
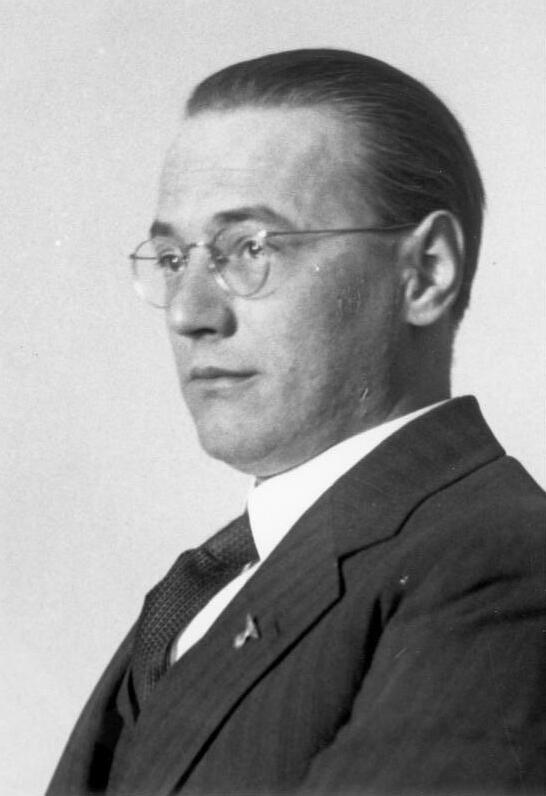
Otto Langmann was in Guatemala in 1930.

Several Lutheran German missionaries arrived in Guatemala. Some of these belonged to the Nazi Party.

==== Otto Langmann ====
The arrival of Pastor Otto Langmann (1898–1956) in 1930 in Guatemala can be described as the beginning of the Nazis in the German Colony. He supported an evangelical community in Guatemala; a year later he joined the NSDAP and founded the first Nazi groups abroad, Shortly after his arrival in Guatemala, which came with some members of the congregation, Langmann was the founder of the Epiphany of the Evangelical Church in Guatemala, Langmann had a very important role in rural areas of Guatemala and Guatemala City.

=== Dieseldorff family ===
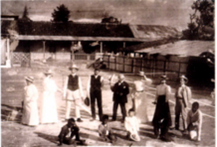
The Family Dieseldorff in Alta Verapaz, Guatemala

The name Dieseldorff means a lot to the people of Alta Verapaz. Besides having several coffee farms in the region, were the first Germans who came to the department. In 1934, when the German consul invited all members of the German community to receive the new German ambassador, the Dieseldorff family was not invited, because they were partly of Jewish decent.

By the end of his long career at sea, Dieseldorff Gualán chose Zacapa as his place to retire. There, he experimented with the cultivation of cotton, but lost his crops due to pests. This forced him to start a new trade (coffee) which brought him to Alta Verapaz, where he settled. The descendants of this family still have several farms in Alta Verapaz where coffee is grown.

=== Nazi sympathizers ===
Among the Germans who immigrated in the 1930s were some followers of National Socialism. The older, present generations in Alta Verapáz were not demonstrably attracted to the movement nor the Nazi Party. In 1933, with the accession of National Socialist Movement in Germany, Nazi patriotic and cultural anniversaries began to appear in the small confines of Cobán and Alta Verapáz, and a local National Socialist Party formed among Germans there. It has been claimed that in the mid-1930s all Germans in Alta Verapaz were Nazis; however, this claim is unfounded, as it is only anecdotal, and not all of German descent were in effect also Nazi.

In 1935–1936, a seminal event impacted the German community in La Verapaz: Nazi Germany asked their expatriate citizens to vote on the German annexation of Austria, the Anschluss. Some Germans in Guatemala held dual citizenship. A German boat anchored in Puerto Barrios to facilitate the vote. Those who attended were designated as sympathizers of Adolf Hitler. In 1936, 381 Germans in Guatemala voted for Adolf Hitler. Subsequently, most of the German landowners were deported, under pressure from the United States, for supporting the Nazi Party.

Cabinetry-maker Heinrich Gundelach and Protestant pastor Otto Langmann were founders of the Party's organization in Cobán. According to the book Los Alemanes en Guatemala by Regina Wagner, that same year (1938) the long-since present German School formed a Hitler Youth, practiced the salute, and discussed National Socialist race theory, disregarding that the German school also had students of Jewish descent. Thomas M. Leonard notes in The General History of Guatemala that the Buenos Aires newspaper Crítica de Buenos Aires reported in 1938 that Germany was building airfields in Guatemala. This claim was found to be untrue, but nonetheless garnered Washington's alarm, considering Guatemala to be the core of Nazi propaganda in Central America, as three quarters of the German population of the entire Central American isthmus at the time lived in Guatemala.

== German culture in Guatemala ==
The Germans introduced much of their culture in Guatemala Christmas traditions, one of which was the Christmas tree introduced in the late nineteenth century, according to a belief that Germans traian Christmas tree is: "It is said that St. Boniface evangelized Germany, downed tree representing the god Odin, and in the same place planted a pine, a symbol of enduring love of God and adorned with apples and candles, giving a Christian symbolism: apples represented the temptations, original sin and sins of men candles represent Christ, the light of the world and receive the grace that men who accept Jesus as their Savior." This custom spread throughout Europe in the Middle Ages and the conquests and migrations came to America. Christmas carols and hymns were composed by German missionaries arrived in Guatemala then by inserting it to principios twentieth century German Guatemala introduced the tradition or belief in Santa Claus or Nicolas, which is currently very popular. The German teacher Eddy Vielman introduced in 1995 Nutcracker in Guatemala, currently he direct this work that appears in every Christmas, also contributes to the culture of Scenic Arts in Guatemala.

The beer industry in Guatemala City and Cobán had much cooperation of German immigrants. The representative Gallo beer of Guatemala has German roots of national flavor to the brewery industry.

In other traditions, the Oktoberfest is held in Guatemala City, Cobán, San Juan Chamelco, Zacapa, Quetzaltenango and Antigua Guatemala, this celebration was introduced by the Germans and became very popular.

Today in Cobán, the Alta Verapaz departmental governmental seat, extant 19th century German stylistic and cultural tastes can be noted in houses, cathedrals, parks, clock towers, in the administrative palace, and as well in other Alta Verapaz cities such as San Juan Chamelco.

=== German festival in Guatemala ===
In October 2014, the German school in Guatemala and special guest the German Ambassador to Guatemala, Matthias Sonn, celebrated the 25th anniversary of the fall of the Berlin Wall and the 24 years of German unification. The students sang hymns and participated in a presentation symbolically tearing down a wall decorated with drawings.

Oktoberfest, introduced by the first German immigrants, is celebrated in Guatemala City, Antigua Guatemala and Alta Verapaz.

=== German language in Guatemala ===
The Alexander von Humboldt Association created a German school in Cobán, followed by schools in Quetzaltenango and Guatemala City. After World War II, the school was closed since it was associated with the Nazis, but reopened for 1958. The Asociación Alexander von Humboldt runs the German School, the German Language Institute, the German Cultural Institute and the Club Alemán. More than 1,000 students attend the German School for twelve years after which they can get the German Abitur that enables them to study at German universities without preparatory courses. In recent years, the number of pupils who are interested in studying in Germany has grown steadily. The German Academic Exchange Service (DAAD) has sent an academic teacher to Guatemala.

=== Die Zivilisationsbringer (documentary film) ===
In 1998, documentarians Uli Stelzner and Thomas Walther filmed a documentary, The Civilizer (Die Zivilisationsbringer), interviewing members of current German entrepreneurial elite in Alta Verapaz and Guatemala City and finding claims to have "unmasked the German racism", that the offspring of scions of the first Germans who came to Guatemala in the 1880s are "still convinced of belonging to a superior culture".

=== German communities and contributions in Guatemala currently ===
Guatemala is one of the partner countries with which Germany enjoys close development cooperation based on intergovernmental agreements. Germany is one of the country's largest donors. Cooperation focuses on the priority areas of "democratic governance with equity" and "education". Germany also contributes to the economic, industrial development, and contributes to security in the country. Germany is the main trading partner of Guatemala in Europe, also is the European country that more has diplomatic relations in Guatemala.

=== Associations and cooperations ===
The German Embassy in Guatemala assert that there are approximately more than 10,000 Germans living permanently in Guatemala in 2010, also asserts that these are German citizens who are made to live in Guatemala tourism, business, and cooperatives.

- The German Embassy to Guatemala
- the German-Guatemalan technical cooperation.
- German farmers cooperative in Guatemala.
- German club of Guatemala
- Economic cooperation

=== German industries in Guatemala ===
- Industrias Salchichas Bremen (this industry is Guatemalan and their owners are descendants of the German family Bremen)
- Industria Alemana de Alimentos, S.A. en Guatemala
- Cámara de Comercio e Industria Guatemalteco-Alemana
- Multinacional Alemana-Guatemala
- Ventanas Alemanas, S.A
- AHK Guatemala
- Henkel Guatemala
- Hamburg Sued Guatemala, S.A. (formed in 2009 when Sven Rose was appointed its first managing director)

== See also ==
- Germany–Guatemala relations
- Italian immigration to Guatemala
- Spaniards in Guatemala
- German diaspora
- Immigration to Guatemala
