= Germany–Guatemala relations =

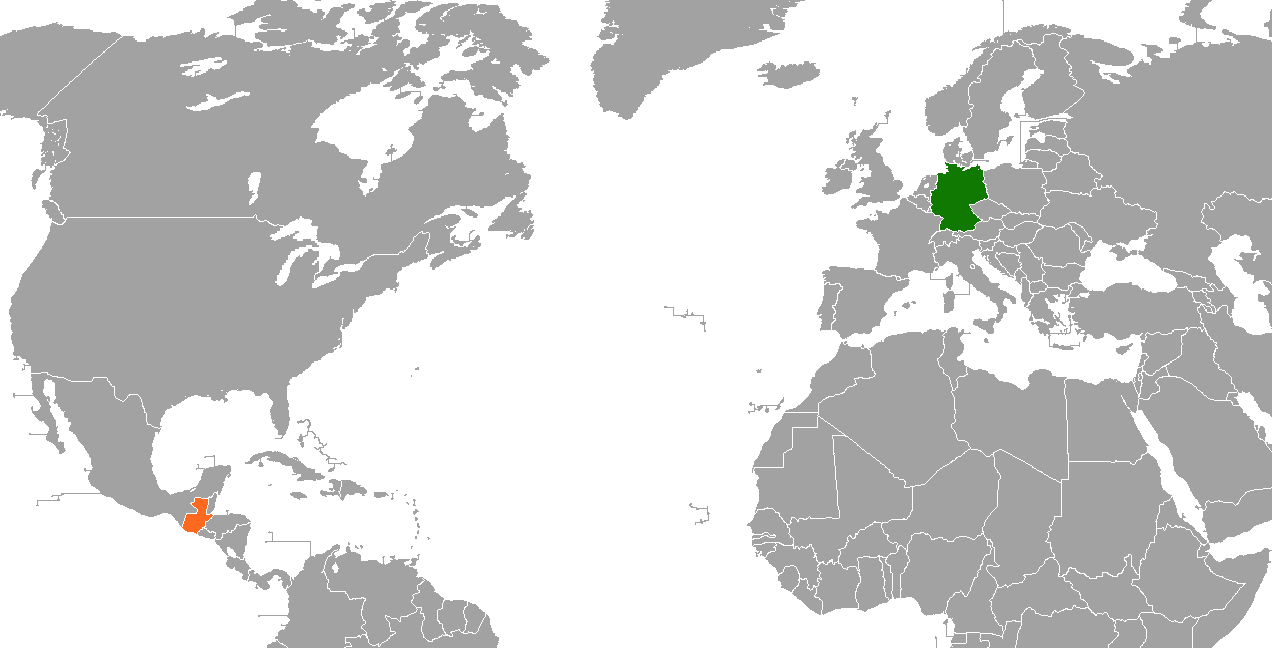

- Germany: Guatemala

Germany–Guatemala relations are relations between Germany and Guatemala. Both countries have maintained diplomatic relations since the early 19th century. From the mid-19th century, several thousand Germans moved to the Central American country, which is why there are still people of German origin in Guatemala today. In 1959, after the end of World War II, diplomatic relations were established between Guatemala and the Federal Republic of Germany.

== History ==
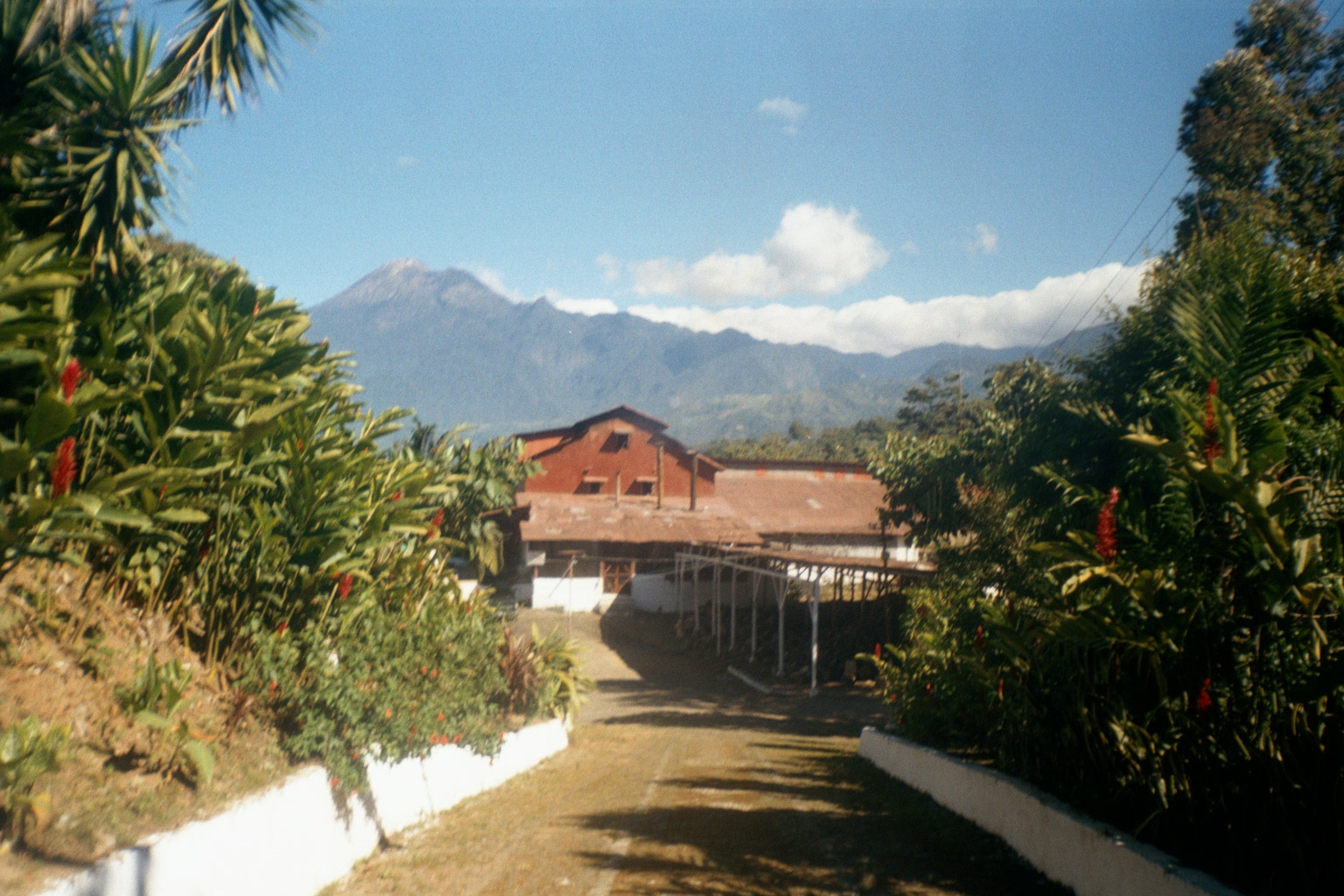
A coffee plantation established by German immigrants

In 1827, Carl Friedrich Rudolf Klee settled in Guatemala, where he founded the trading company Elster, Klee & Co. In the 1840s, he became consul of the Hanseatic cities of Bremen, Hamburg and Lübeck in Central America. A Prussian commission visited the Mosquito Coast in 1845, which led to ambitions for the establishment of German colonies in the region. From the mid-19th century, there was an increased influx of German settlers to Guatemala, who set up agricultural businesses. One of the first German immigrants to Guatemala was Rodolfo Dieseldorff in 1863. German immigration was concentrated in Alta Verapaz (in particular the city of Cobán, where a German Club was founded in 1888) and Quetzaltenango. In Alta Verapaz, the Germans became an economically dominant class, and by the end of the 19th century, they controlled two-thirds of the coffee cultivation in the region. A German school was opened in Guatemala City in 1892.

German immigration also favored the political and economic relations between both nations. The German Reich concluded a friendship, trade, shipping and consular treaty with Guatemala on September 10, 1887. Guatemala became a focus of German foreign investment in Central America, in 1894, for example, the construction of a railway line to Verapaz was paid for with funds from Germany. There was also increased cultural exchange, and in 1895 the German specialist in ancient American studies, Eduard Seler, explored the sites of Huehuetenango. The First World War eventually led to a break in the close relations and in 1917 the Guatemalan President Manuel Estrada Cabrera expropriated German assets and declared war on the German Empire in April 1918. After the conclusion of a peace treaty with Guatemala on October 2, 1919, Germans could buy back their expropriated property.

In 1922, Franz von Tattenbach became the first German diplomat to be sent to Guatemala again. In 1931, Pastor Otto Langmann founded the first group of the NSDAP abroad in Guatemala, which tried to mobilize support among the German-born in the country. Guatemala initially stayed out of the Second World War, with President Jorge Ubico declaring the country neutral on September 4, 1941. However, Guatemala later joined the Allies: on December 9, 1941, it declared war on Japan, and three days later it declared war on Germany and Italy. Ubico allowed the United States to establish an air base in the country. Under pressure from the United States, numerous Germans living in the country were arrested and interned as potential enemies in New Orleans. German property in Guatemala was confiscated again and nationalized in 1945.

Diplomatic relations between Guatemala and West Germany were established in 1959, after the end of the war, with West Germany. Guatemala never established official relations with East Germany. In the following years, relations developed well and in 1965, the German Chamber of Industry and Commerce set up a location in Guatemala. However, on March 31, 1970, Karl Graf von Spreti, the German ambassador to Guatemala, was kidnapped by the left-wing extremist guerrilla FAR. After the Guatemalan government refused to pay the ransom, von Spreti's body was found shot in April 1970, which led to a brief interruption in relations between the two countries. After a period of time, relations recovered and in 1987, the president of Germany, Richard von Weizsäcker, visited Guatemala. In 2000, Guatemala moved its embassy from Bonn to Berlin following German reunification.

== Economic relations ==
In 2024, German exports of goods to Guatemala amounted to 479 million euros and imports from the country to 215 million euros. Guatemala thus ranked 98th among Germany's trading partners. In October 2006, an investment protection agreement between the two countries came into force.

The Deutsche Gesellschaft für Internationale Zusammenarbeit (GIZ) is present in Guatemala. The priorities of development cooperation are democratic governance, vocational training and labor market development, migration, environmental protection and energy supply. In addition to the GIZ, various church and civil society organizations from Germany are represented in the country.

== Cultural relations ==
The Alexander von Humboldt Foundation is the sponsor of the German School in Guatemala City, the German Language Institute, the German Cultural Institute and the "Club Alemán". The German Abitur can be obtained at the German School. The German Academic Exchange Service (DAAD) enables student exchanges and awards scholarships for this purpose.

German immigrants influenced Guatemalan culture, for example by introducing the Christmas tree and new brewing techniques for beer. The Oktoberfest, which was also introduced by the first German immigrants, is celebrated in Guatemala City, Antigua Guatemala and Alta Verapaz and other cities. In 2025, there were around 4,000 German citizens living in Guatemala.

== Resident diplomatic locations ==
- Germany has an embassy in Guatemala City.
- Guatemala has an embassy in Berlin.
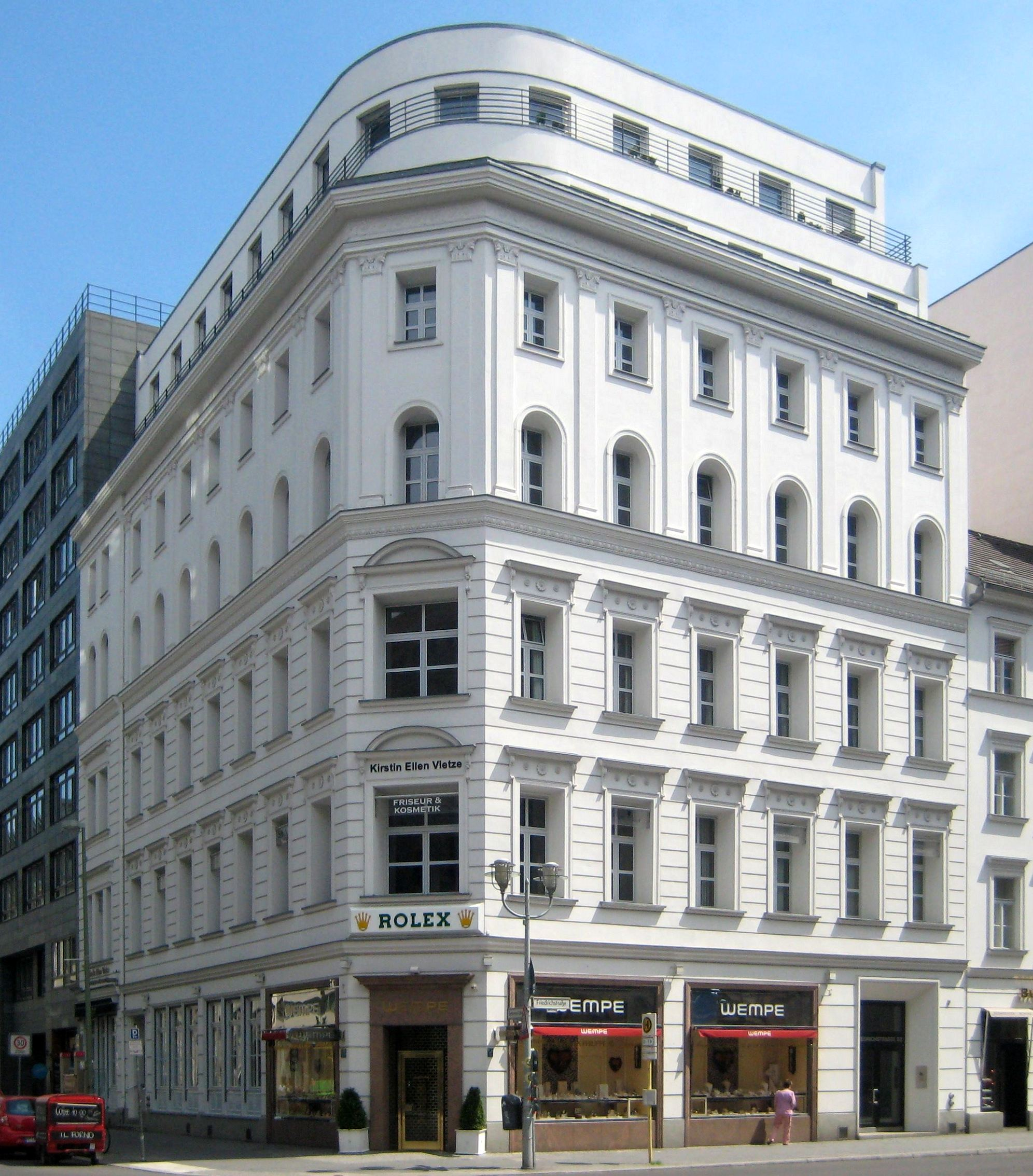
Building hosting the Embassy of Guatemala in Berlin

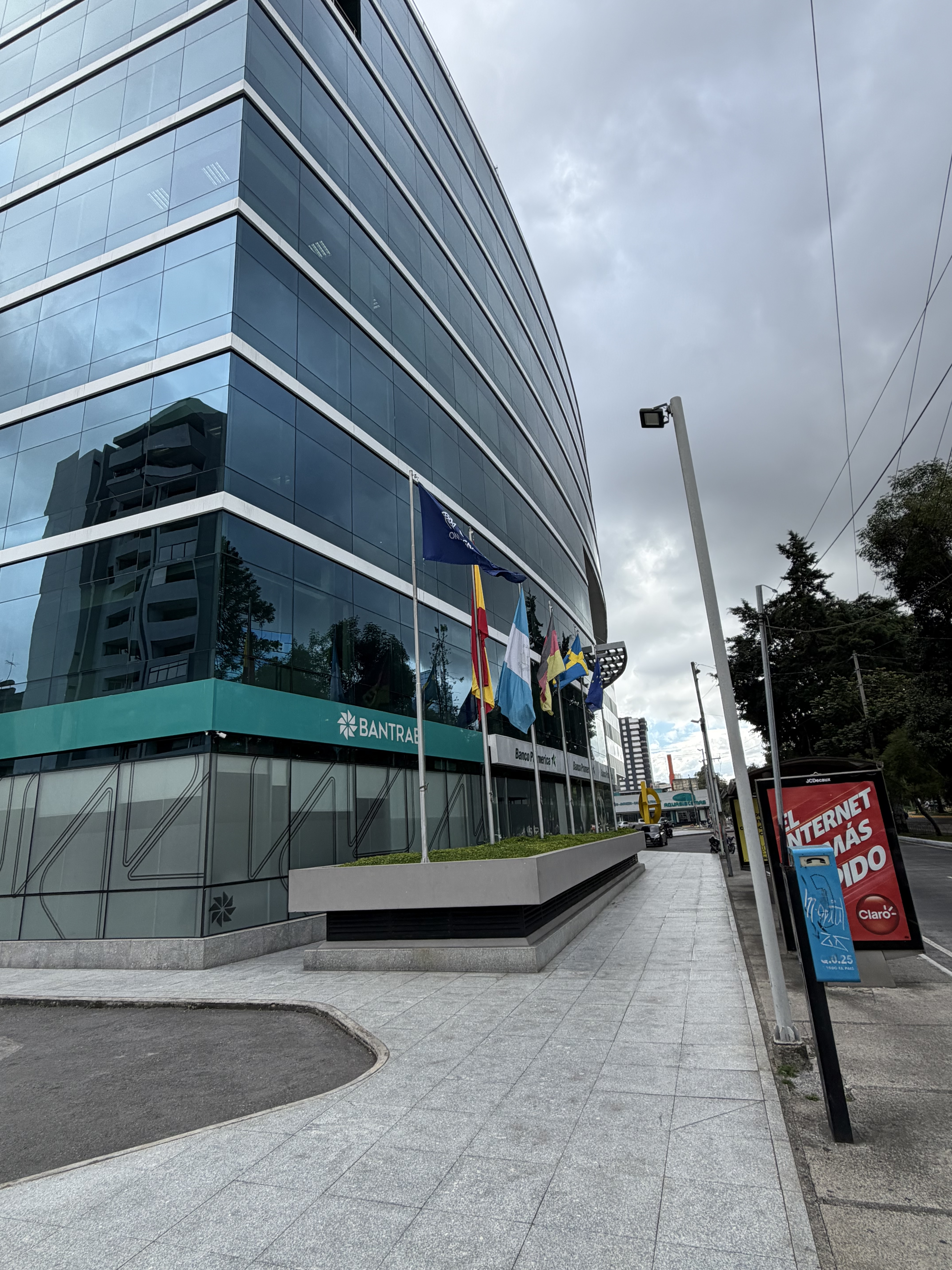
Building hosting the Embassy of Germany in Guatemala City
