= Demographics of Guatemala =

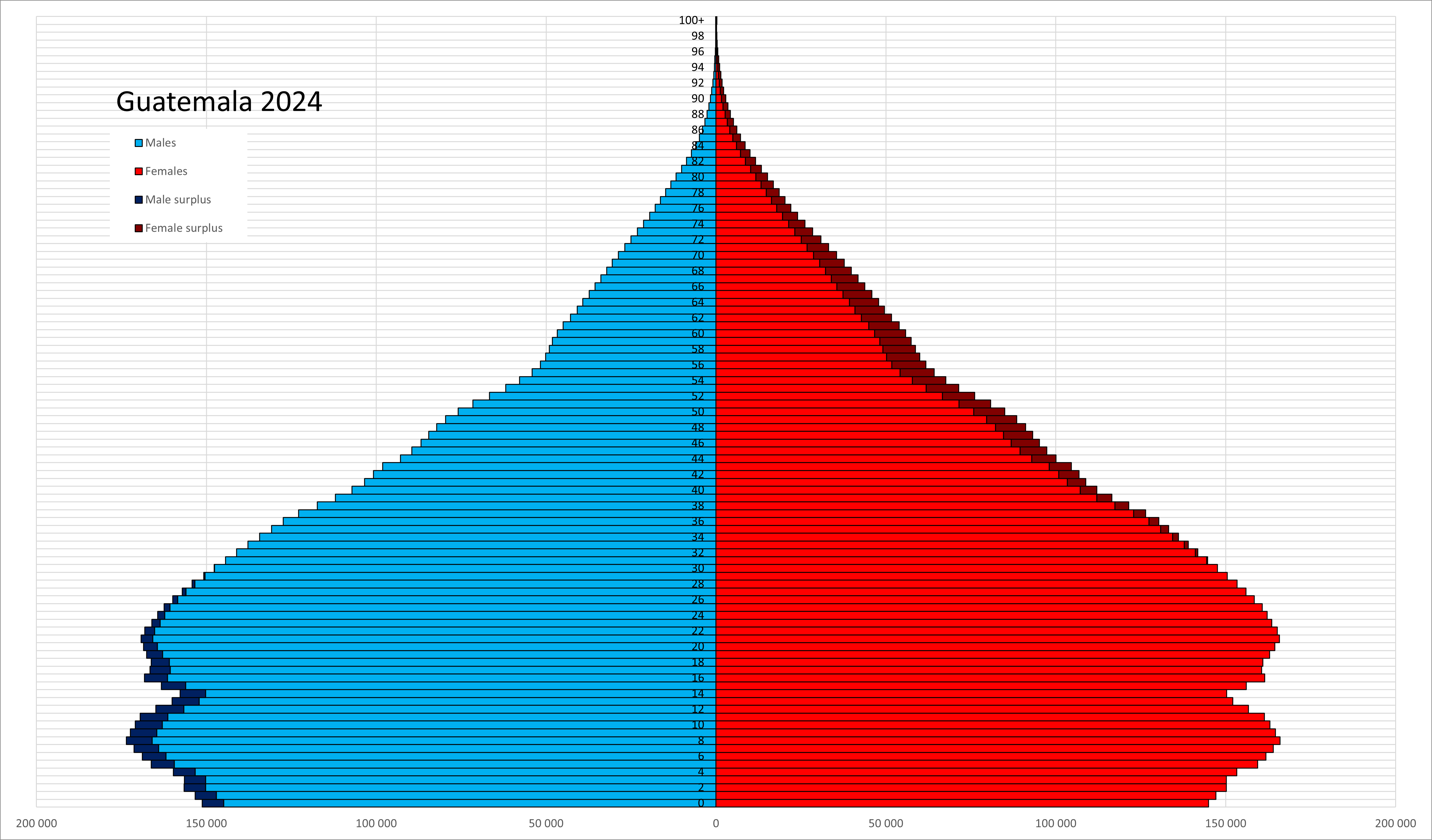
- Population pyramid of Guatemala in 2024
- Population: 18,255,216 (2024 est.)
- Growth rate: 1.58% (2022 est.)
- Birth rate: 19.5 births/1,000 population (2023 est.)
- Death rate: 4.91 deaths/1,000 population (2022 est.)
- Life expectancy: 72.91 years
  - male: 70.88 years
  - female: 75.04 years
- Fertility rate: 1.9 children born/woman (2024 est.)
- Infant mortality: 26.18 deaths/1,000 live births
- Net migration rate: −1.66 migrant(s)/1,000 population (2022 est.)

Age structure
- 0–14 years: 32.74%
- 15–64 years: 61.95%
- 65 and over: 5.31%

Sex ratio
- Total: 0.98 male(s)/female (2022 est.)
- At birth: 1.05 male(s)/female
- Under 15: 1.04 male(s)/female
- 65 and over: 0.68 male(s)/female

Nationality
- Nationality: Guatemalan
- Major ethnic: Mixed (56.14%); Ladino (56.01%); Garifuna (0.13%)
- Minor ethnic: Native (43.43%); Maya (41.66%); Xinca (1.77%); Black (0.19%); Others (0.24%)

Language
- Official: Spanish
- Spoken: Languages of Guatemala

This is a demography of the population of Guatemala including population density, ethnicity, education level, health of the populace, economic status, religious affiliations and other aspects of the population.

According to the 2018 census, 43.56% of the population is Indigenous including 41.66% Mayan, 1.77% Xinca, and 0.13% Garifuna (Mixed African and indigenous). Approximately 56% of the population is "non-Indigenous", referring to the Mestizo population (people of mixed European and indigenous descent) and the people of European origin (Ibero-Americano). These people are called Ladino in Guatemala. The population is divided almost evenly between rural and urban areas.

About 65% of the population speaks Spanish as a native language, with nearly all the rest speaking indigenous languages (there are 23 officially recognized indigenous languages).

== Population size and structure ==
Population census

Year	Pop.	±%
1778	396,149	—
1880	1,224,602	+209.1%
1893	1,364,678	+11.4%
1921	2,004,900	+46.9%
1940	2,400,000	+19.7%
1950	2,790,868	+16.3%

Year	Pop.	±%
1964	4,287,997	+53.6%
1973	5,160,221	+20.3%
1981	6,054,227	+17.3%
1994	8,331,874	+37.6%
2002	11,237,196	+34.9%
2018	14,901,286	+32.6%

View source data.
View source data.
View source data.

According to the 2022 revision of the World Population Prospects the total population estimate was 17,608,483 in 2021. The proportion of the population below the age of 15 in 2010 was 41.5%, 54.1% were aged between 15 and 65 years of age, and 4.4% were aged 65 years or older.

Guatemala City is home to almost 3 million inhabitants. In 1900 Guatemala had a population of 1,885,000. Over the 21st century Guatemala's population grew by a factor of fourteen. Even though Guatemala's population grew by a factor of 14, it still wasn't the biggest jump in that region. Although Guatemala does have an increase in population, the annual population isn't the superior in that region of the world as well.

	Total population (x 1000)	Proportion aged 0–14 (%)	Proportion aged 15–64 (%)	Proportion aged 65+ (%)
1950	3 146	44.6	52.9	2.5
1955	3 619	45.4	52.0	2.6
1960	4 141	45.8	51.6	2.7
1965	4 736	45.2	52.0	2.8
1970	5 416	44.6	52.5	2.9
1975	6 194	44.8	52.3	2.9
1980	7 001	45.4	51.6	3.0
1985	7 920	45.7	51.2	3.1
1990	8 890	45.4	51.3	3.4
1995	9 984	44.9	51.4	3.7
2000	11 651	43.7	52.3	4.0
2005	13 096	42.3	53.6	4.2
2010	14 630	39.4	56.3	4.3
2015	16 252	36.2	59.3	4.5
2020	17 916	33.3	61.6	5.0

=== Structure of the population ===
Population Estimates by Sex and Age Group (01.VII.2005):

Age group	Male	Female	Total	%
Total	6 197 399	6 502 381	12 699 780	100
0–4	1 035 549	1 000 763	2 036 312	16.03
5–9	921 924	901 718	1 823 642	14.36
10–14	815 791	808 328	1 624 119	12.79
15–19	685 359	694 215	1 379 574	10.86
20–24	571 385	608 879	1 180 264	9.29
25–29	446 309	506 386	952 695	7.50
30–34	340 378	412 767	753 145	5.93
35–39	270 907	329 253	600 160	4.73
40–44	225 243	267 504	492 747	3.88
45–49	191 635	218 053	409 688	3.23
50–54	175 311	191 751	367 062	2.89
55–59	149 593	161 320	310 913	2.45
60–64	113 686	119 957	233 643	1.84
65–69	94 128	98 864	192 992	1.52
70–74	74 463	81 804	156 267	1.23
75–79	50 340	57 089	107 429	0.85
80+	35 398	43 730	79 128	0.62
Age group	Male	Female	Total	Percent
0–14	2 773 264	2 710 809	5 484 073	43.18
15–64	3 169 806	3 510 085	6 679 891	52.60
65+	254 329	281 487	535 816	4.22

Population Estimates by Sex and Age Group (01.VII.2010) (Projections based on the 2002 Population Census.):

Age group	Male	Female	Total	%
Total	7 003 337	7 358 328	14 361 666	100
0–4	1 103 521	1 062 224	2 165 745	15.08
5–9	1 017 180	987 490	2 004 670	13.96
10–14	906 603	891 659	1 798 262	12.52
15–19	794 459	795 688	1 590 147	11.07
20–24	646 911	675 214	1 322 125	9.21
25–29	538 214	590 746	1 128 960	7.86
30–34	418 535	494 657	913 192	6.36
35–39	323 010	402 681	725 691	5.05
40–44	258 454	321 849	580 303	4.04
45–49	215 304	260 145	475 449	3.31
50–54	182 662	211 040	393 702	2.74
55–59	165 910	184 214	350 124	2.44
60–64	139 395	152 936	292 331	2.04
65–69	103 433	111 058	214 491	1.49
70–74	81 809	88 219	170 028	1.18
75–79	60 257	68 733	128 990	0.90
80+	47 678	59 778	107 456	0.75
Age group	Male	Female	Total	Percent
0–14	3 027 304	2 941 373	5 968 677	41.56
15–64	3 682 856	4 089 167	7 772 023	54.12
65+	293 177	327 788	620 965	4.32

Population Estimates by Sex and Age Group (01.VII.2015) (Projections based on the 2002 Population Census.):

Age group	Male	Female	Total	%
Total	7 903 664	8 272 469	16 176 133	100
0–4	1 153 297	1 109 217	2 262 514	13.99
5–9	1 090 294	1 052 014	2 142 308	13.24
10–14	1 008 018	980 523	1 988 541	12.29
15–19	893 687	882 665	1 776 352	10.98
20–24	771 615	781 835	1 553 450	9.60
25–29	624 841	661 798	1 286 639	7.95
30–34	517 919	581 120	1 099 039	6.79
35–39	403 769	485 904	889 673	5.50
40–44	311 703	395 488	707 191	4.37
45–49	248 840	314 591	563 431	3.48
50–54	206 306	253 126	459 432	2.84
55–59	173 501	203 741	377 242	2.33
60–64	155 222	175 581	330 803	2.05
65+	344 652	394 866	739 518	4.57
Age group	Male	Female	Total	%
0–14	3 251 609	3 141 754	6 393 363	39.52
15–64	4 307 403	4 735 849	9 043 252	55.90
65+	344 652	394 866	739 518	4.57

Population Estimates by Sex and Age Group (01.VII.2020) (Source: National Institute of Statistics with the support of Population Division of ECLAC, 2019.):

Age group	Male	Female	Total	%
Total	8 297 763	8 560 570	16 858 333	100
0–4	964 534	923 439	1 887 973	11.20
5–9	942 751	904 725	1 847 476	10.96
10–14	908 851	875 615	1 784 466	10.59
15–19	902 462	876 901	1 779 363	10.55
20–24	856 396	847 945	1 704 341	10.11
25–29	758 833	769 162	1 527 995	9.06
30–34	639 958	666 481	1 306 439	7.75
35–39	516 111	558 703	1 074 814	6.38
40–44	418 920	475 152	894 072	5.30
45–49	335 429	396 737	732 166	4.34
50–54	264 478	316 929	581 407	3.45
55–59	210 286	256 500	466 786	2.77
60–64	169 897	206 911	376 808	2.24
65–69	135 380	163 324	298 704	1.77
70–74	106 158	124 792	230 950	1.37
75–79	76 784	88 274	165 058	0.98
80–84	48 603	56 589	105 192	0.62
85–89	26 355	31 866	58 221	0.35
90–94	11 376	14 392	25 768	0.15
95–99	3 406	4 595	8 001	0.05
100+	795	1 538	2 333	0.01
Age group	Male	Female	Total	Percent
0–14	2 816 136	2 703 779	5 519 915	32.74
15–64	5 072 770	5 371 421	10 444 191	61.95
65+	408 857	485 370	894 227	5.30

=== Population by departments ===
In Guatemala, there are 22 departments that make up the country. Each department has its own population, with Guatemala Department ranking at 1 with the highest population and El Progreso Department ranking at 22 with the lowest population.

Rank	Department	Pop.	Rank	Department	Pop.
1	Guatemala Department	3,306,397	12	Jutiapa	489,085
2	Huehuetenango	1,234,593	13	Izabal	445,125
3	Alta Verapaz	1,219,585	14	Chiquimula	397,202
4	San Marcos	1,095,997	15	Santa Rosa	367,569
5	Quiché	955,705	16	Jalapa	345,926
6	Quetzaltenango	844,906	17	Sacatepéquez	336,606
7	Escuintla	746,309	18	Retalhuleu	325,556
8	Petén	711,585	19	Baja Verapaz	291,903
9	Chimaltenango	666,938	20	Zacapa	291,903
10	Suchitepéquez	555,261	21	Totonicapán	134,373
11	Sololá	430,573	22	El Progreso	22,654
Overall Total: 15,806,675 (2014)
Source: National Institute of Statistics (INE)

According to the table, Guatemala Department accounts for 20% of the entire population in Guatemala, while El Progreso only accounts for 0.14% of the population. Sololá accounts for 2.7% of the population while ranking in the middle at 11. Overall, the rankings correlate to the percent of the population that each department contains.

== Vital statistics ==
=== Registered births and deaths ===
	Average population	Live births	Deaths	Natural change	Crude birth rate (per 1,000)	Death rate (per 1,000)	Natural change (per 1,000)	Crude migration change (per 1,000)	Fertility rate
1930	1,760,000	100,000	43,500	56,500	56.8	24.7	32.1		
1931	1,810,000	99,000	44,000	55,000	54.7	24.3	30.4	−2.8	
1932	1,860,000	93,600	43,900	49,700	50.3	23.6	26.7	0.2	
1933	1,910,000	90,700	52,100	38,600	47.5	27.3	20.2	6.1	
1934	1,940,000	92,205	60,051	32,154	47.5	31.0	16.6	−1.1	
1935	1,980,000	96,031	54,789	41,242	48.5	27.7	20.8	−0.6	
1936	2,020,000	97,646	50,604	47,042	48.3	25.1	23.3	−3.6	
1937	2,070,000	96,981	51,027	45,954	46.9	24.7	22.2	2.0	
1938	2,110,000	98,906	56,131	42,775	46.9	26.6	20.3	−1.3	
1939	2,150,000	102,908	64,117	38,791	47.9	29.8	18.0	0.6	
1940	2,200,000	106,998	55,083	51,915	48.6	25.0	23.6	−0.9	
1941	2,250,000	103,688	56,444	47,244	46.1	25.1	21.0	1.3	
1942	2,300,000	107,519	72,477	35,042	46.7	31.5	15.2	6.6	
1943	2,340,000	112,407	72,837	39,570	48.0	31.1	16.9	0.2	
1944	2,390,000	111,324	63,068	48,256	46.6	26.4	20.2	0.7	
1945	2,440,000	118,912	59,732	59,180	48.7	24.5	24.3	−3.8	
1946	2,500,000	120,525	61,641	58,884	48.2	24.7	23.6	0.5	
1947	2,570,000	134,066	63,316	70,750	52.2	24.6	27.5	−0.3	
1948	2,641,000	137,009	62,090	74,919	51.9	23.5	28.4	−1.5	
1949	2,724,000	140,596	59,277	81,319	51.6	21.8	29.9	0.6	
1950	3,146,000	142,673	61,234	81,439	48.1	20.6	27.4	108.3	
1951	3,238,000	151,416	56,550	94,866	49.6	18.5	31.1	−0.9	
1952	3,331,000	151,865	71,994	79,871	48.3	22.9	25.4	4.1	
1953	3,426,000	156,377	70,794	85,583	48.3	21.9	26.4	2.8	
1954	3,521,000	162,773	58,132	104,641	48.9	17.4	31.4	−2.8	
1955	3,619,000	158,856	67,088	91,768	46.3	19.6	26.7	1.8	
1956	3,719,000	163,301	66,280	97,021	46.2	18.8	27.5	0.8	
1957	3,820,000	170,381	70,933	99,448	46.9	19.5	27.4	0.4	
1958	3,924,000	172,745	75,634	97,111	46.2	20.2	26.0	1.8	
1959	4,031,000	181,740	63,010	118,730	47.2	16.4	30.8	−2.9	
1960	4,141,000	186,476	65,805	120,671	47.1	16.6	30.4	−2.6	
1961	4,253,000	193,833	63,287	130,546	47.5	15.5	32.0	−4.5	
1962	4,369,000	191,420	69,287	122,133	45.6	16.5	29.1	−1.4	
1963	4,488,000	197,671	71,449	126,222	45.8	16.6	29.2	−1.7	
1964	4,610,000	196,386	68,278	128,108	44.2	15.4	28.9	−1.4	
1965	4,736,000	201,059	74,830	126,229	44.0	16.4	27.6	−0.0	
1966	4,864,000	206,520	75,774	130,746	44.0	16.1	27.8	−0.6	
1967	4,996,000	201,816	71,191	130,625	41.8	14.8	27.1	0.3	
1968	5,132,000	211,679	79,421	132,258	42.7	16.0	26.7	0.7	
1969	5,271,000	215,397	85,174	130,223	42.2	16.7	25.5	1.7	
1970	5,416,000	212,151	77,333	134,818	40.5	14.7	25.7	1.9	
1971	5,565,000	229,674	75,223	154,451	42.6	14.0	28.6	−1.0	
1972	5,719,000	241,593	67,989	173,604	43.6	12.3	31.3	−3.5	
1973	5,877,000	238,498	69,454	169,044	41.8	12.2	29.6	−1.9	
1974	6,036,000	252,203	69,820	182,383	43.0	11.9	31.1	−4.0	
1975	6,194,000	249,332	78,708	170,624	41.4	13.1	28.4	−2.1	
1976	6,352,000	266,728	81,627	185,101	43.2	13.2	30.0	−4.4	
1977	6,510,000	284,747	71,777	212,970	45.0	11.3	33.6	−8.4	
1978	6,669,000	286,415	66,844	219,571	44.1	10.3	33.8	−9.3	
1979	6,832,000	295,972	72,274	223,698	44.5	10.9	33.6	−9.1	
1980	7,001,000	303,643	71,352	232,291	44.5	10.5	34.1	−9.3	
1981	7,177,000	308,413	75,658	232,755	44.1	10.8	33.3	−8.1	
1982	7,358,000	312,047	76,267	235,780	43.5	10.6	32.9	−7.4	
1983	7,543,000	306,827	74,462	232,365	41.7	10.1	31.6	−6.4	
1984	7,731,000	312,094	75,462	236,632	41.3	10.0	31.4	−6.4	
1985	7,920,000	326,849	69,455	257,394	42.2	9.0	33.3	−8.8	
1986	8,109,000	318,340	66,328	252,012	40.1	8.4	31.8	−8.0	
1987	8,299,000	319,942	66,404	253,538	39.4	8.2	31.2	−7.8	
1988	8,492,000	337,396	64,100	273,296	40.5	7.7	32.8	−9.7	
1989	8,688,000	340,807	61,548	279,259	39.9	7.2	32.7	−9.8	
1990	8,890,000	347,207	73,344	273,863	39.7	8.4	31.3	−8.3	
1991	9,099,000	359,904	72,896	287,008	39.6	8.0	31.5	−8.8	
1992	9,313,000	363,648	73,124	290,524	39.0	7.9	31.2	−8.4	
1993	9,533,000	370,138	73,870	296,268	38.8	7.7	31.1	−8.2	
1994	9,756,000	381,497	74,761	306,736	39.1	7.7	31.4	−8.8	
1995	9,984,000	371,091	65,159	305,932	37.2	6.5	30.6	−8.0	
1996	10,215,000	377,723	60,618	317,105	37.0	5.9	31.0	−8.6	
1997	10,450,000	387,862	67,691	320,171	37.1	6.5	30.6	−8.3	
1998	10,691,000	400,133	69,847	330,286	37.4	6.5	30.9	−8.5	
1999	10,942,000	409,034	65,139	343,895	37.4	6.0	31.4	−8.7	
2000	11,204,000	425,410	67,284	358,126	38.0	6.0	32.0	−8.8	
2001	11,479,000	415,338	68,041	347,297	36.2	5.9	30.3	−6.5	
2002	11,766,000	387,287	66,089	321,198	32.9	5.6	27.3	−3.0	
2003	12,063,000	375,092	66,695	308,397	31.1	5.5	25.6	−1.0	
2004	12,368,000	383,704	66,991	316,713	31.0	5.4	25.6	−1.0	
2005	12,679,000	374,066	71,039	303,027	29.5	5.6	23.9	0.6	3.796
2006	12,995,000	368,399	69,756	298,643	28.3	5.4	22.9	1.4	3.621
2007	13,318,000	366,128	70,030	296,098	27.4	5.2	22.2	2.1	3.461
2008	13,678,000	369,769	70,233	299,536	27.0	5.1	21.9	4.5	3.386
2009	14,000,190	351,628	71,707	279,921	25.1	5.1	20.0	3.1	3.122
2010	14,259,687	361,906	72,748	289,158	25.4	5.1	20.3	−2.1	3.095
2011	14,521,515	373,692	72,354	301,338	25.7	5.0	20.7	−2.8	3.088
2012	14,781,942	388,613	72,657	315,956	26.3	4.8	21.5	−3.8	3.105
2013	15,043,981	387,342	76,639	310,703	25.7	5.1	20.6	−3.3	3.050
2014	15,306,316	386,195	77,807	308,388	25.2	5.1	20.1	−3.1	3.046
2015	15,567,419	391,425	80,876	310,549	25.1	5.2	19.9	−3.2	2.896
2016	15,827,690	390,382	82,585	307,797	24.7	5.2	19.5	−3.1	2.804
2017	16,087,418	381,664	81,726	299,938	23.7	5.1	18.6	−2.5	2.663
2018	16,346,950 (C)	383,263	83,071	300,192	23.4	5.1	18.3	−2.5	2.617
2019	16,604,026	366,855	85,600	281,255	22.1	5.2	16.9	−1.5	2.464
2020	16,858,333	341,212	96,001	245,211	20.2	5.7	14.5	0.5	2.266
2021	17,109,746	345,149	118,465	226,684	20.2	6.8	13.4	1.5	2.261
2022	17,357,886	345,869	95,386	250,483	19.9	5.5	14.4	−0.1	2.242
2023	17,602,431	342,694	95,948	246,743	19.5	5.5	14.0	−0.1	2.205
2024	17,843,132	299,256	99,593	199,693	16.8	5.6	11.2	2.3	1.906
2025	18,079,810	286,539	96,064	190,475	15.8	5.3	10.5	2.6	1.808

(C) = Census results.

==== Current vital statistics ====
Period	Live births	Deaths	Natural increase
January – March 2024	68,391	23,279	+45,112
January – March 2025	62,674	22,899	+39,775
Difference	▼ –5,717 (–8.4%)	▼ –380 (–1.63%)	▼ –5,337

=== Demographic and Health Surveys ===
Total fertility rate (TFR) (wanted fertility rate) and crude birth rate (CBR):

Year	CBR (total)	TFR (total)	CBR (urban)	TFR (urban)	CBR (rural)	TFR (rural)
1987		5.6 (4.9)		4.1 (3.5)		6.5 (5.8)
1995		5.1 (4.0)		3.8 (3.0)		6.2 (4.8)
1998–99	38.0	5.0 (4.1)	34.8	4.1 (3.4)	40.1	5.8 (4.6)
2002		4.4		3.4		5.2
2008–09		3.6		2.9		4.2
2014–15	27.3	3.1 (2.6)	22.5	2.5 (2.0)	31.0	3.7 (3.0)

=== Marriage and childbearing ===
The legal age for females to get married in Guatemala was 14, but was raised to 16 with parental consent and 18 without in November 2015. This phenomenon, known as child marriage, is prevalent in Central America; in rural areas of Guatemala, 53% of 20 to 24-year-old women married before their 18th birthday. Once married, young girls are likely to abandon their education and are exposed to domestic and sexual violence. They are no longer seen as girls; their husbands, who are often older men, see them as servants. Frequently births are at home. Most of these women are isolated without networks of support.

In most cases, motherhood comes after marriage. However, due to the fact that these young women' bodies are not entirely developed, many pregnancies result in high complications and high risks for both the mother and baby, during and after labor. Because there is limited access to health services, women in Guatemala choose a different alternative when it comes to the care during and after child delivery. Pregnancies before marriage are on the rise and unmarried women make their decision based on their image more than their safety. Single Guatemalan women may choose midwives as their health care provider during pregnancy and delivery to avoid feeling ashamed. Other women know the midwives in the community personally so they opt for a private healthcare provider. Throughout the country, midwives are known as the providers of choice for approximately 80% of the births even though they are not professionally trained. This contributes to the increasing infant mortality rate of 100 per 1,000 births as reported in some Guatemalan communities.

== Ethnic groups ==
Ethnicity in Guatemala (2018)
1. Ladino (Mestizo) (56.0%)
2. Maya (41.7%)
3. Xinca (1.77%)
4. Sub-Saharan (0.19%)
5. Garifuna (Zambo) (0.13%)
6. Others (0.24%)

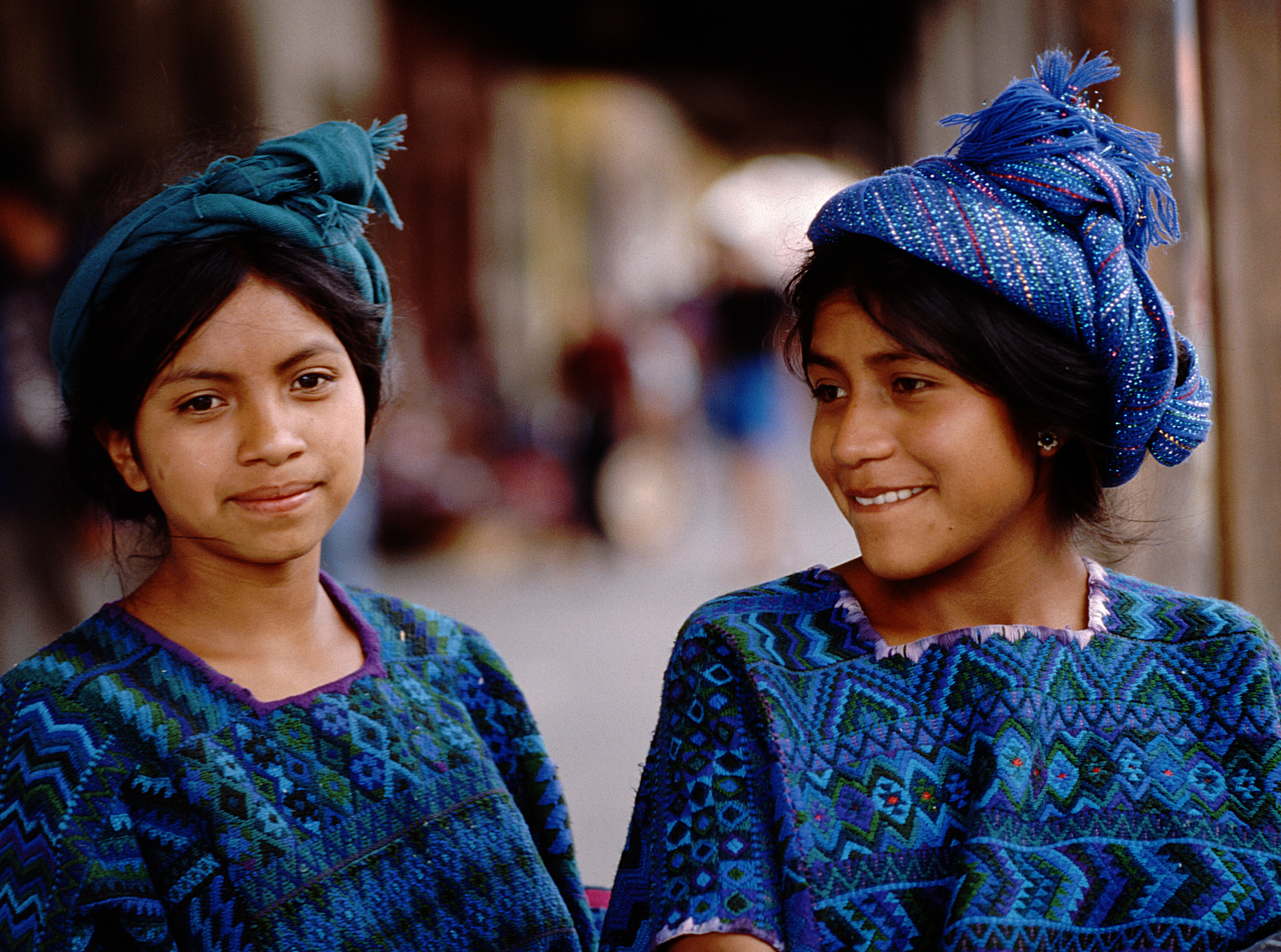
Indigenous girls in Chichicastenango

Official 2018 statistics indicate that approximately 56% of the population is "non-Indigenous", referring to the Mestizo population of mixed indigenous and European origins (50–52%) and the people of European origin (14-26%), Most are of Spanish, German and Italian descent. These people are called Ladino in Guatemala. Genetic testing indicates that Guatemalan Mestizos are of predominantly indigenous ancestry, although they have a high level of European ancestry as well.

Approximately 43.4% of the population is Indigenous and consist of 23 Maya groups and one non-Maya group. In 2012 these are divided as follows: K'iche 9.1%, 8.4% Kaqchikel, Mam 7.9%, 6.3% Q'eqchi', other Maya peoples 8.6%, 0.2% Indigenous non-Maya. They live all over the country, especially in the Guatemalan Highlands. While the official censuses usually count around 40% of the population as indigenous, some indigenous rights activists estimate the number to be closer to 60%.

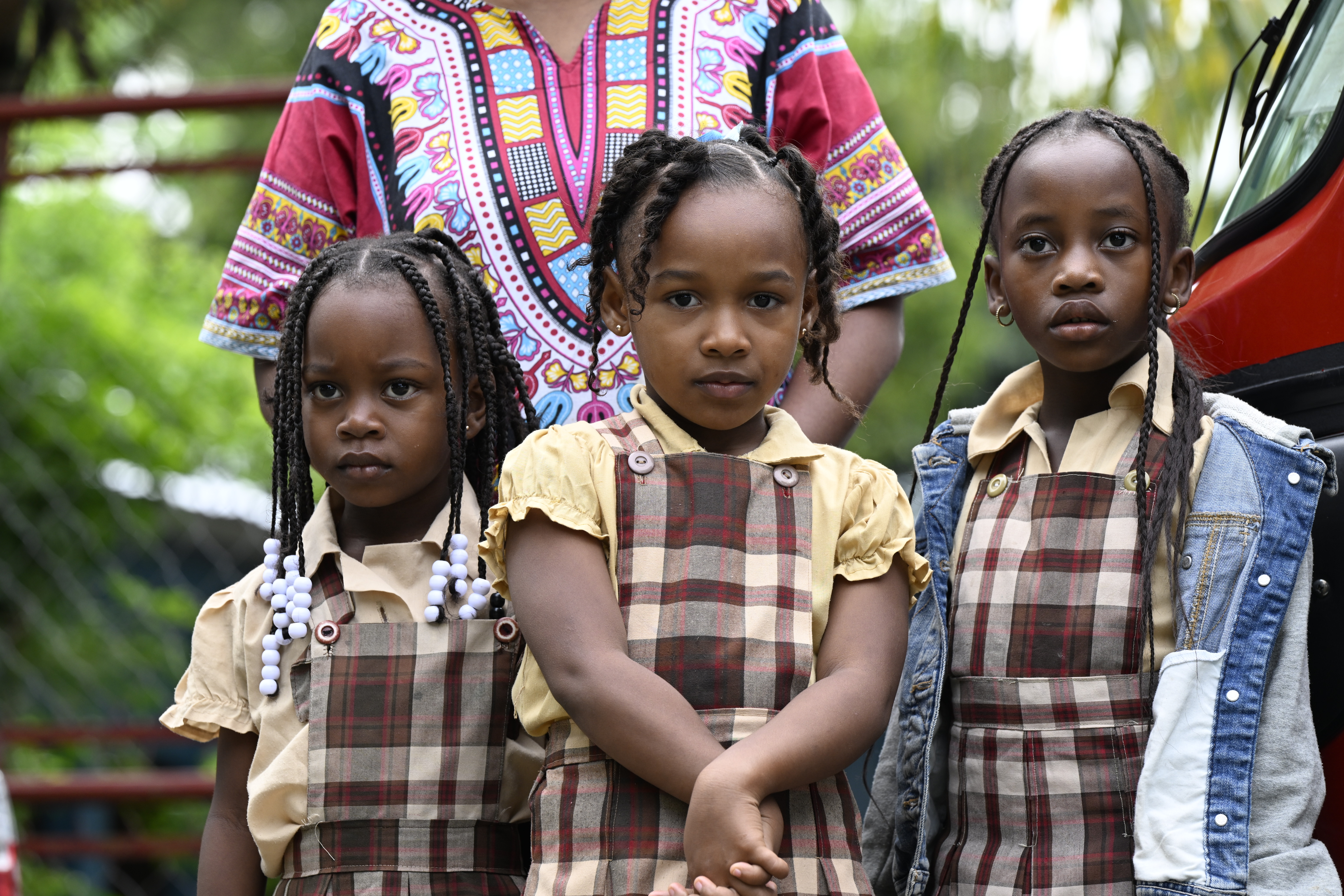
Garifuna children in Livingston, Izabal.

In the 2002 census, The Amerindian population in Guatemala included the K'iche' 9.1%, Kaqchikel 8.4%, Mam 7.9% and Q'eqchi 6.3%. 8.6% belongs to other Maya groups, 0.4% belong to non-Maya Indigenous peoples. The whole Indigenous community in Guatemala is about 40.5% of the population.

The Maya Civilization ruled Guatemala and the surrounding regions until around 1521 A.D. Following 1521 A.D., Guatemala became a Spanish colony for approximately three centuries, until in 1821 when Guatemala won its independence. Since the independence of Guatemala, the country has experienced a wide range of governments, including civilian and military governments. In 1996, a peace treaty was signed by the government that ended internal conflicts within the region, which caused over 200,000 casualties and approximately one million refugees.

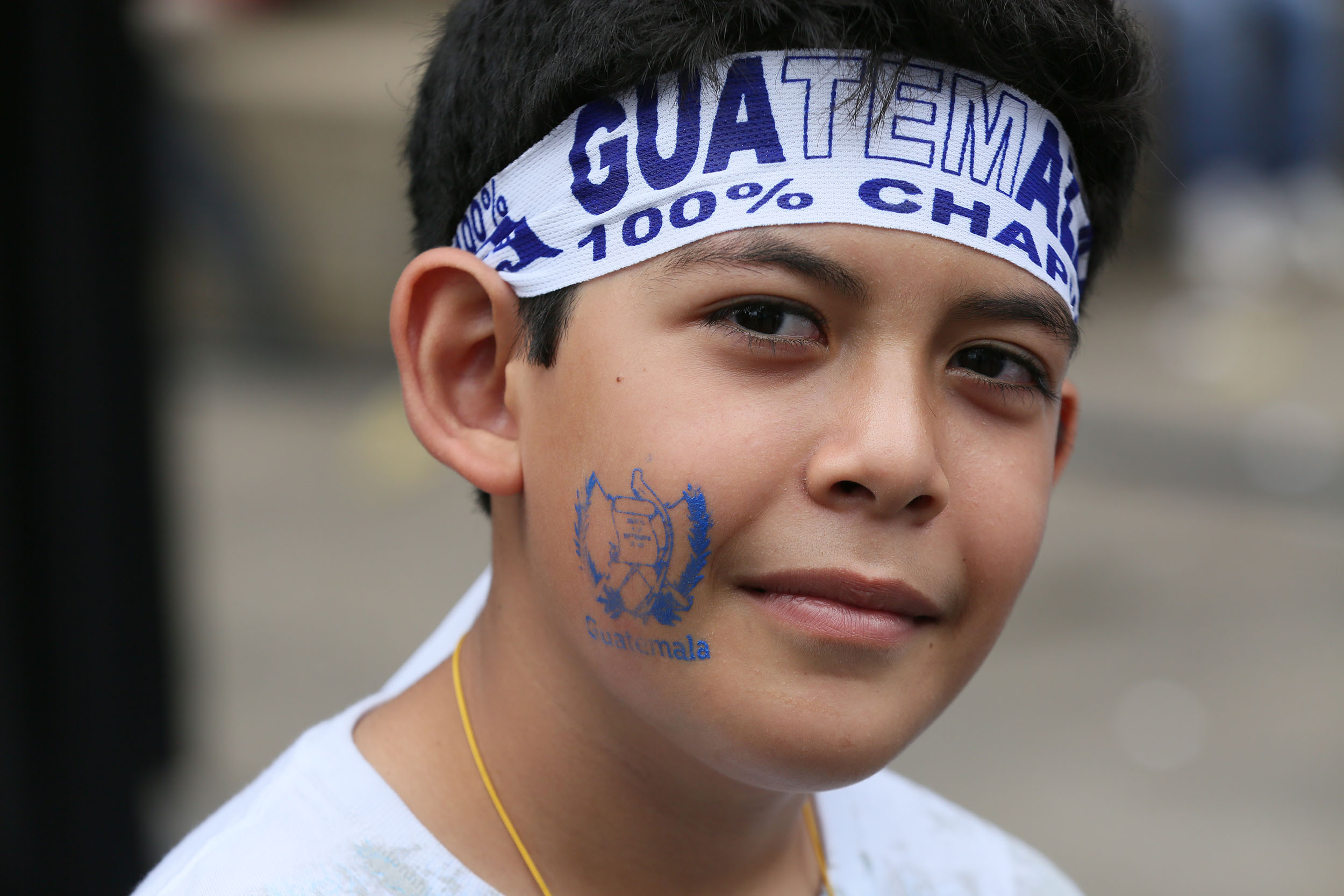
Guatemalan child in Guatemala City celebrating Independence Day.

The ethnic population in the Kingdom of Guatemala, at the time of Independence, amounted to nearly 600,000 Indians, 300,000 Castas (mostly Mestizos and a lesser number of Mulattos, Zambos, and Pardos), and 45,000 Criollos or Spaniards, with a very small number of English traders.

Other racial groups include numbers of Afro-Guatemalans, Afro-Mestizos, and Garifuna of mixed African and Indigenous Caribbean origins who live in the country's eastern end. Some Garifunas live mainly in Livingston, San Vicente and Puerto Barrios. They descend mainly from the Arawaks and Belizean Creoles.

There are also thousands of Jews residing in Guatemala. They are immigrants from Germany and Eastern Europe that arrived in the 19th century. Many immigrated during World War II. There are approximately 900 Jews living in Guatemala today. Most live in Guatemala City, Quezaltenango and San Marcos. Today, the Jewish community in Guatemala is about 60% Ashkenazi and 40% Sephardi.

In 2014, numerous members of the Hasidic communities Lev Tahor and Toiras Jesed began settling in the village of San Juan La Laguna. The mainstream Jewish community was reportedly dismayed and concerned that the arrival of communities with a more visible adherence to Judaism might stir up anti-Jewish sentiment. Despite the tropical heat, the members of the community continued to wear traditional Jewish clothing.

Guatemala has a community of East Asian descent, largely of Chinese and Korean origin. There are thousands of Arab Guatemalans descending from West Asian countries like Palestine, Syria, Jordan and Iraq. Some belong to Christian Churches while others to Islamic Mosques.

== Languages ==
The official language of Guatemala is Spanish. It is spoken by nearly 93% of the population and is found mainly in the departments of the Southern region, Eastern region, Guatemala City and Peten. Though the official language is Spanish, it is often the second language among the Indigenous population.

Approximately 23 additional Amerindian languages are spoken by more than 40% of the population. 21 Mayan languages, one indigenous, and one Arawakan are spoken in Guatemala. The most significant are; Quiche, Cakchiquel, Kekchi, Mam, Garifuna and Xinca.

There are also significant numbers of German, Chinese, French and English speakers.

Rank	Language	Language family
1	Spanish	Indo-European
2	K’iche’	Mayan
3	Q'eqchi'	Mayan
4	Kaqchikel	Mayan
5	Mam	Mayan
6	Poqomchi	Mayan
7	Tz’utujil	Mayan
8	Achí	Mayan
9	Q’anjob’al	Mayan
10	Ixil	Mayan
11	Akatek	Mayan
12	Jakaltek	Mayan
13	Chuj	Mayan
14	Poqomam	Mayan
15	Ch'orti'	Mayan
16	Awakatek	Mayan
17	Sakapultek	Mayan
18	Sipakapa	Mayan
19	Garífuna	Arawakan
20	Uspantek	Mayan
21	Tektitek	Mayan
22	Mopan	Mayan
23	Xincan languages	Isolate
24	Itza	Mayan

== Religion ==
Catholicism was the official religion during the colonial era, and today is the most professed church in the population, but since the 1960s, with the armed conflict, Protestantism has increased progressively, today around two fifths of Guatemalans are Protestant, specially Evangelicals (with Pentecostals as the biggest branch). Eastern and Oriental Orthodoxy claim rapid growth, especially among the Indigenous Maya. Other churches include the Church of Jesus Christ of Latter-day Saints, Jehovah's Witnesses, and other Christian minorities.

Indigenous beliefs are sometimes combined with Christianity. Maya religion believers only account for less than 0.1% of the population and since the mid-1990s the Constitution recognizes the rights of Maya Religion. The Islamic community in Guatemala is growing, and is projected to include at least 2,000 believers by 2030. There is a mosque in Guatemala City called the Islamic Da'wah Mosque of Guatemala (Spanish: Mezquita de Aldawaa Islámica). The president of the Islamic Community of the country is Jamal Mubarak.

Religious evolution in Guatemala
Year	% Catholic	% Protestants	% Others	% No religion
March 1986	62.1%	25.0%	3.5%	10.4%
March 1991	63.0%	19.4%	4.0%	13.6%
October 2001 – January 2002	55.8%	23.1%	3.8%	17.3%
June 2011	50.0%	35.0%	3.0%	12.0%
June 2017	44.5%	39.0%	3.3%	13.2%

== Emigration ==
The Guatemalan civil war from 1960 to 1996 led to mass emigration, particularly Guatemalan immigration to the United States. According to the International Organization for Migration, the total number of emigrants increased from 6,700 in the 1960s to 558,776 for the period 1995–2000; by 2005, the total number had reached 1.3 million. In 2013, the Migration Policy Institute (MPI) estimated that there were about 900,000 Guatemalan Americans (persons of Guatemalan origin in the United States).

Country	Count
United States	480,665 – 1,489,426
Mexico	23,529
Belize	14,693
Canada	14,256 – 34,665
Germany	5,989
Honduras	5,172
El Salvador	4,209
Spain	2,491
