= Immigration to Guatemala =

Immigration in Guatemala constitutes less than 1%, some 140,000 people, and most come from neighboring countries. Guatemala's historic ethnic composition is mostly immigrant stock from Europe and as well as Asian and Africans brought during the era of slavery. Currently, the composition of Guatemala consists mostly of mestizos, Amerindians and Europeans, and to a lesser extent, Garifuna. In recent decades, immigration to Guatemala has led to an increase in desire for more businesses and tourist attractions, after there had been a considerable drop from 1950 to 1980.

The government agency responsible for oversight of immigration is the Guatemalan Migration Institute.

== From the Americas ==
This can refer to immigrants and residents of neighboring countries, or of the same continent. There are communities from Argentina, Honduras, Nicaragua, Panama and Canada, to a lesser extent.

=== Salvadorans ===
Salvadorans in Guatemala refers to one of many recent Salvadoran diaspora when residents of the Central American country migrate to the exterior.

Due to the Salvadoran civil war in the 1980s many refugees were forced to leave the country. The majority received support in Guatemala, although the country also had its political problems, the capital was not being affected and other urban areas, where Salvadorans prefer to emigrate. By the 1980s, Central America began to manifest international migration within the region. By 1981, there were about 16,805 Salvadorans in Guatemala. Although for 1990 after the war, the number decreased, but in 2000 went back to manifest a new emigration that every time is growing.

=== Americans ===
Americans have come as immigrants since the 1940s. During the revolutionary period, the United Fruit Company overthrew President Jacobo Arbenz, and throughout the 1950s, the company controlled 80% of the banana business in Guatemala, as well as in other countries in Central America. Since the 1990s, Guatemala has had a notable growth of Americans in the country, some of which whom work in the tourism industry.

=== Mexicans ===
Guatemala has the fourth-highest number of Mexicans living outside of Mexico. The Mexican community has been primarily established in Guatemala City, Huehuetenango, Antigua Guatemala and Guatemalan border towns. Mexicans are the fourth-largest foreign community in the country, after the Germans, Koreans and Salvadorans.

In the 1990s, major Mexican business groups such as Grupo Bimbo, Gruma, Elektra, Banco Azteca, Soriana, Jumex, The Coca-Cola Company, Aeromexico and others moved or expanded operations, and found a growing market in Guatemala. As a result, many Mexicans living in Guatemala's large cities today have a high purchasing power.

Countless numbers of indigenous Mexicans in Chiapas, Campeche and Tabasco share familial bonds with some indigenous Guatemalans. The civil war during the 70s and 80s created a mass exodus to North American countries.

The migration of Mexican peoples between the fifth and thirteenth centuries established the common languages through the western and central Mesoamerica – as far south as Veracruz, Chiapas, the Isthmus of Tehuantepec, penetrating the Maya territory of Guatemala, Cuscatlan, El Salvador and Ometepe, Nicaragua. These countries have a common culture stretching back from the Hispanic period. Guatemala was part of the First Mexican Empire.

=== Costa Ricans ===
Costa Ricans are a small but growing group of immigrants from the Americas. According to a census (CEPAL/CELADE) in the year 2000, there were about 850 Costa Ricans in Guatemala, mainly in Guatemala City.

=== Colombians ===
According to a census (CEPAL/CELADE) in the year 2000, there were about 765 Colombians in Guatemala, mainly in Guatemala City.

== From Europe ==
This can refer to immigrants and residents of European countries. There are communities from England, Russia, Poland, Ireland and Portugal and Italy to a lesser extent.

=== Germans ===
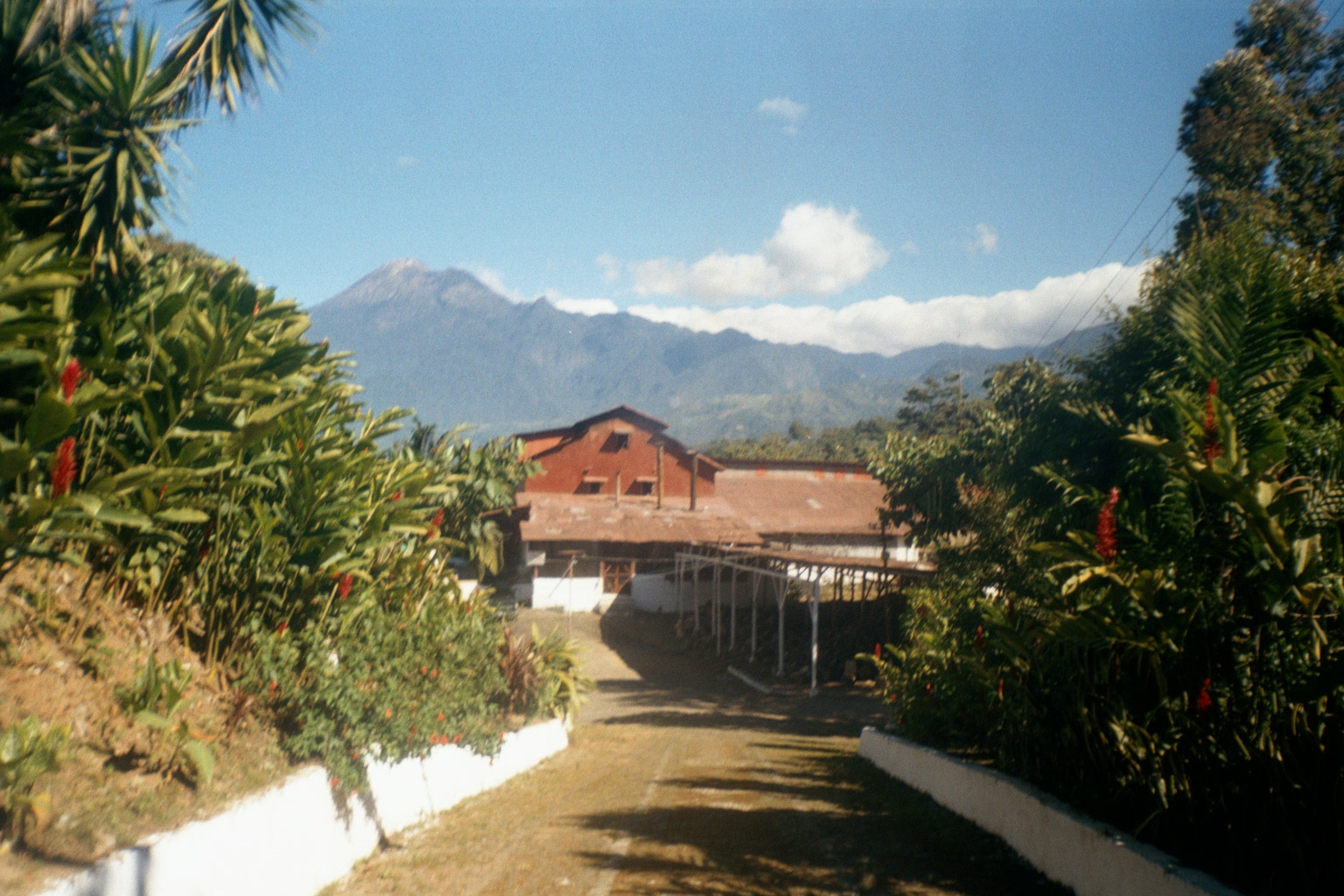
Coffee plantation estates built by the Germans

Immigration began with Rodolfo Dieseldorff in 1863. When he spoke highly of it, other Germans followed his example. The country was promoted by the liberal government of Justo Rufino Barrios (1873–1885), who invited to foreigners to come live in Guatemala. They showed a preference for the Germans, who made the move motivated by the fertile land fit for coffee cultivation. Regina Wagner, in her book The Germans in Guatemala, 1828–1944, said that what attracted the Germans to Verapaz was its "natural insulation, mild climate and fertile land, and the possibilities of agricultural and commercial development."

By the end of 1890, two-thirds of coffee production in that department was in the hands of Germans. By 1888, the Germans had formed their own world in Alta Verapaz, and a German Club was founded in Cobán, as well as a German school in 1930. In Cobán, the Germans came to monopolize trade in wholesale stores, and their coffee farms were dispersed in almost every region of Alta Verapaz. Due to this, German immigration expanded to other places such as San Juan Chamelco, Carlos V, etc. The Germans also worked to improved transportation. Younger Germans began mixing with indigenous Q'eqchi' women, which caused a gradual whitening of the population in that department.

By 1940, 8,000 Germans, or three-quarters of Germans in Central America were in Guatemala. This growth of Germans in Guatemala also led to fascism and Nazism in Guatemala. In the mid-1930s, it was claimed that all Germans living in Guatemala were Nazis; all fincas of German had the Nazi flag, and all German finqueros were involved in local meetings organized by the Nazis. However, this claim is unfounded, as it is only anecdotal, and not all Guatemalans of German descent were Nazi.

Guatemala continues to be the country which houses the largest German colony in Central America. Between 5,000 and 10,000 Germans live in Guatemala.

=== Belgians ===
The Belgian settlers arrived in Guatemala for 1840, as it was the desire of King Leopold of Belgium and the enthusiasm of Belgians capitalist entrepreneurs, very interested in the natural riches of the region of Izabal, Guatemala. That was how they left the Port of Antwerp on 16 March 1843 bound for Izabal, Guatemala. They embarked on the schooners of Theodore, Marie Louise and Ville de Bruxelles, which were established in the port of Santo Tomas de Castilla, 20, 7 and 8 May June of that year. Later to Santo Tomas de Castilla, on 5 March 1844 arrived the vessel Jean van Eycke, with 190 settlers, including settlers as Laurence Bhaten Korsz, Modeste Vanderhaegen, Theodore Vandestadt and others more. On 22 March 1844, also arrived the vessel named Emma, in which settlers came Aerens Pierre and his wife, and other settlers such as the Guise family, the Wirtz, Esmenhaud and others.These settlers apart from creating infrastructure in the region, and make families and descendants. There existed a plane where the Belgians settlers would be settled in Santo Tomas de Castilla. was elaborated by Captain Jean Dorm, but was unsuccessful, as many of the settlers were forgotten and after they died due to inclement weather tropical and others returned to Europe.

=== Spaniards ===
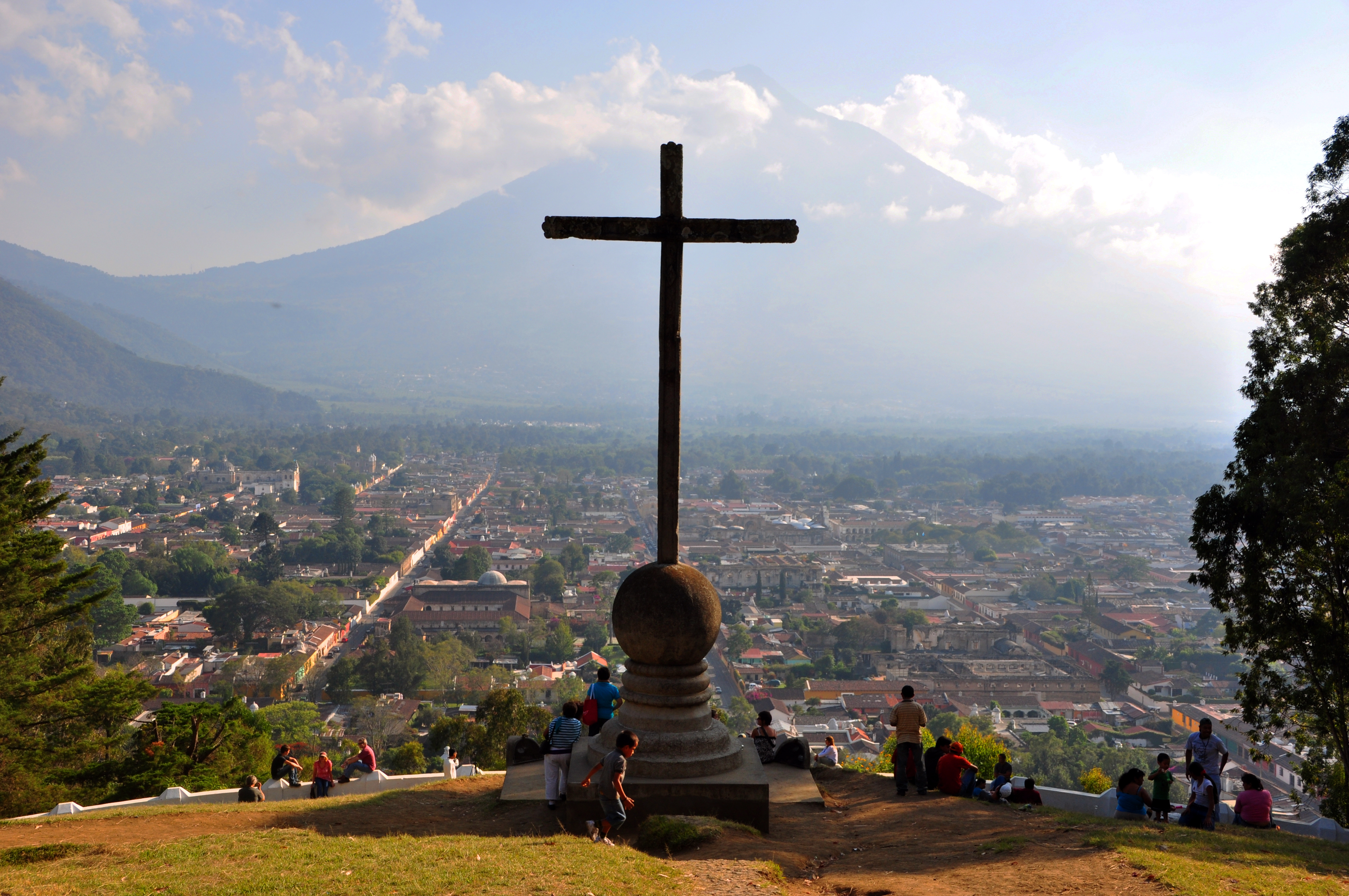
In Antigua Guatemala, various forms of Spanish architecture can be found as a testament to the colonial period.

The early European immigrants from Guatemala were Spaniards, and were soldiers from Andalucia, Extremadura and La Mancha, sent by Hernán Cortés to colonize Central America. who they conquered the indigenous Mayan population in 1524 and ruled for almost 300 years. By 1525 Don Pedro de Alvarado was named conqueror of Guatemala, as well as of Honduras and El Salvador. The Captaincy General of Guatemala was the primary province where the Spanish elite of Central America was. Approximately nearly 60% of Guatemala's population is descended from Spaniards, whether they are mixed or direct descendants. By the 1950s, the cultural center of Spain in Guatemala was founded and it is in Zone 4 of the capital. And since 1999 the Training Centre of the Spanish Cooperation in Antigua Guatemala has a Library and Documentation Centre specializes in Social Science and Development Cooperation in Antigua Guatemala.

=== French ===
The first French immigrants were politicians such as Nicolas Raoul, Isidore Saget, Henri Terralonge and officers Aluard, Courbal, Duplessis, Gibourdel and Goudot. Immigration was mainly driven due to the struggles of the independence in South America, where they acted French to such independence, later some French politics moved to Guatemala City, where struggles existed between liberals and conservatives. Later, when the Central American Federation was divided in the five countries of the isthmus, some of them went to establish Costa Rica, others to Nicaragua, although the majority still remained in Guatemala. Relationships also started in 1827, where the French began to arrive as politicians, scientists, painters, builders, singers, along with some families. Later a conservative government annihilated nearly all of relations between France and Guatemala, and most of French immigrants went to Costa Rica, but these relationships were to return again later in the nineteenth century.

=== Italians ===
Italian immigration in Guatemala is divided into three periods of migratory waves, the first being during the government of Justo Rufino Barrios, between 1873 and April 1885. He was greatly interested in bringing Italian families to the country, including: Bocaletti, Garzaro, Bonnato, Maselli, Comparini, Galliano and others, who devoted themselves mainly to agriculture. The second wave of Italian immigration was developed during the government of José María Reyna Barrios, between 1892 and 1898, during this period came mostly Italian architects and painters who with their help, modernized the country with infrastructure and new streets such as Avenida de la Reforma. The third period was during the government of Manuel Estrada Cabrera, between 1898 and 1920, during this time immigration was less than two times before. However, during this time mathematicians, scientists and teachers arrived who influenced in the education during the twentieth century.

=== Swiss ===
The Swiss immigrants in Guatemala, arrived in the later half of the nineteenth century, along with other immigrants from the Netherlands and settlers from Belgium and Germany. The Swiss immigrants boosted the manufacturing of chocolate in Guatemala, and they settled mainly in Guatemala City and Xelajú.

=== Danish ===
The Danish immigrants came with German settlers. Nearly five families came from Denmark in a vessel from Germany.

=== Dutch ===
The Dutch immigrants in Guatemala, arrived with Swiss immigrants, and settlers from Belgium and Germany. They arrived in the 1840s in a vessel from Belgium, where nearly ten families came from the Netherlands.

== From Asia ==
This can refer to immigrants and residents of Asian countries, and also other communities from Lebanon, the rest of the Arab world. Immigrants from India have a significant population, mainly consisting of business owning families from Gujarat.

=== Koreans ===
Koreans make up the largest Asian community in Guatemala, it is also one of the most recent diaspora that have come to Guatemala. The first Korean immigrants came to the country around 1985, two decades after massive migration to Hispanic America. Koreans in Guatemala are involved in processing activities, such as clothing factories which export to the United States, and other businesses such as restaurants, supermarkets, beauty salons, butcher shops, travel agencies and bakeries. In 1997, there were 2,000 Koreans. That number has been increasing. According to Youl Yoo Dong, president of the Association of Koreans in Guatemala, between 6,000–7,000 Koreans live in Guatemala. 90% live in the capital city. Due to this growth, a Korea Town has been established in Guatemala City, which will be called Seoul Avenue, located on the 32nd Avenue, between the roadway Mateo Flores and 1st Street, Zone 7 of the capital.

=== Chinese ===
Chinese immigration is another Asian diaspora in Guatemala. It began in the twentieth century, specifically during the period between 1890 and 1990. According to the book of Luodi-Shenggen vonference titled The Chinese in Guatemala (1890s–1990s) by José Campang Chang, immigrants take part in the country's economy, they do not lose their customs. The same book says that by the end of the nineteenth and early of twentieth century, Guatemala was a one-way traffic for Chinese that wanted to get to Chinatown in California.

Amelia Lau Carling, who was born in Guatemala, wrote a book about a Chinese family in Guatemala City which showed interactions between Mayan, Chinese, and Spanish elements of the country.

=== Jews ===
The Jewish immigrants arrived in Guatemala mid-nineteenth century, although historically Cuba, Guatemala and Mexico were the routes used by Jewish immigrants to go to the United States. Guatemala was not a route favorable to the Jews, and the governor try to limit their arrival. In 1932, the governor ordered the expulsion of all Jewish traders in the nation. Even after World War II, Guatemala had a large Jewish influx, from Greece, Turkey and Poland. Most Jews live in the city of Guatemala, with the rest in Quetzaltenango and San Marcos. As of 2012, 900 Jews were living in Guatemala.

=== Japanese ===
The Japanese are another Asian community in Guatemala that resides mostly in Guatemala City since the 1980s, and have taken part in economic development in the country. In October 2014, the Japanese princes Akishino and Kiko came to visit Guatemala with their main objective to strengthen ties between Guatemala and Japan.

== From Africa ==
In Guatemala, Africans came as slaves in Spanish vessels during the seventeenth century, who replaced the forced labor of the indigenous. Later these slaves mixed with one another, with whites forming a new mix of race called Mulatos, and also mixed with the indigenous women in the Caribbean region of Izabal, causing another type of mestizaje called Zambo. Later a new group of mixed Amerindian-black Carib people arrived in Guatemala called the Garifuna. After the English pirates took control in the island of St Vincent and exiled the Garifuna. They arrived in Livingston. Spain did not let allow passage of other Europeans to Puerto Barrios. Santo Tomás was the only predominantly mestizo region of the Caribbean coast. Africans later arrived from the former French African colony of Santo Domingo to Izabal, although later the French move most of them to Trujillo, Honduras. However since the early 1970s, there have been migrants from various African countries such as Democratic Republic of Congo, Cameroon, Senegal and many more, passing through Guatemala and Mexico to reach the United States and some to a lesser extent have settled in Guatemala throughout time.
