= Deportation of Germans from Latin America during World War II =

During World War II, 4,058 ethnic Germans along with several hundred other Axis-nationals living in Latin America were deported to the United States and their home countries, often at the behest of the US government. Although the arrest, internment and/or deportation of belligerent country nationals was common practice in both Axis and Allied countries (and their colonies) during both World War I and World War II, subsequent US Congressional investigations and reparations during the 1980s and 1990s, especially for Japanese Americans interned, have raised awareness of the injustice of such practices. Unlike Allied civilians held in Nazi concentration camps or those interned by the Japanese, Axis nationals interned in Allied countries did not suffer from systematic starvation and widespread mistreatment by their captors.

Although conducted ostensibly to curb Axis subterfuge, like the Internment of Japanese Canadians, the Internment of Japanese Americans, and the Internment of German Americans, many of the deportees were not supporters of the Nazi regime. Persons deported even included Jewish refugees who had fled Nazi Germany prior to the German declaration of war against the United States. Of the 4,656 deportees sent to the US in 1942, 2,242 were exchanged with Axis powers for citizens of Allied countries arrested and interned by the Axis powers and 2,414 remained in the US until the end of the war.

The deportation of Germans was preceded by the immigration of tens of thousands of German immigrants to Latin America during the 19th and early 20th centuries. While the vast majority of these immigrants integrated into Latin American societies, some still held German citizenship at the time of Germany's declaration of war in 1941. Prior to World War II both the German and U.S. governments were actively competing for political and economic influence across Latin America and with the outbreak of war the U.S. government was fearful that nationals of the belligerent countries could pose a threat. Subsequently several thousand German, Japanese and Italian nationals were arrested by Latin American governments and many were deported to internment camps in the U.S. for the duration of the conflict. A minority were even deported to Nazi Germany. Following the war most were repatriated to their home countries.

== Background ==
=== German Influence in Latin America ===
Germany's involvement in the region had existed since the 19th century. Waves of German immigrants had been generally welcomed into the region, partially as a result of the popularity of racist ideologies among Latin America's political and economic elites who often believed in the myth of the Protestant work ethic and the superiority of Northern European Protestants immigrants over Southern European Catholics. The Nazi German Government primarily viewed Latin America as a source of raw materials and attempted to deepen commercial relations with the region during the inter-war period. Germany offered military training and sold weapons to several Latin American governments in an attempt to undermine U.S. influence in the region. During the 1930s sympathetic far-right and fascist political movements, most notably Brazil's Integralism movement and Argentina's Nacionalismo movement attempted to gain control in their respective states. Following World War II thousands of Nazis would escape to Latin America and avoid capture by the Allies thanks to Nazi sympathizers in Latin America, some of whom held military and political positions in Latin America's governments.

=== American influence in Latin America ===
Since the establishment of the Monroe Doctrine the United States Government sought and gained an influential position in the Western Hemisphere. During the 1930s, the American intervention in the region, which began in 1898 (see the Spanish American War and the Banana Wars) on behalf of local elites and U.S. corporations, was replaced by the Good Neighbor policy which was made official at the Montevideo Convention in 1933. American influence in the region remained significant during the pre-war period and included the U.S. control over the recently built Panama Canal.

=== U.S. - Germany Relations in Latin America immediately prior to 1941 ===
By 1941, the US was supplying war materials to democracies fighting against the Axis powers under the Lend-Lease Act of 1941. The US Navy also assisted the Royal Navy against German submarines in the Atlantic and hostility against Germany spilled over to ethnic Germans in the United States and in Latin America. Ethnic Germans in Latin America were placed under surveillance at the behest of the US. Ethnic Germans in Latin America deemed “dangerous” were placed on the Proclaimed List of Certain Blocked Nationals. Created in June 1941 by the US, those of the list were subjected to economic sanction and were blocked from doing businesses with American companies.

== Rationale for deportation ==
=== Inadequate American intelligence ===
American intelligence on Latin America was very poor and inaccurate, thus overstating the threat of ethnic Germans in Latin America, motivating the deportation and internment. Pre-war American intelligence gathering in Latin America was dependent on embassy cables, reports by G-2 (Army intelligence), ONI (Naval Intelligence), and civilian volunteers. Latin America was shunned by talented officers as backwater and “prejudicial to their promotions”, therefore, intelligence staff posted in Latin America were often from the bottom of the barrel. For example, Colonel Carl Strong, the military attaché in Bogota, warned of a German attack on Colombia “via Dakar and Nepal,” demonstrating his ignorance of Latin American geography.

Intelligence work in Latin America became a priority as Nazi Germany advanced across Western Europe. In June 1940, the U.S. Federal Bureau of Investigation (FBI) was charged with monitoring Latin America by President Franklin Roosevelt. The ~700 FBI agents poured into Latin America were not much more competent. Agent Donald Charles Bird of the FBI was given two weeks of Spanish lessons before being sent to Brazil, a Portuguese speaking country. These intelligence officers often overstated the level of German influence in Latin America and grossly exaggerated the threat of ethnic Germans as a potential fifth column. One such example was the FBI’s portrayal of the 12,000 ethnic Germans in Bolivia as an imminent threat, ignoring the fact that 8,500 of them were Jews escaping from German-occupied Europe.

=== British disinformation ===
To further skew American assessment of the situation in Latin America, British Security Co-ordination (BSC), an arm of the British Secret Intelligence Service (MI6), fabricated many “evidences” of Nazi aggressions and infiltrations in Latin America to induce the US to join the war. These hoaxes and fabrications were in many cases readily accepted by American intelligence as truth. For example, in June 1940, the BSC forged a letter to implicate Major Elias Belmonte, former Bolivian military attaché to Berlin, in a German-sponsored coup plot in Bolivia. The letter and the alleged coup attempt became proof for German subversion in Latin America and was circulated by the FBI. On 27 October 1941, President Roosevelt dramatically announced,

"I have in my possession a secret map, made in Germany by Hitler's government - by planners of the new world order. [...] It is a map of South America and a part of Central America as Hitler proposes to reorganize it."

This map, printed in German, indicates plans to conquer South America and partition it into five satellite states. This map was also a fabrication by the BSC.

=== Overstated threat ===
The combination of inadequate American intelligence and abundant British disinformation convinced American policy-makers that the ethnic German population in Latin American constituted a threat to Latin America, and consequently, the United States. Lieutenant Jules Dubois, chief of the Intelligence Branch of the US Army in Panama declared,

“With their sights trained on Latin America, the Axis Powers began to groom puppets and sympathetic groups in every republic to seize the reigns [sic] of their governments’ machinery […] There were approximately three million Axis nationals residing in Latin American then, each of whom could have been made available to form part of a militant striking force capable of implementing the plans of the Axis at the appropriate time”

After the US entered the war, neutralizing the perceived threat against Latin America and securing the strategically important Panama Canal was seen by the US government as vital.

== Deportation ==
=== U.S. Government requests the arrest and deportation of “all dangerous aliens” ===
The United States elected to use internment and deportation to neutralise the perceived threat posed by ethnic Germans following American entry into war. Because of the perceived incompetence and possible German infiltration of Latin American governments, local internment was deemed insufficient as a solution.

Immediately after the attack on Pearl Harbor the Government of Panama carried out arrests of Japanese, German, and Italian nationals. Following the arrests the US Ambassador in Panama requested that the Panamanian government send the internees to the U.S., citing the logistical difficulties of housing and feeding the internees in Panama. On 20 January 1942, the US State Department instructed its embassies in Cuba, Guatemala, Nicaragua, Costa Rica, Honduras, El Salvador, the Dominican Republic, and Haiti to obtain an agreement to send “all dangerous aliens” to the US for internment. In neutral Colombia, US Ambassador Braden urged for the expulsion of Germans even before US entry to the war.

=== Latin American response to U.S. demand ===
The Latin American countries were generally receptive to American demands. Their motivation varied between American influence, promise of military and economic aid, domestic anti-German sentiments, and the opportunity to seize the land and property of the Germans. Panama, which was tightly controlled by the US, agreed to send the “more dangerous” internees to the US on 13 January 1942. Little opposition arose in the Latin American countries that have declared war on Germany. Guatemala, Nicaragua, Costa Rica, Honduras, El Salvador, the Dominican Republic, and Haiti all agreed to deport “dangerous enemy aliens” by mid-February 1942, while Cuba compromised with interning selected Germans in the isolated Isle of Pines (now Isla de la Juventud). Colombia initially refused American demands, citing national sovereignty and constitutional rights. She relented in November 1943 after she was promised military aid under Lend-Lease from the US. Together with Ecuador, Peru, and Bolivia, they agreed to send selected Germans to the US under the promise that the deportees will be repatriated to Germany rather than interned in the US.

=== Selection of deportees ===
The selection of deportees was arbitrary and inaccurate in picking out potentially dangerous Germans. The selection was conducted by both by local governments and by American instructions. In total, 4,058 Germans were deported to the US. The Proclaimed List of Certain Blocked Nationals was used as the basis for deportation in many Latin American countries. Many more ethnic Germans in Latin American were also selected for deportation. Outspoken Nazi Party members, such as Otto Krogmann, leader of the Nazi Party in Costa Rica and brother of Carl Vincent Krogmann, Nazi politician and mayor of Hamburg, were quickly arrested and deported.

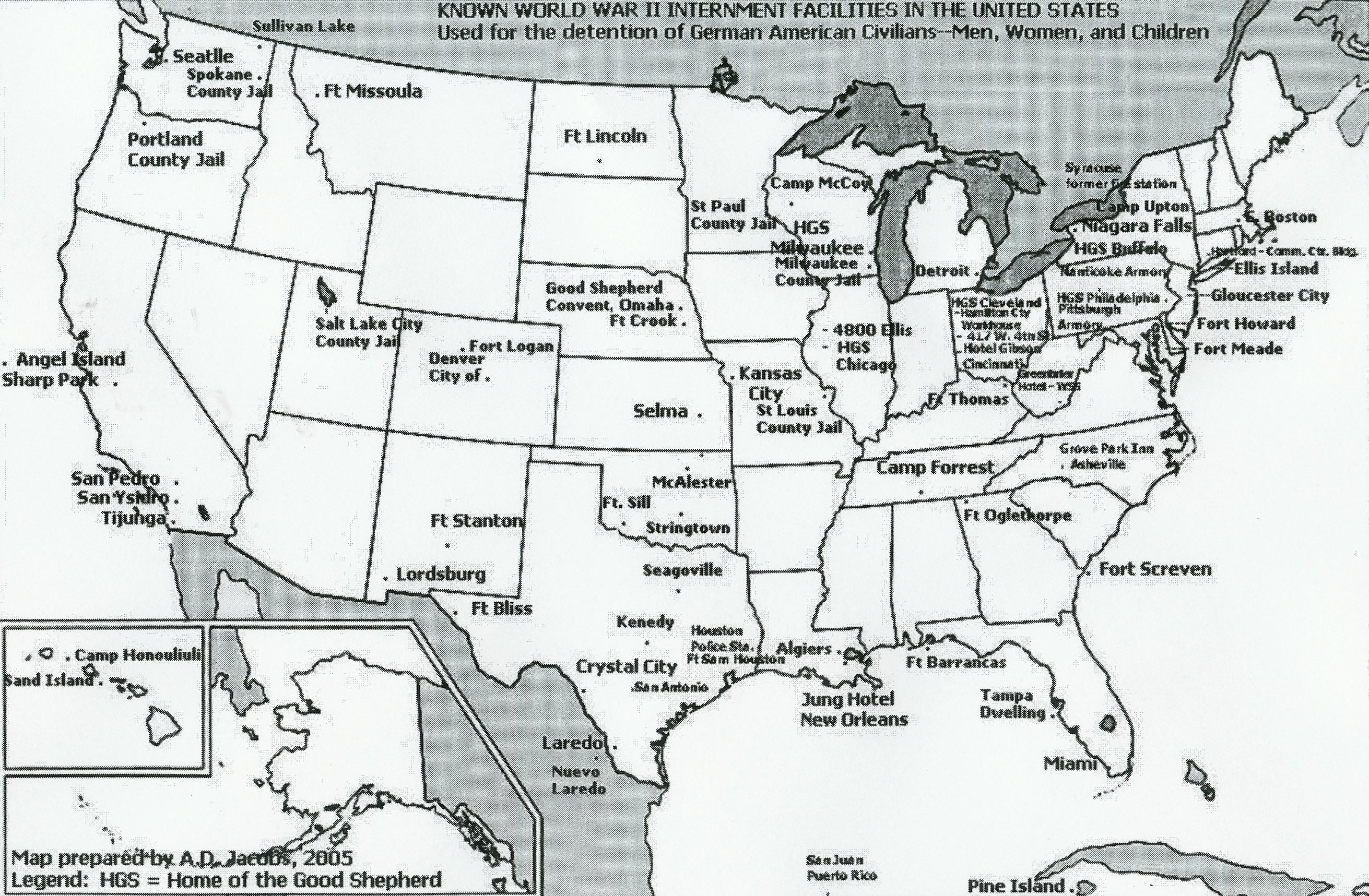
German American internment sites during World War II

However, many other ethnic Germans were also detained and deported with scant evidence. Carl Specht, a labour organiser for Indian rubber trappers in Colombia was deported without evidence. Post-war investigators noted that he “incurred the enmity of some of the American rubber interest”. After deportation to the US, he volunteered to join the US Army. Wilhelm Wiedermann, tractor driver and naturalised Costa Rican citizen, was also deported after being reported by the US military attaché Lt. Col. E. Andino. Andino was later dubbed “one of the most unreliable intelligence officers in the employ of the United States Government” by post-war investigator. In Panama, out of the 1000+ ethnic Germans interned, the “most dangerous” 150 of them along with their 97 family members were deported to the US. 30 of them were Jewish refugees, five of which had spent time in concentration camps before moving to Panama, while 37 members of the local Nazi Party were allowed to stay. The Justice Department concluded in 1943 that selection of internees and deportations were conducted “without inquiry as to the loyalty or the danger of the particular alien.”

== Internment ==
=== Legal basis of internment ===
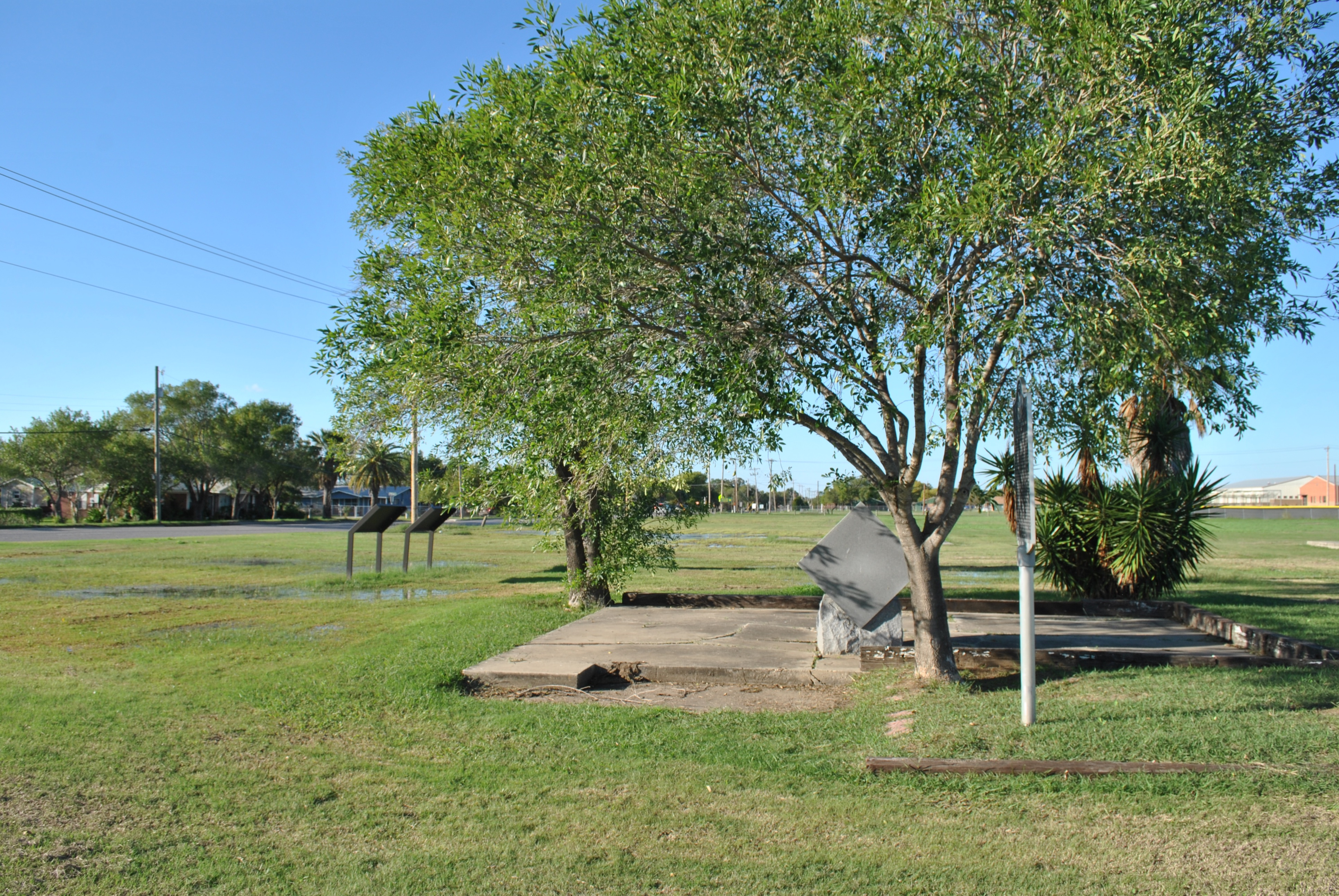
Internment camp memorial in Crystal City, Texas

Before their forced arrival to the United States, the deportees were deliberately not issued any visas. Once they arrived, they were arrested by the US Immigration and Naturalization Service (INS) as illegal immigrants, which formed the legal basis for the US government to intern or expel them.

=== Conditions of the internment camps ===
The conditions of the internment in the beginning were quite poor as it was believed that the internees would be quickly repatriated. Once it was clear that many internees would stay in the camps for extended period of time, the Justice Department, which operated the camps, began improving conditions. Internees of German, Japanese, and Italian descent from both the US and Latin America were interned together. Crystal City, a purpose-built internment camp for large families had notably good conditions. Japanese internees beautified the camp with gardening and landscaping; education was provided in English, German, Japanese, and Spanish; a swimming pool was built for the children, large families have their own house with kitchens, bathrooms, running water, and ice boxes. Karl-Albrecht Engel, one of the internees from the camp, reported in a letter to the German government:

“We grew tan and swelled up like doughnuts from the good meal. Three hot meals a day, starting with eggs and sausages in the morning and ending with oysters or meat and potatoes for dinner. The canteen sold three kinds of beer."

== Repatriation ==
=== Ecuador ===
As the war came to a close, many of the interned Ecuadorians in American detention camps began requesting permission to return home to Ecuador (Becker 317). Camilo Ponce, The Ecuadorian Minister for Foreign Relations, agreed to most of the requests, stating “the majority of them, if not all, are individuals who have lived most of their lives in this country and did not leave of their own free will”. In 1945 Ecuadorian Ambassador Galo Plaza petitioned the secretary of state for the return of Axis country nationals still in internment camps, noting the justification for deporting these residents was “to prevent them from engaging in subversive activities against the security of the American republics,” but now that the threat had passed. In 1946 the US State Department asked Ecuador if it would like those remaining in internment camps to return. Ecuador took control of its residents in April 1946 when an agreement was finalized and Ecuadorian residents began to return home.

=== Cuba, Peru, and Guatemala ===
For the Cuban and Peruvian residents interned in the United States efforts to return home were often improbable at best. Beginning in 1940 the American government took to blacklisting companies and individuals with German ties from these, and most, Latin American countries. The stated rationale was to deny funding to local Nazi sympathizing factions, however the reality was that these American policies made it increasingly difficult for any German detainee to return to their family and home. A nice side effect, for Washington, was of course the fact that in many cases these German companies were their greatest competitors in the region, so these blacklists effectively created American monopolies in certain industries.

By the end of the war, those held in internment camps were either sent to the Axis powers in return for American nationals, or were given leave to return home. Of the returnees, 15 were eventually interviewed on their experiences in the American internment camps. Repatriation was particularly difficult for returning deportees who would lose everything through the internment, as with the case of Hugo Droege, whose farm in Guatemala had been seized after he was forcibly taken to America. Party ties prior to deportation often made repatriation difficult, as with the case of Droege, and some others, affiliations with the Nazi party, called by Droege “not real membership” haunted them beyond the war.

=== Post-war ===
Many of the deported German Latin Americans who would return to South America saw great difficulty in continuing life the same. Many countries had adopted strict anti-Nazi and anti-German policies, contributing to the governments seizing German holdings across Latin America. Repatriation took much more than just returning home, it was a process of becoming at home in Latin America again, a process that took longer than many would have hoped.

== Aftermath and legacy ==
=== Aftermath ===
In the aftermath of the mass deportations, many companies owned by German deportees in Latin America were confiscated and expropriated, despite US intelligence recognizing that the resulting seizures would cause grave economic harm. Additionally, upon learning about the mass deportations of Germans from Latin America, the Nazi regime retaliated on the nations cooperating with the United States by scouring German-occupied territory for their citizens and forcibly interning them.

For the deportees, their fate after the war had varied greatly. Many had already been sent to Germany over the course of the war, but for those who had stayed in the US, some (depending on the country they had been deported from) were given the opportunity to return to Latin America. However, their return wasn’t necessarily the end of their ordeal, with many returning to find that their property and belongings had been confiscated. Additionally, these returning Germans found themselves marked and excluded from societies that the once thought of as home, as anti-immigrant and anti-German sentiment dogged many Latin American countries as a result of the deportations.

=== US Congressional investigation and reparations ===
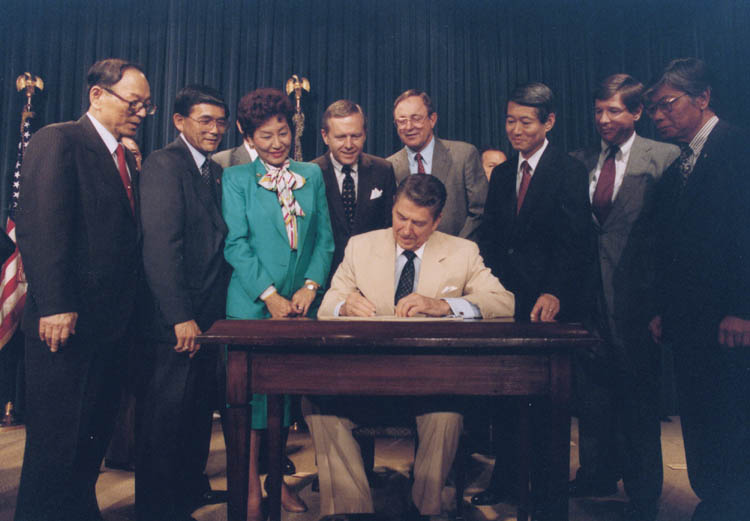
Ronald Reagan signing Japanese reparations bill

In 1980, a Commission was approved by Congress as a “fact finding study” to look into the deportation of civilians to U.S. internment camps. This commission published its report in 1983, bringing to light the US government’s actions in this period. However, this commission’s recognition of the treatment of German civilians from Latin Americans was limited only to its appendix. In 1988, the United States Congress passed the Civil Liberties Act of 1988, which granted a formal apology and reparations to Japanese Americans interned during World War 2, with a $20,000 US payout to all survivors. However, these reparations and the subsequent apology did not pertain to non-U.S. citizens and legal permanent residents who were deported to the United States from Latin America.

Because the law was restricted to American citizens, and to legal permanent residents, ethnic Japanese who had been taken from their homes in Latin America (mostly from Peru), were not covered in the reparations, regardless of whether they had remained in the United States, had returned to Latin America, or had been deported to Japan after the war. In 1996, Carmen Mochizuki filed a class-action lawsuit, and, from what was left of the funds from the CLA, won a settlement of around $5,000 per person for those who were eligible. One hundred and forty-five of those affected were able to receive the $5,000 settlement before funds ran out. In 1999, funds were approved for the US Attorney General to pay compensation to the remaining claimants.

To this day, no formal apology has ever been issued to Germans deported from Latin America.
