= Italian Guatemalans =

Guatemalan citizens of Italian descent

Italo-guatemaltechi (Italian) Ítalo-guatemaltecos (Spanish)
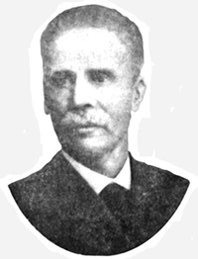
- Italian Guatemalan Alejandro Sinibaldi, President of Guatemala in 1885

Total population
- c. 4,000 (by birth)

Regions with significant populations
- Guatemala city, Quetzaltenango and Zacapa

Languages
- Guatemalan Spanish · Italian and Italian dialects

Religion
- Roman Catholicism and Protestantism

Related ethnic groups
- Italians, Italian Americans, Italian Argentines, Italian Bolivians, Italian Brazilians, Italian Canadians, Italian Chileans, Italian Colombians, Italian Costa Ricans, Italian Cubans, Italian Dominicans, Italian Ecuadorians, Italian Haitians, Italian Hondurans, Italian Mexicans, Italian Panamanians, Italian Paraguayans, Italian Peruvians, Italian Puerto Ricans, Italian Salvadorans, Italian Uruguayans, Italian Venezuelans

Italian Guatemalans (Italian: italo-guatemaltechi; Spanish: ítalo-guatemaltecos) are Guatemalan-born citizens who are fully or partially of Italian descent, whose ancestors were Italians who emigrated to Guatemala during the Italian diaspora, or Italian-born people in Guatemala. Italians contributed in the construction of the country as monuments, parks and besides contributing at the National Conservatory.

== History ==
The Italian immigration in Guatemala began in a consistent way only in the early Republican era. One of the first Italians to come to Guatemala was Geronimo Mancinelli, an Italian coffee farmer who lived in San Marcos (Guatemala) in 1847. However, the first wave of Italian immigrants came in 1873, under the government of Justo Rufino Barrios, these immigrants were mostly farmers attracted by the wealth of natural and spacious highlands of Guatemala. Most of them settled in Quetzaltenango and Guatemala City.

=== First migration ===
During colonial centuries only a few Italians came to what is now Guatemala, mostly religious missionaries with some merchants and a few soldiers under Spanish rule.

Vincenzo Filisola occupies Guatemala on behalf of Agustín de Iturbide and ordered to proclaim its independence in 1823; the general Francisco Morazán, of Italian roots, was the second President of the Guatemala Republic.

— Patricia Spinato

The Italian Vincenzo Filisola (born in Ravello, Italy, in 1789) occupied Guatemala City in 1823 after the formation of the "Federal Republic of Central America" (that included Guatemala) and convened the "Central American congress" which forthwith declared its independence.

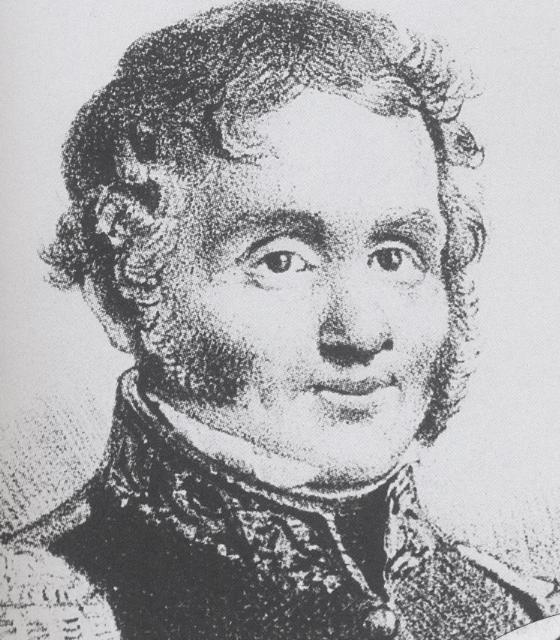
Vincenzo Filisola

Filisola was followed by a small group of Italians, who emigrated from Italy to Guatemala in the first half of the 19th century.

One of the first Italians to come to Guatemala was Geronimo Mancinelli, an Italian coffee farmer who lived in San Marcos (Guatemala) in 1847.

Indeed, the first "wave" of Italian immigrants came in 1873, under the government of Justo Rufino Barrios, who made a trip to Europe. He was greatly interested in Italian families to bring to his country: these families had surnames as Bocaletti, Garzaro, Bonnato, Maselli, Comparini and were mostly farmers attracted by the wealth of natural and spacious highlands of Guatemala. Most of them settled in Quetzaltenango and Guatemala City.

However, there were also a few hundreds of Italians from Veneto and Tuscany, who were left without help by their immigration agents after they arrived in the Santo Tomás de Castilla port: some died of yellow fever and malaria, which were endemic to the region, but most moved away by 1878.

It is noteworthy to pinpoint that when Barrios was killed in April 1885 in El Salvador, Alessandro Sinibaldi became President of Guatemala for some time even if he was born in Rome in 1814: his father was a wealthy Italian immigrant.

=== Second and prosperous Italian colony ===
As the first Italian colony failure for lack of incentives. In early 1880, came another wave of Italian immigrants, within the government of Justo Rufino Barrios. This wave of immigrants was different from the previous one, since they arrived in this scientific, writers, painters, sculptors, musicians and wealthy families.

By 1900, there were more than 1,000 Italians in Guatemala, sculptors Italians (under the government of Manuel Estrada Cabrera), built many historical buildings in Guatemala. This occurred in certain areas of Quetzaltenango, Zacapa and Guatemala City was inhabited mostly by Italians, which was a growth of Italo-Guatemalan children, Among these years, prosperity was in the Italian colonies of Quetzaltenango, Guatemala City and Zacapa, for the years 1930, Guatemala reached its maximum number of Italian residents, the second country in Central America, behind Costa Rica. And according to historian Vittorio Capelli, also there were important immigrations in Panama and Nicaragua and some immigrations in El Salvador and Honduras.

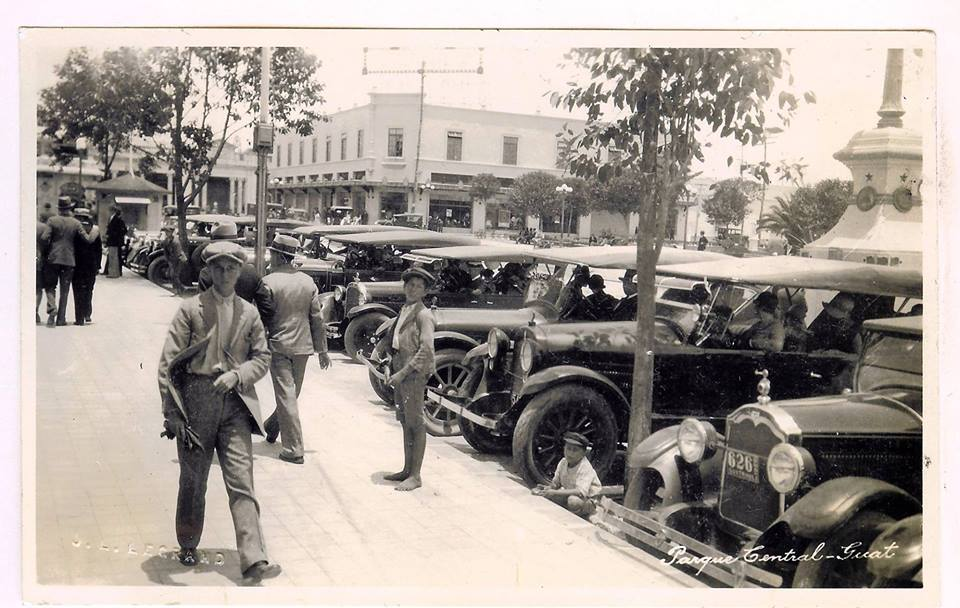
Italians in the central park of Guatemala City (1900).

The Italians were pioneers in bringing European technology in Guatemala (along with the Germans), the first driver throughout Guatemalan history was Dante Naninni, descendant of Italian drivers. He was also member of the Italian Air Force during The World War II. In the late 1890s, the first cars arrived in Guatemala were of Italian origin, besides the decades between 1870s and 1900s, the Italians built the railway (El Ferrocarril de los Altos).

During this migration, the Italian influence came to the Guatemalan literature, mainly in the late nineteenth century, many indigenous literature of the colonial period was translated by Italian writers. Other writings of Italians in Guatemala reflected the natural and tropical beauty of the country. The Italian editors Aliprandi and Martini painted a vivid picture of the Guatemala's Italian community in 1932.

By mid-1930, Italian immigrants were the second largest immigrant group in Guatemala after the Germans, however, unlike the Germans, the Italians never exceeded 10,000 immigrants in Guatemala, and the growing Nazi influence in Guatemala by the Germans, this rest importance to the Italian community by the government, which the prosperity of this colony came to an end.

From this period came the pioneers of the era that gave Guatemala a true socio-economic transformation: the decorators Lutti, Degrandi, Bernasconi, Carmennauti, Scoteti; the sculptor Andrew Gaileitti; the famous architect Porta, who left magnificent works in Quetzaltenango, such as the famous "Pasaje Enriquez"; the doctor Zagrini, a physician and surgeon; the lawyer Julio Drago; the engineers Vittorio Cottone, Enrico Invernizzio and Luigi Paiella, who plotted the Paseo de la Reforma Racetrack, Boulevard Aurora and Elena Avenue.

It is noteworthy to pinpoint that the father & mother of Riccardo Bressani, an italo-guatemalan scientist, came to Guatemala from Italy in this period. Riccardo Bressani was the first scientist to receive the award of the worldwide prestigious Albert Einstein World Award of Science in 1984.

By early 1900s, Italian immigrants were an important immigrant group in Guatemala after the Germans, however, unlike the Germans, the Italians never exceeded 5,000 immigrants in Guatemala in any year.

=== Contemporary migration ===
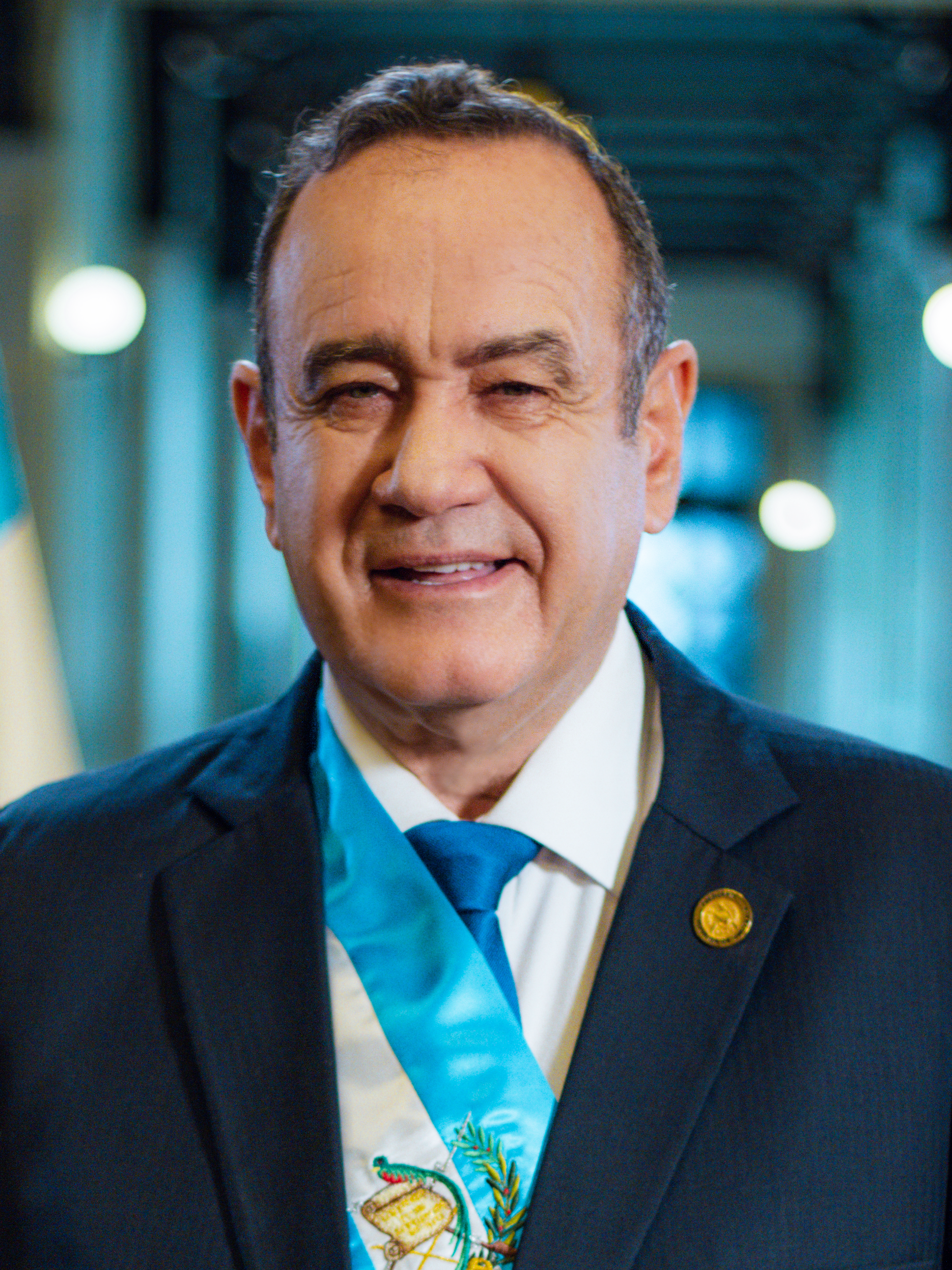
Alejandro Giammattei, President of Guatemala from 2020

The last wave of Italian immigration in Guatemala took place under President Manuel Estrada Cabrera, who wanted to follow the footsteps of his predecessors and led a third emigration of Italian families into Guatemala. In part it succeeded because, by then, the country was a dictatorship. Many came in this period, while some Italians who had arrived under the presidency of Reyna Barrios Barrios left; however, some new contributions came from Italian blood, who put their work and skills at the service of the Guatemalan nation. Among these may be mentioned: Valentine Giordani, Juan Mini and Humberto & Luis Giordani, who worked in the construction of railways and the building of modern houses.

By early 1940s, Italian immigrants were the second largest immigrant group in Guatemala after the Germans. But with the growing Nazi influence in Guatemala by the Germans, the government started to reduce & limit the importance to the Italian community (linked partially to Fascism) and the huge prosperity & influence of this colony came to an end during WW2.

Some of the 51 Italians of Guatemala who were inscribed in the "Partito fascista" were jailed (but they were a small minority in the more than two thousand Italians living in Guatemala city).

In the 1950s some emigration from Italy, mainly from Calabria and Sicily, was again arriving in Guatemala, but this migration was limited to a few hundreds.

In 2020 was elected President of Guatemala Alejandro Giammattei, whose grandfather came from Italy in the 1930s. He has the double passport (Italian and Guatemalan) because of this ancestor.

== Demography ==
There were around 4,000 Italian citizens, which makes it the country's third largest European community. Since 2007 the institution "Internations Guatemala" is in charge of incorporating more foreign residents into Guatemalan culture, including those who are Italian.

== Architecture ==
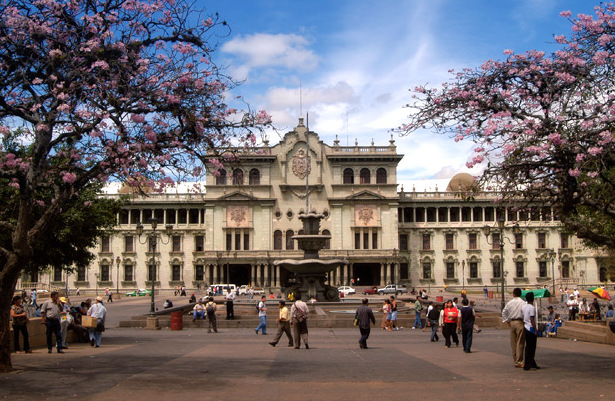
The Guatemala National Palace was built in the government of Jorge Ubico, and performed with various Italian designs, owing to the Italian influence in the country

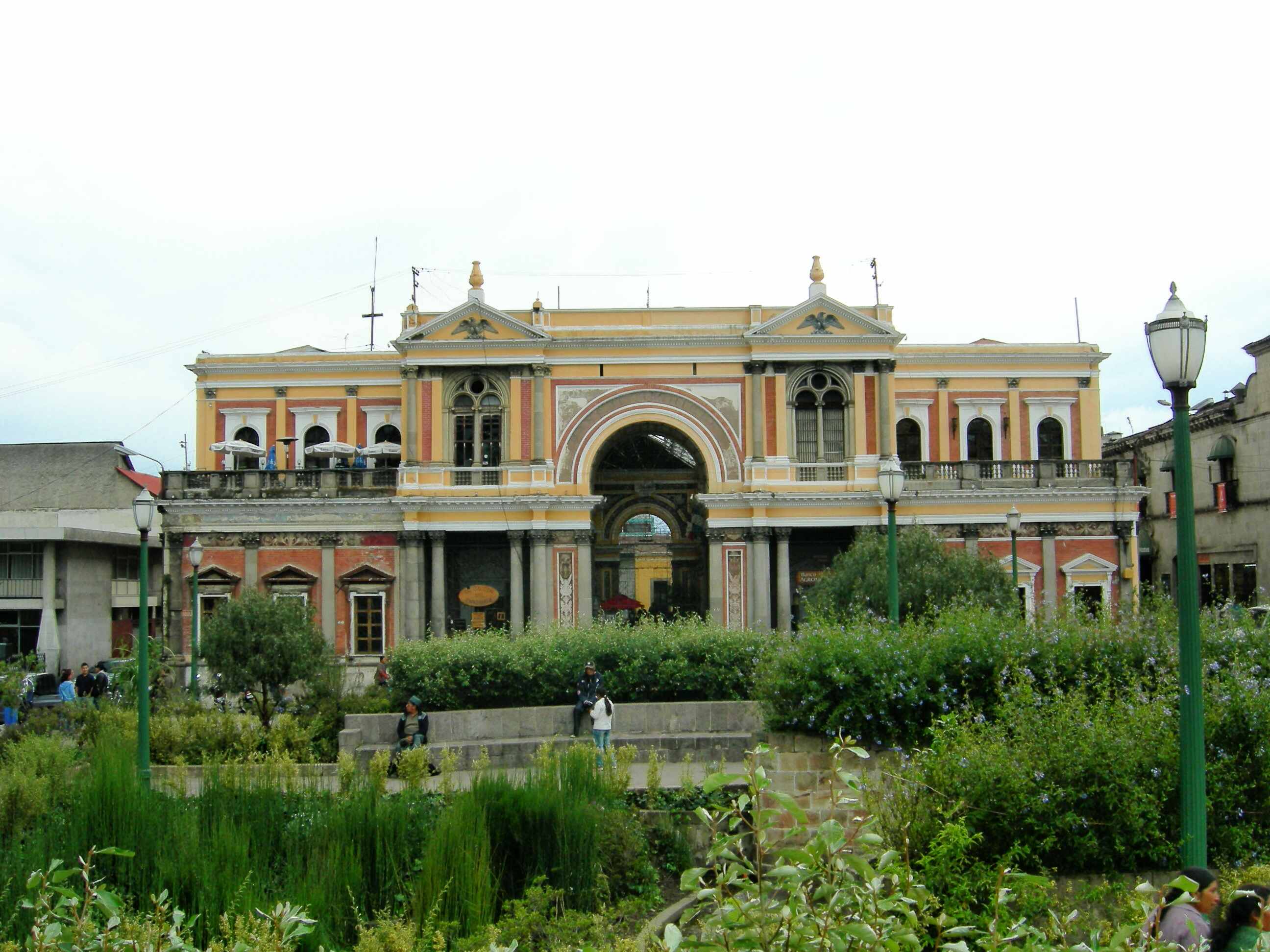
Pasaje Enríquez, Quetzaltenango, by Italian architect Alberto Porta

A number of Italian architects arrived in Guatemala towards the end of the 19th century, giving rise to an Italian-influenced art and architectural movement, particularly in the capital, and several Italian architects oversaw construction projects in Quetzaltenango; these included the Templo de Logia Fénix No. 2, by Alberto Porta.

A group of Italian architects, including Porta and Luigi Lutti, with sculptor Desiderio Scotti, founded the Academy of Municipal Architecture, and were responsible for building many of the most prominent buildings in Quetzaltenango, including the Banco del Occidente and Pasaje Enríquez.

== Notable Italian Guatemalans ==
- Alejandro M. Sinibaldi, President of Guatemala in 1885.
- Stefano Cincotta, is a Guatemalan footballer who plays for Germany.
- Juan Jose Gerardi Conedera, was a Guatemalan Roman Catholic bishop and human rights defender.
- Marco Pappa, is a Guatemalan footballer who plays for the MLS club Seattle Sounders FC. He is a member of the Guatemala national team.
- Dwight Pezzarossi, is a retired professional football forward who last played for Comunicaciones in the Liga Nacional de Guatemala.
- Ricardo Bressani, scientist inventor of the incaparina.
- Alaíde Foppa, women poet, writer, feminist, art critic, teacher and translator.
- Roxana Baldetti, first female Vice President of Guatemala (2012 to 2015).
- Magda Bianchi Lázzari, diplomat, activist, and the former First Lady of Guatemala from 1991 until 1993.
- Belo Cipriani, writer, publisher, and entrepreneur.
- Sergio Custodio, professor, writer and Humanist dedicated to Philosophy.
- Ana Fagianni de Maldonado, diplomat, activist, and the former First Lady of Guatemala from 2015 until 2016.
- Alejandro Giammattei, President of Guatemala from 2020.
- Marcela Giammattei, politician and lawyer serving as current First Lady of Guatemala.

== See also ==
- Immigration to Guatemala
