= Rodolfo Dieseldorff =

First German to arrive in Guatemala

Rodolfo Dieseldorff (Born in the mid-19th century, died in the 1940s) was the first German to arrive in Guatemala, around 1863, brought new influences and notable changes in the commercial and architectural culture of the place. After the sending a letter to Germany, provoked a wave of Germans to Guatemala. Later he invite his whole family to live in Guatemala. At the end of his long career by sea, Rodolfo Dieseldorff chosen as the target Gualán, Zacapa. He experimented with the cultivation of cotton, but the plagues lost his crop. This forced him to seek other routes and started a new project in the trade, which led to Alta Verapaz, where he settled. The descendants of this family still have several fincas in Alta Verapaz where coffee is still grown.

== See also ==
- German Guatemalan
