= Italian Dominicans =

Dominicans citizens of Italian descent

Italo-dominicani (Italian) Ítalo-dominicanos (Spanish)
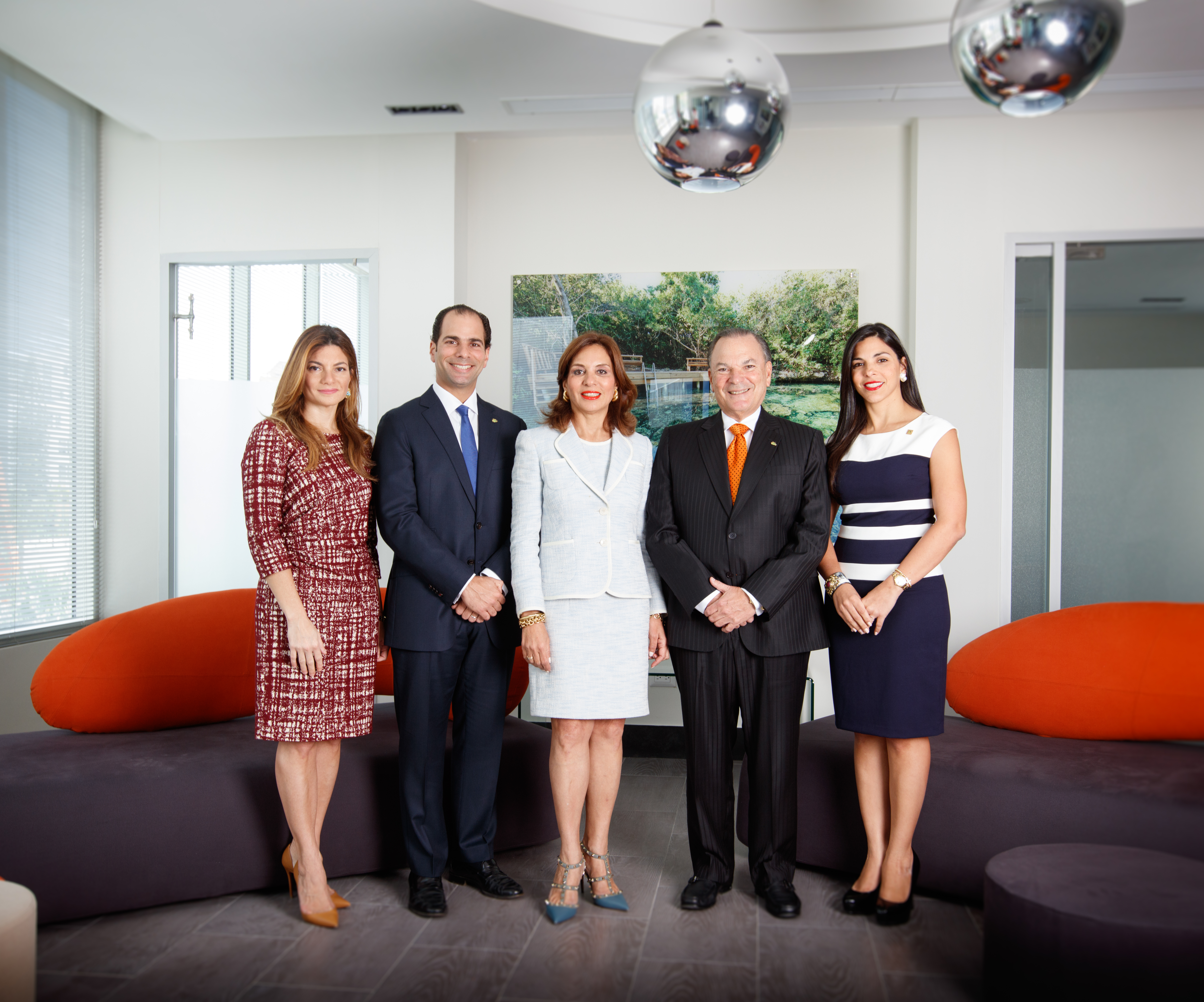
- Dominicans of Italian descent, businessman Frank Rainieri with his family.

Total population
- c. 50,000 (by birth) c. 380,000 (by ancestry, corresponding to about 4% of the total population)

Regions with significant populations
- Boca Chica, Santiago de los Caballeros, La Romana and Santo Domingo

Languages
- Dominican Spanish · Italian and Italian dialects

Religion
- Roman Catholic

Related ethnic groups
- Italians, Italian Americans, Italian Argentines, Italian Bolivians, Italian Brazilians, Italian Canadians, Italian Chileans, Italian Colombians, Italian Costa Ricans, Italian Cubans, Italian Ecuadorians, Italian Guatemalans, Italian Haitians, Italian Hondurans, Italian Mexicans, Italian Panamanians, Italian Paraguayans, Italian Peruvians, Italian Puerto Ricans, Italian Salvadorans, Italian Uruguayans, Italian Venezuelans

Italian Dominicans (Italian: italo-dominicani; Spanish: ítalo-dominicanos) are Dominican-born citizens who are fully or partially of Italian descent, whose ancestors were Italians who emigrated to the Dominican Republic during the Italian diaspora, or Italian-born people in the Dominican Republic. The Italian community in the Dominican Republic, considering both people of Italian ancestry and Italian birth, is the largest in the Caribbean region.

== History ==
There were a few hundred Italians who moved to live in "Santo Domingo" (as the Dominican Republic was then called), in the first centuries after the discovery of America in 1492. Most were religious, adventurers and traders.

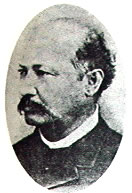
Francisco Gregorio Billini, President of the Dominican Republic in 1884–85, was an Italian Dominican with grandparents from Ravenna.

The turbulent years of Dominican independence even had a Dominican president whose ancestors came from Ravenna—Francisco Gregorio Billini. Indeed, Billini was president between 1884 and 1885, and gave his resignation early after refusing to limit the freedom of the press.

At the end of the 19th century, the sugar industry produced much of wealth on the Caribbean island and attracted several hundred Italians who settled mainly in the capital Santo Domingo and its surroundings, such as La Romana.

Italian Dominicans have left its mark on the history of the Caribbean country. The foundation of the oldest Dominican newspaper in 1889 was the work of an Italian, while the establishment of the Navy of the Dominican Republic was the work of the Genoese merchant Juan Bautista Cambiaso, né Giuseppe Giovanni Battista Cambiaso. Finally, the design of the Palace of the President of the Dominican Republic, both aesthetically and structurally, was the work of an Italian engineer, Guido D'Alessandro.

In 2010, Dominicans of Italian descent numbered around 380,000 (corresponding to about 4% of the total population of the Dominican Republic), while Italian citizens residing in the Caribbean nation numbered around 50,000, mainly concentrated in Boca Chica, Santiago de los Caballeros, La Romana and in the capital Santo Domingo. The Italian community in the Dominican Republic, considering both people of Italian ancestry and Italian birth, is the largest in the Caribbean region.

== Notable Italian Dominicans ==
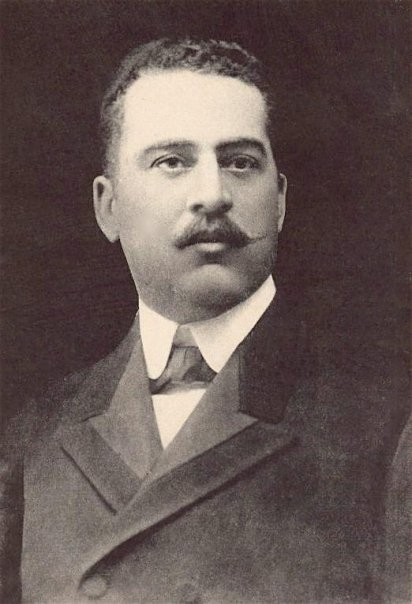
Carlos Morales Languasco, President of the Dominican Republic in 1903-1905

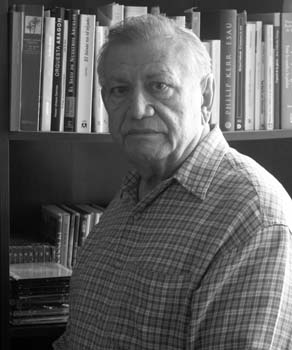
Marcio Veloz Maggiolo

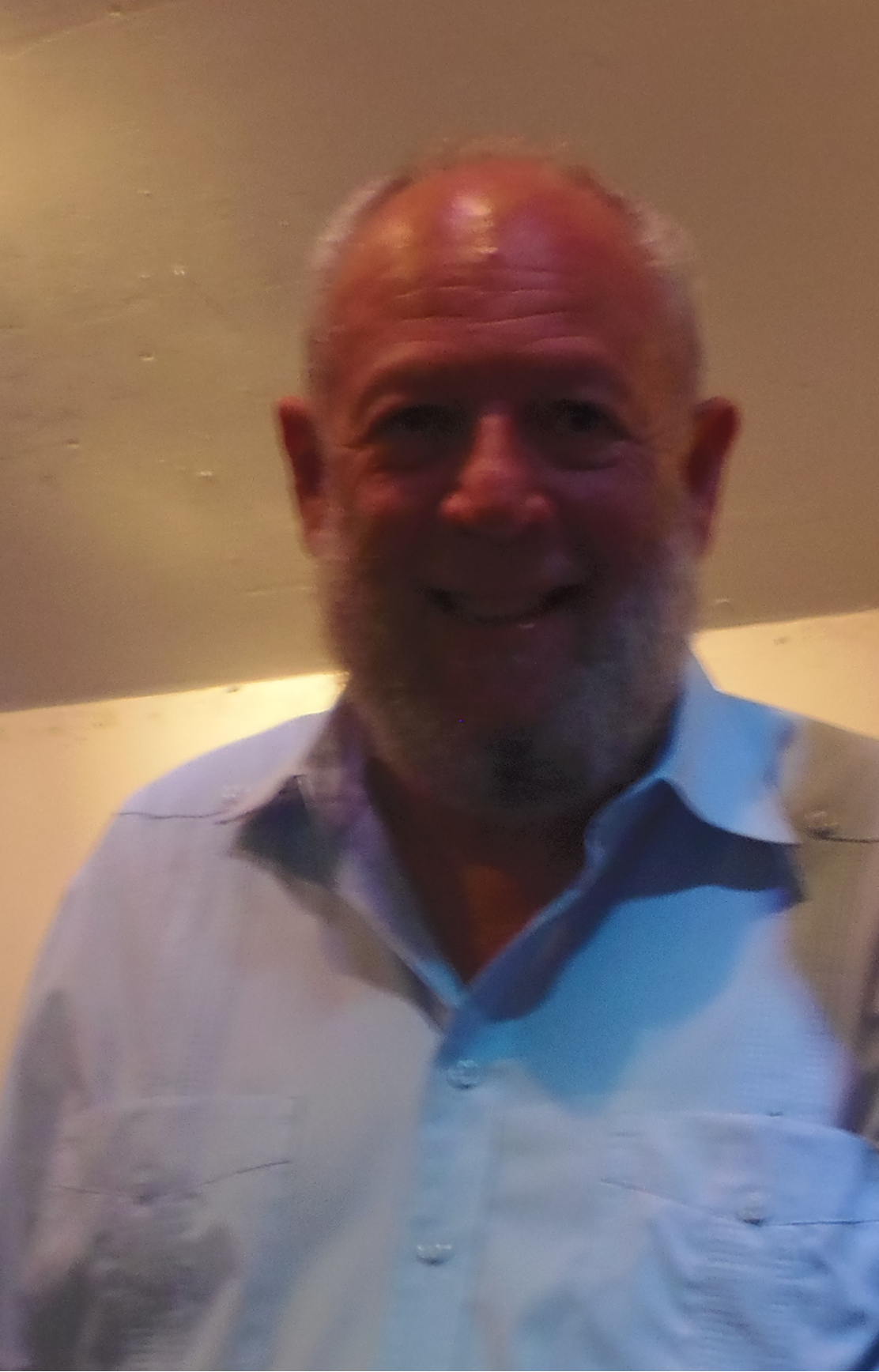
Freddy Ginebra

- Luis Álvarez Renta, economist
- Federico Antún Batlle, politician and civil engineer
- Alessandro Baroni, footballer
- Poppy Bermúdez, businessman
- Francisco Gregorio Billini, writer, pedagogue, and politician
- Joe Blandino, singer-songwriter, musician, and actor
- José Miguel Bonetti, businessman
- Ligia Bonetti, businesswoman
- Pedro Francisco Bonó, politician, sociologist and intellectual
- Pedro Borrell, architect and archeologist
- Andrea Bosco, footballer
- José María Cabral, director, screenwriter, and producer
- Manuel del Cabral, poet, writer, and diplomat
- Peggy Cabral, journalist, television host, politician and diplomat
- Niní Cáffaro, singer
- Juan Bautista Cambiaso, explorer, admiral and sailor
- Tito Canepa, painter
- Miguel Cocco, businessman and politician
- Luis Colón, 1st Duke of Veragua, governor
- Bartholomew Columbus, explorer
- Diego Columbus, navigator and explorer
- José del Castillo Saviñón, lawyer, business and politician
- Manuel Díez Cabral, businessman and entrepreneurial leader
- Ulises Francisco Espaillat, politician
- Larimar Fiallo, beauty pageant titleholder
- Pedro Florentino, army officer
- Miguel Franjul, author and editor
- José Gabriel García, army officer, historian, politician, journalist and publisher
- Freddy Ginebra, cultural agent, writer and journalist
- Alejandro Grullón, banker and businessman
- Manuel Alejandro Grullón, businessman
- Sarah Jorge León, actress, writer and producer
- Dulcita Lieggi, actress, model and beauty pageant title-holder
- Geremy Lombardi, footballer
- Lisandro Macarrulla, businessman and entrepreneurial leader
- Charlie Mariotti, politician, manager, and broadcaster
- Celso Marranzini, economist and businessman
- Nomar Mazara, baseball right fielder
- Fabian Messina, footballer
- Carlos Morales Languasco, priest, politician and military figure.
- Gabriel Núñez, footballer
- Panky, actor, film producer, writer, radio and TV host, announcer, and singer
- Arturo Pellerano Alfau, merchant, publisher, and journalist
- Roddy Pérez, film and music producer, director, actor and scriptwriter
- Max Puig, politician
- Fernando Rainieri, tourism entrepreneur and politician
- Rosalina Santoro, footballer
- Antonio Santurro, footballer
- Juana Saviñón, volleyball player
- Francesca Segarelli, tennis player
- Gianluigi Sueva, footballer
- Julio Vega Batlle, writer and a diplomat
- Bernardo Vega, academic and politician
- Marcio Veloz Maggiolo, writer, archaeologist and anthropologist
- Juan Bautista Vicini Burgos, politician
- Juan Bautista Vicini Cabral, businessman
- Jonathan Villar, baseball second baseman

== See also ==
- Dominican Republic–Italy relations
- Italian diaspora

== Bibliography ==
- Favero, Luigi; Tassello, Graziano. Cent'anni di emigrazione italiana (1861 - 1961). CSER. Roma, 1981. (In Italian)
