= Marranzini =

Marranzini is a surname. Notable people with the surname include:

- Celso Marranzini (born 1952), Dominican economist and businessman
- Fernando Rainieri Marranzini (1940–2015), Dominican businessman, politician, and diplomat
- Frank Rainieri Marranzini (born 1945), Italian-born Dominican businessman
- Mary Pérez de Marranzini (1926–2025), Dominican philanthropist
