= Bonetti =

Bonetti is a surname. Notable people with the surname include:

== Arts and entertainment ==
- Antonio Bonetti (1710–1787), Italian painter
- David Bonetti (c. 1947–2018), American art critic
- Massimo Bonetti (born 1951), Italian actor and director
- Mattia Bonetti (born 1952), Paris-based artist and designer
- Uberto Bonetti (1909–1993), Italian designer of the Aeropittura movement

== Business ==
- Ligia Consuelo Bonetti Dubreil or Ligia Bonetti de Valiente (born 1968), Dominican businesswoman
- José Miguel Bonetti (born 1938), chairman of Grupo Sociedad Industrial Dominicana

== Government and politics ==
- Addo Bonetti (1926–2021), American politician
- Andrea Bonetti (born 1946), Italian politician of Democrazia Cristiana
- Gianfranco Facco-Bonetti (born 1940), Italian diplomat

== Religion ==
- Augusto Bonetti (1835–1904), Italian Catholic archbishop
- Eugenia Bonetti (active 21st century), Italian nun rescuing women from prostitution

== Sports and games ==
- Alessandro Bonetti (born 1985), Italian racing driver
- Américo Bonetti (1928–1999), Argentine boxer
- Dario Bonetti (born 1961), Italian football manager and player
- Ivano Bonetti (born 1964), Italian football manager and player
- Julio Bonetti (1911–1952), American baseball player
- Peter Bonetti (1941–2020), English footballer
- Sébastien Bonetti (born 1977), French rugby union player
- Simon Bonetti (born 1977), Australian rugby league footballer
- Tatiana Bonetti (born 1991), Italian football striker
- Vera Bonetti (born 1964), retired Brazilian female volleyball player

== Other ==
- Benjamin Bonetti (born 1982), English author of self-help books
- Guido Bonetti (or Bonatti; died c. 1300), Italian mathematician, astronomer and astrologer
- Mario Bonetti (1888–1961), Italian admiral during World War II

== See also ==
- Tequila and Bonetti, American television series
- Boni (disambiguation)
- Bonatti
- Abisso Bonetti, Karst cave in the municipality of Doberdò del Lago (Gorizia, Friuli-Venezia Giulia, Italy)
