= Italian Panamanians =

Panamanian citizens of Italian descent

Italo-panamensi (Italian) Ítalo-panameños (Spanish)
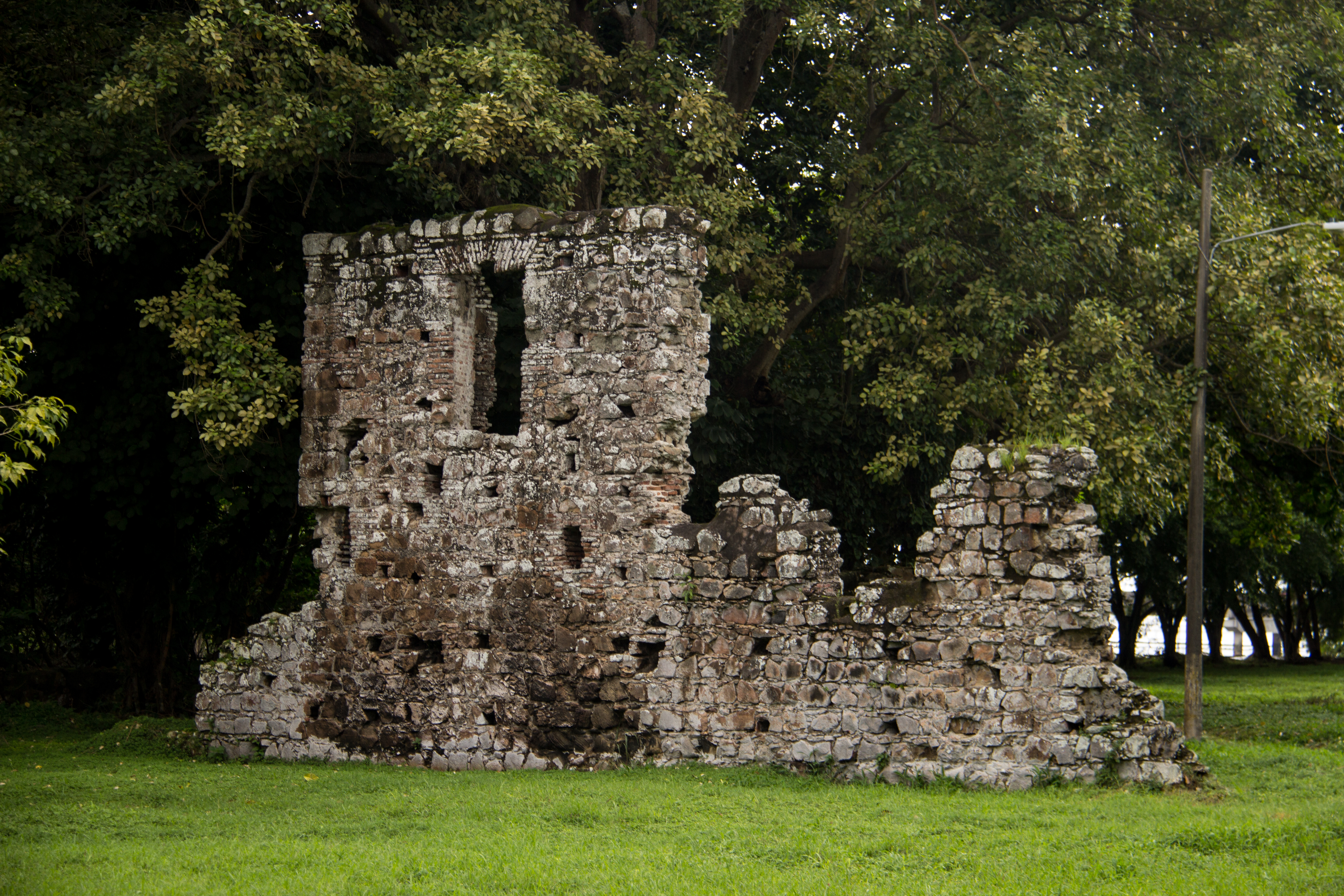
- The "Casa de los Genoveses" (house of Genoans) in Panama Viejo

Total population
- c. 3,700 (by birth) c. 100,000 (by ancestry)

Regions with significant populations
- Panama City

Languages
- Panamanian Spanish · Italian and Italian dialects

Religion
- Roman Catholicism

Related ethnic groups
- Italians, Italian Americans, Italian Argentines, Italian Bolivians, Italian Brazilians, Italian Canadians, Italian Chileans, Italian Colombians, Italian Costa Ricans, Italian Cubans, Italian Dominicans, Italian Ecuadorians, Italian Guatemalans, Italian Haitians, Italian Hondurans, Italian Mexicans, Italian Paraguayans, Italian Peruvians, Italian Puerto Ricans, Italian Salvadorans, Italian Uruguayans, Italian Venezuelans

Italian Panamanians (Italian: italo-panamensi; Spanish: ítalo-panameños) are Panamanian-born citizens who are fully or partially of Italian descent, whose ancestors were Italians who emigrated to Panama during the Italian diaspora, or Italian-born people in Panama. Italian Panamanians are mainly descendant of Italians attracted by the construction of the Panama Canal, between the 19th and 20th century.

== History ==
The history of Italian immigrants in Panama begins from 1510, when several Italian citizens decided to emigrate to Panama City founded by Pedrarias Davila.

From 1520 some Genoese merchants ruled the commerce of Old Panama (Panamá Viejo) on the Pacific Ocean for a century, thanks to a concession given by the Spaniards, who had the Republic of Genoa as allies.

Between 1596 and 1597 already there were 11 Italians in Panama, for naturalization and the right to stay in Panama. According to a census around 1607, Panama City had 548 inhabitants (some of them descendants of the first Genoese settlers), of whom 53 were foreigners and of these 18 were Italians, 6 of which were domiciled by the composition of foreigners.

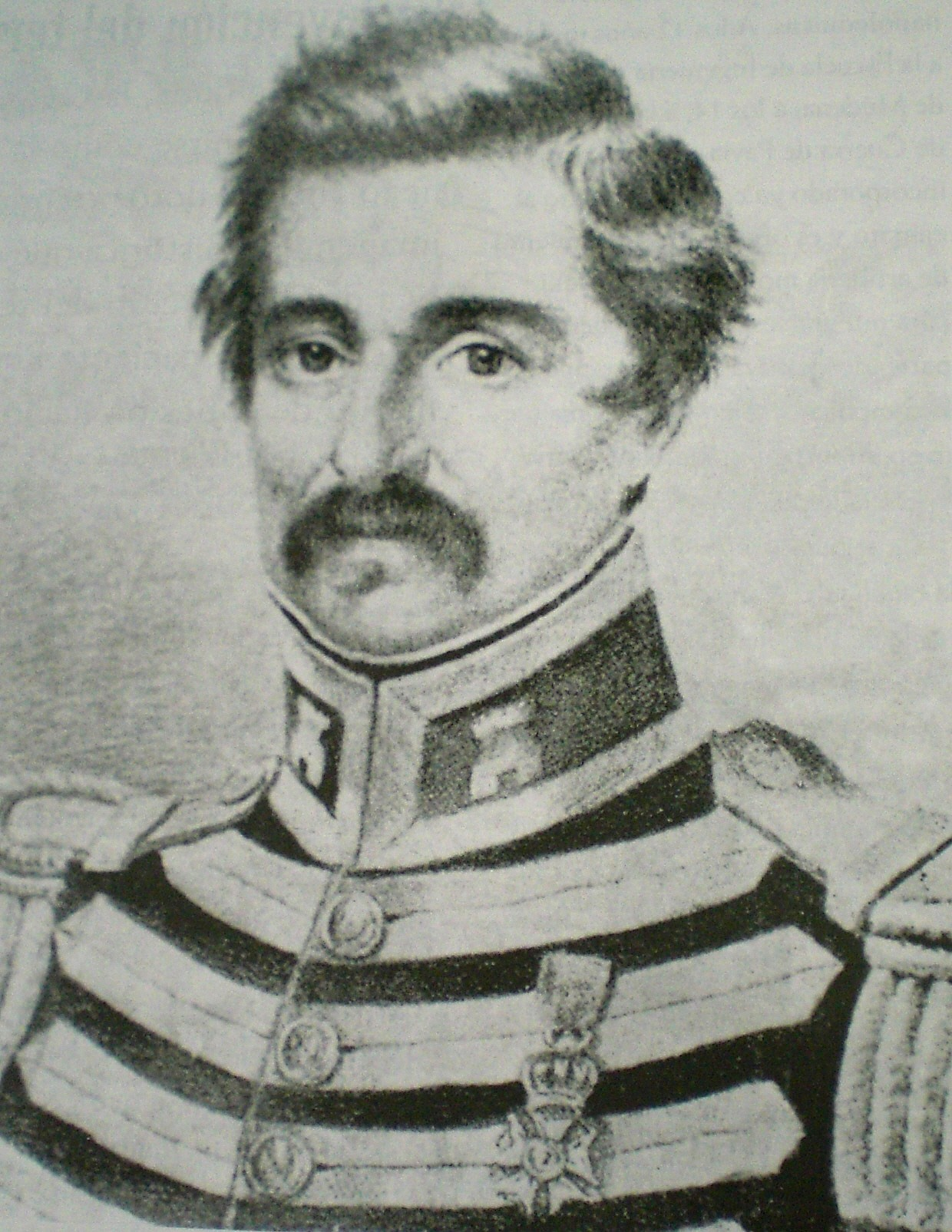
Agostino Codazzi

After de independence, the Italian presence continued to emphasize immigrants such as Agostino Codazzi and Napoleone Garella, who in the nineteenth century and at different times, performed studies that recommended Panama as the ideal for the construction of an interoceanic canal. Meanwhile, in 1844, Garella was the first engineer assigned by the French government to find a route for the construction of the Canal and in his studies recommended the route of the isthmus of Panama over the routes suggested by the isthmus of Tehuantepec and Nicaragua. During the isthmus canal project and construction continued to arrive eminent Italians from scientists, artists, priests and merchants to craftsmen and laborers. They founded families whose descendants were quickly integrated the dynamic process of formation of the Panamanian nationality. One was elected President of Panama in 1949 and 1960: Roberto Francisco Chiari Remón (March 2, 1905, in Panama City – March 1, 1981) was the President of Panama in 1949 and later from 1960 to 1964. He belonged to the Liberal Party. In the 1920s even his father (Rodolfo Chiari) was president.

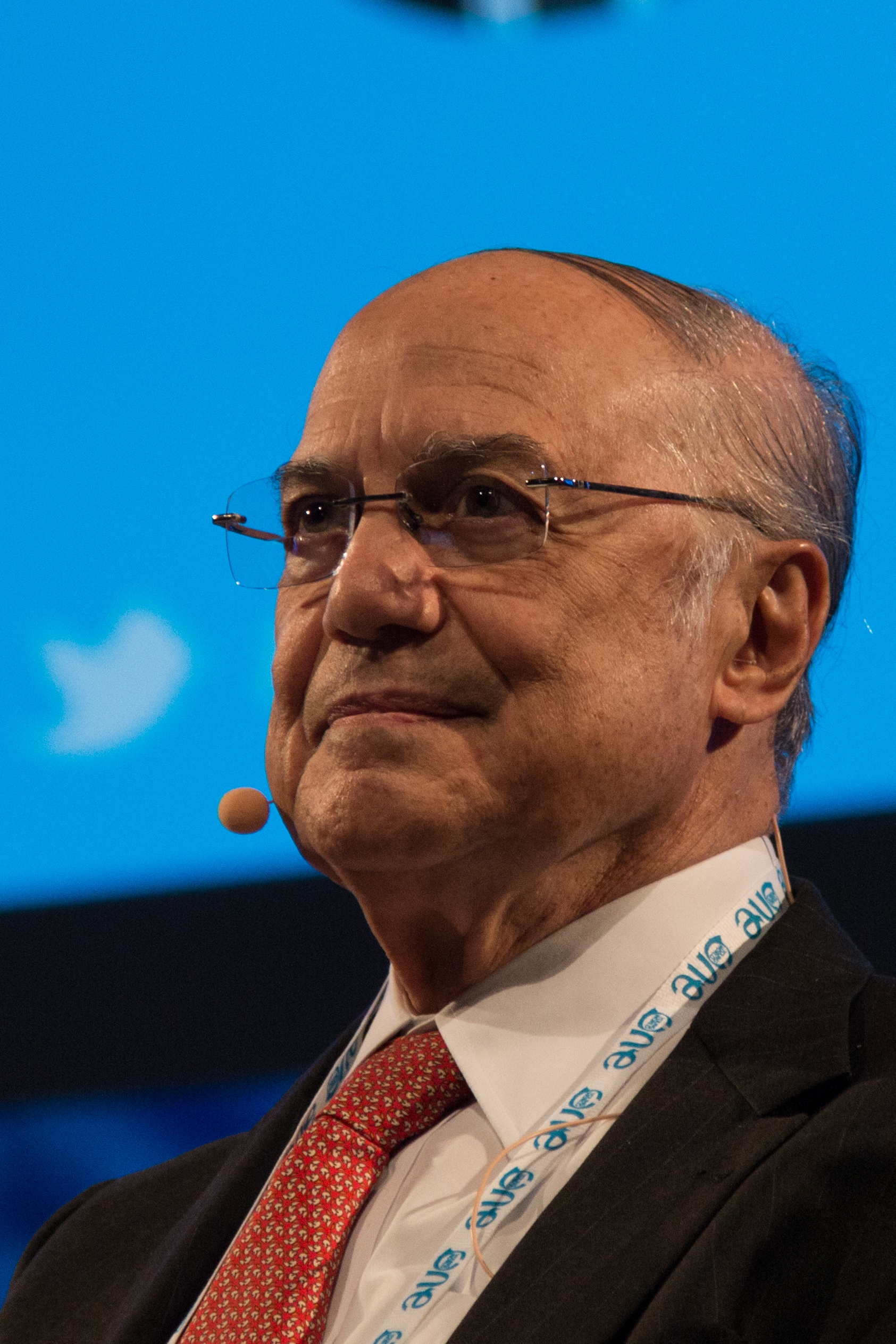
The Italian Panamanian Nicolás Ardito Barletta Vallarino, President of Panama in 1984-1985

The wave of Italian immigration occurred around 1880. With the construction of the Canal by the Universal Panama Canal Company came the arrival of up to 2,000 Italians. Two years later in 1882, at the initiative of Mr. Oreste Badio (a prominent member of the Italian colony), the "Italian Benevolent Society" was established in order to help the countrymen affected by disease or who needed some kind of help, with an initial membership of 37 persons.

To this migration belongs the ancestors of another Panamanian president: Nicolás Ardito Barletta Vallarino (born August 21, 1938, in Aguadulce, in the province of Coclé) was President of Panama from October 11, 1984, to September 28, 1985. The President Barletta Vallarino belonged to the Democratic Revolutionary Party (PRD).

Ricardo Martinelli served as president from 2009 through 2014, during which time the Panamanian economy grew robustly and steadily. His achievements were even lauded by The Economist: "Though it lies in Central America, the poorest and most violent region in the West, the country’s 3.6m citizens are now richer than most Latin Americans."

Indeed, Martinelli - during his five-year presidential mandate - promoted a large urban development of Panama City, with the construction of some of the tallest skyscrapers in Latin America. Another Italo-Panamanian, Alberto Motta, has created companies in Panama and with a "Fundacion" is helping the poorest Panamanians.

Since 1966 there has been in effect the Panama-Italy Treaty Visa (based on the 1966 Treaty of Friendship, Commerce, and Navigation) that facilitates Italian immigration to Panama for economic purposes. Currently there were over 21,000 Panamanians of Italian descent, while there were around 3,700 Italian citizens.

However, according to the Italian Embassy in 2017 the Italian residents were nearly 3900, while about 10% of Panama inhabitants are white (of whom nearly one fourth are descendants of Italians). In other words: of the total population of Panama that was of about 4 million in that year, approximately 400,000 were white and the descendants of Italians were nearly 100,000 (if calculated also those who were descendants from colonial times).

== Notable Italian Panamanians ==
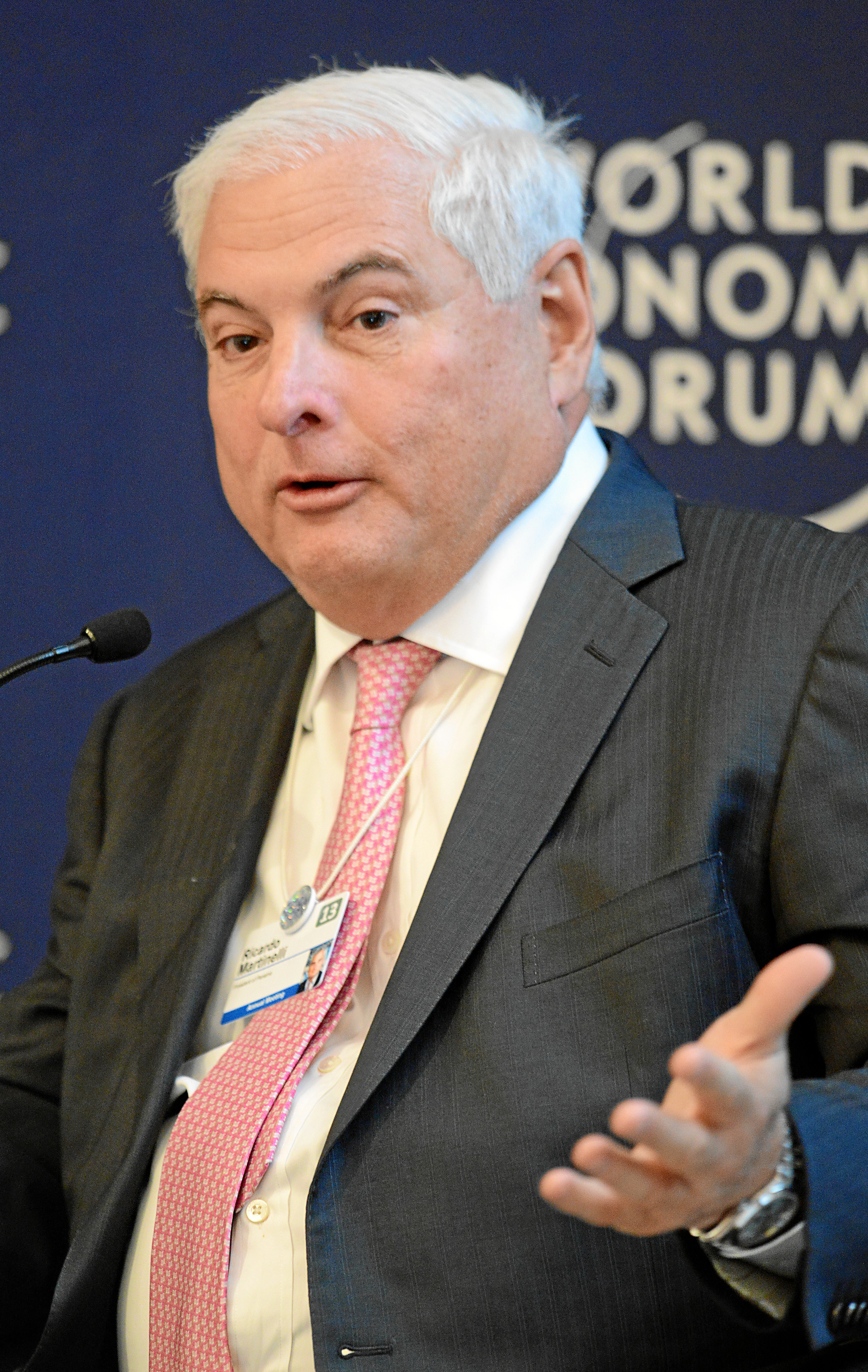
The Italian Panamanian Ricardo Martinelli, President of Panama in 2009-2014

- Rodolfo Chiari, President of Panama in 1924-1928
- Roberto Francisco Chiari Remón, President of Panama in 1949 and in 1960-1964
- Nicolás Ardito Barletta Vallarino, President of Panama in 1984-1985
- Ricardo Martinelli, President of Panama in 2009-2014
- Miguel Bosé, singer and actor
- Elida Campodónico, teacher, women's rights advocate and attorney
- Giosue Cozzarelli, model and YouTube celebrity
- Valerio de Sanctis de Ferrari, businessman and politician
- Moisés Giroldi, military commander
- Hugo Spadafora, physician and guerrilla fighter
- Sage Steele, television anchor

== Bibliography ==
- Cappelli, Vittorio. Nelle altre Americhe. Calabresi in Colombia, Panamà, Costa Rica e Guatemala. La Mongolfiera Ed. Doria di Cassano Jonio, 2004.
- English, Peter. Panama in Pictures. Lerner Publishing Group. London, 1989 ISBN 978-0-8225-1818-1

== See also ==
- Italian diaspora
