= Rainieri =

Rainieri is a surname. Notable people with the surname include:

- Fernando Rainieri (1940–2015), Dominican businessman, politician, and diplomat
- Frank Rainieri (born 1945), Italian-born Dominican businessman
- Rainerius, patron saint of Pisa

== See also ==
- Ranieri
