= Francesco Federico Falco =

- Born: 12 April 1866; Penne, Italy
- Died: 11 August 1944 (aged 78); Livorno, Italy
- Occupations: Doctor, writer, diplomat, military
- Years active: 1887–1936

Francesco Federico Falco (April 12, 1866 – August 11, 1944) was an Italian medical doctor, who fought for the Cuban War of Independence as coronel "commander of the Health Corp in the Liberation Army of Cuba".

== Biography ==
Falco graduated from Medical school in Rome. Initially he was a follower of Giuseppe Mazzini and began his political activity in 1887 as a member of Mazzini's Republican Party. By the end of the year, he started to adopt a socialist position. As a journalist, he wrote in "L'Emancipazione di Roma" in 1888, and successively in "La Tribuna", "Il Messaggero", "La Scintilla" and "Il Popolo toscano".

in April 1898, a group of 75 Italian volunteers sailed to Cuba with some money obtained from subscription in Italy: their leader was colonel Francesco Federico Falco, who fought bravely under general Antonio Maceo and was named "commander" of the Health Corp in the Liberation Army of Cuba. Falco later founded the magazine “La Cultura Latina” in La Habana, the first literary introduction of socialism in South America (it was widely popular in Venezuela and Argentina) and in Cuba. It was the first magazine that promoted in the Cuban society the philosophical ideals that were developed later in the Fidel Castro revolution.

The years spent in Cuba were not characterized only by the commitment in the military: the doctor Falco began a rich series of collaborations with the University of Cuba and with other scientific and cultural institutions of the island.

Falco assumed Cuban citizenship and became a citizen adoptive of Santiago de Cuba. He became an esteemed correspondent of the "Italo-American Progress" magazine and his writings contributed greatly to the knowledge of Cuban culture in the United States.

He wrote more than 40 works on different topics and in four languages: 15 in Italian, 21 in Spanish, 6 in French and 2 in English. After the victory in the war of independence the Cuban government rewarded the loyal and idealistic commitment to Falco with institutional charges: in 1903 he was appointed first class Consul of the Republic of Cuba in the city of Genoa and then consul general in Hamburg.

As representative of the Cuban government in the European immigration international conferences related to Latin America, in 1912 Falco printed in Italy a detailed study on Italian emigration to Cuba, commissioned by the Minister of Agriculture, Trade and Labor of the Republic of Cuba, Emilio del Junco.

In 1920 he was chosen as envoy extraordinary and minister plenipotentiary of the Cuban government at the International Institute of Agriculture in Rome and later as Minister Plenipotentiary to Italy for the Cuban Republic. The years of the Fascist period were hard, because of Falco's reputation as Marxism supporter. Forced to live with few resources even because of the instability of the Cuban governments, Falco lived first at Rapallo and finally at Livorno.

On August 11, 1944, Francesco Federico Falco died in misery in Livorno, totally forgotten by the Cuban government mainly because he showed sympathies for the Italian Fascism in the late 1930s.

== See also ==
- Italian Cubans
- Orestes Ferrara
- Gian Luigi Nespoli
- Roberto Gottardi
