= Italian Cubans =

Cuban citizens of Italian descent

Italo-cubani (Italian) Ítalo-cubanos (Spanish)
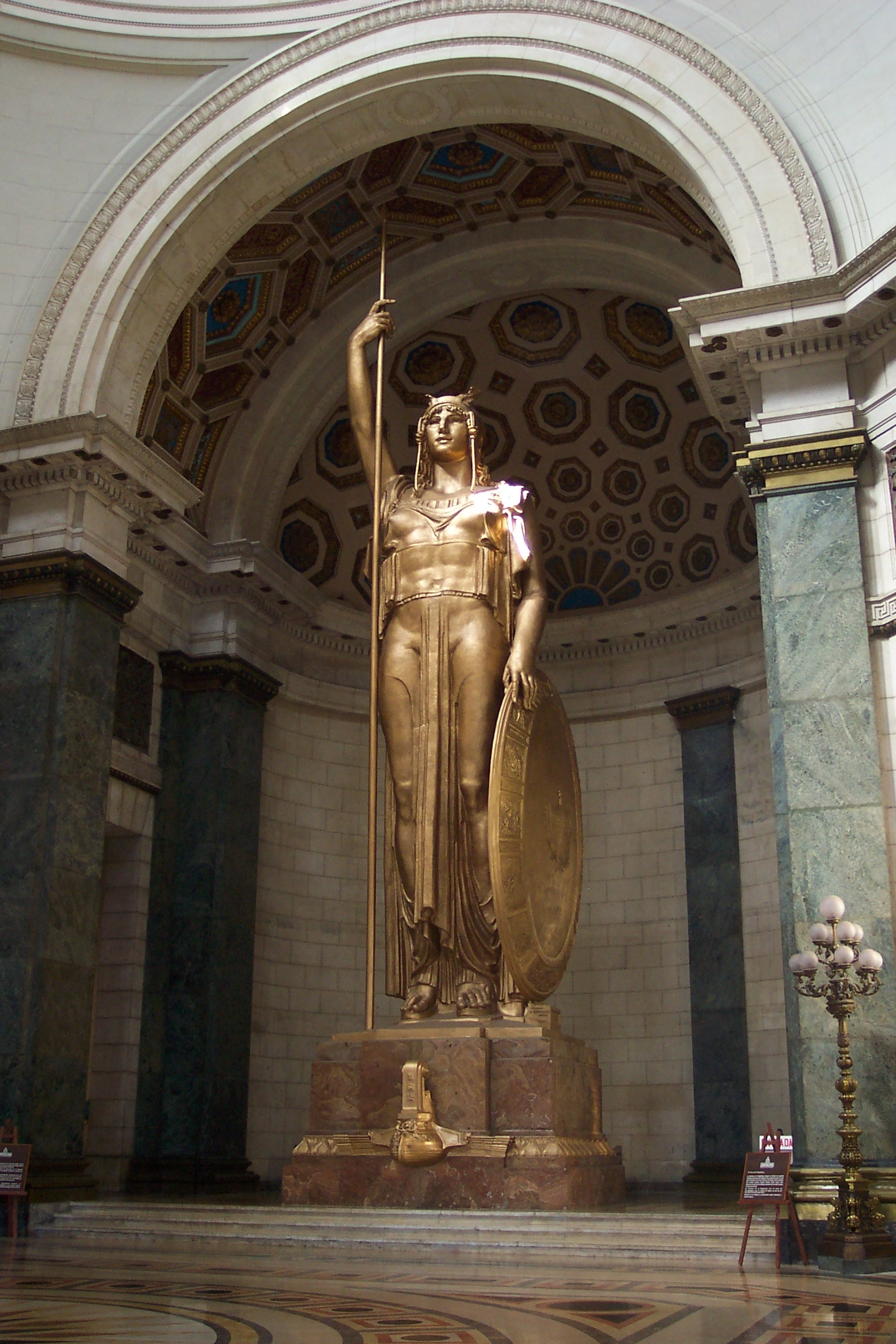
- Statue of La República at El Capitolio, 15 metres high, sculpted in 1929 by Italian Angelo Zanelli

Total population
- c. 2,300 (by birth) c. 220,000-500 000 (by ancestry)

Regions with significant populations
- La Habana · Mantua · Varadero

Languages
- Cuban Spanish · Italian and Italian dialects

Religion
- Roman Catholicism

Related ethnic groups
- Italians, Italian Americans, Italian Argentines, Italian Bolivians, Italian Brazilians, Italian Canadians, Italian Chileans, Italian Colombians, Italian Costa Ricans, Italian Dominicans, Italian Ecuadorians, Italian Guatemalans, Italian Haitians, Italian Hondurans, Italian Mexicans, Italian Panamanians, Italian Paraguayans, Italian Peruvians, Italian Puerto Ricans, Italian Salvadorans, Italian Uruguayans, Italian Venezuelans

Italian Cubans (Italian: italo-cubani; Spanish: ítalo-cubanos) are Cuban-born citizens who are fully or partially of Italian descent, whose ancestors were Italians who immigrated to Cuba during the Italian diaspora, or Italian-born people in Cuba. Italian migration to Cuba began with the conquest of the island, was minor in comparison with other waves of Italian immigration to the Americas (millions went to Argentina, Venezuela, Brazil and the United States).

== History ==
After Christopher Columbus (Italian from Genoa), accidentally found Cuba in 1492, the first Italians arrived with the Spanish conquistadores. Some were sailors and soldiers of fortune but most were missionaries. In 1605 shipwrecked Italian sailors founded the city of Mantua, Cuba in the far west of the island. These sailors came from the Genoa and Venice areas.

The Royal Decree of Graces (Real Cédula de Gracias) which was originated 10 August 1815 by the Spanish Crown, was issued with the intention of attracting European settlers who were not of Spanish origin to populate what would be the two remaining colonies of the Spanish Empire: Puerto Rico and Cuba.

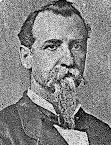
Juan Bautista Spotorno

Despite their small numbers, many Italian Cubans reached high positions in Cuban society. For example, Juan Bautista Spotorno (son of a lauded Italian family resident in Trinidad, Cuba) became a Cuban patriot and the president of the "Republic in Arms" in 1876. Italians fought and some of them died for Cuba in the first tentative for independence from Spain: in Las Tunas died in those years the Sicilian journalist Achille Aviles and later was killed the "garibaldino" Natalio Argenta.

Only in the mid-19th century did there develop a small Italian community in Cuba: they were mostly people of culture, architects, engineers, painters and artists and their families. They were called to Cuba to work in the development of the churches, monuments and government buildings in Havana. In 1884 these first Italian Cubans (who were nearly 3,000) founded the "Sociedad de Socorro Mutuo" (Society of Mutual Aid) and in 1891 the "Sociedad de Beneficiencia" to help the neediest among them. At the beginning of the 20th century socialist associations were formed but these were strongly opposed with the Catholic-aligned authorities.

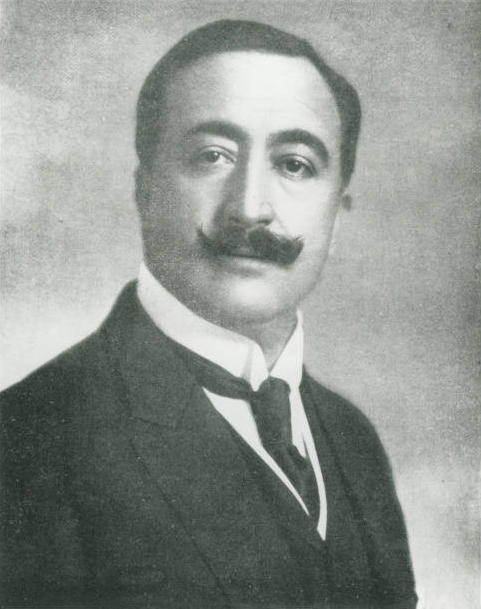
Oreste Ferrara

Some Italian Cubans participated actively in the Cuban War of Independence, such as Oreste Ferrara editor of the national El Heraldo de Cuba newspaper. Indeed, in April 1898, a group of 75 Italian volunteers sailed to Cuba with some money obtained from subscription in Italy: their leader was coronel Francesco Federico Falco, who fought bravely under general Antonio Maceo and was named "commander" of the Health Corp in the Liberation Army of Cuba. Falco later founded the magazine “La Cultura Latina” in la Habana, the first literary introduction of socialism in South America (it was widely popular in Venezuela and Argentina) and in Cuba. It was the first magazine that promoted in the Cuban society the philosophical ideals that were developed later in the Fidel Castro revolution.

In the beginning years of the 20th century many Italians living in Cuba decided to move to the United States, because of the better economic situation, while someone returned to Italy and others decided to accept the "naturalization" offered by the Cuban authorities. Dino Pogolotti (1879–1923) was a real estate entrepreneur best known for the development in 1911 of what is still known today as the “Barrio Pogolotti” in Havana, Cuba

In 1931, according to the Cuban census, there were only 1,178 people with an Italian passport in Cuba and to them must be added about 15,000 people of Italian origin, many of whom were illegitimate children of an Italian father and Cuban mother Of these Italians, 80 lived in Pinar del Río Province, 129 in Oriente Province, 762 in Havana, 30 in Matanzas Province, 103 in Las Villas Province and 74 in Camagüey Province.

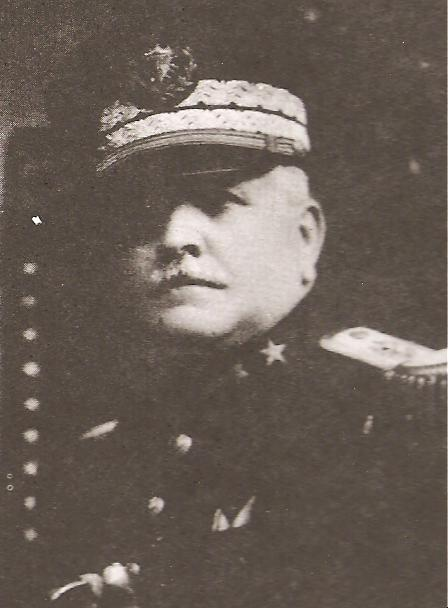
Alberto Herrera Franchi, President of Cuba in 1933

In 1933 was President of Cuba for a brief period of time the general Alberto Herrera Franchi, whose mother was Italian.

During World War II, Italy and Cuba broke off diplomatic relations and some Italian Cubans were jailed accused of sympathizing with Mussolini's Italy. In 1941, nine such Italians were jailed on Isla de Pinos (now called Isla de la Juventud; they were: Principe Camillo Ruspoli (rancher), Doctor Attilio di Gregorio (physician), Francesco Savonelli (businessman), Felice Siervo (jeweller), Erminio Tarditi (businessman), Bruni Pasquale (shoemaker), Doctor Pasquale Fontanella (physician), Francesco Grosso (tailor) y Piero Rosbochi (businessman). All were released in November 1943.

Anselmo Alliegro (the son of an Italian, Michele Alliegro Esculpino) was nominated interim President of Cuba after the departure of General Fulgencio Batista from the country in January 1959.

When Fidel Castro arose to power in 1959, some Italians -mostly marxists- went to live in Cuba in order to participate in the new "socio-political order". One of them, the poet and writer Gian Luigi Nespoli has published many books of poetry in Cuba and has received in 1994 the poetry award dedicated to the Cuban poet José María Heredia.

Roberto Gottardi

In 2008, there were over 215,000 Cubans of Italian descent, while there were around 2,340 Italian citizens, concentrated in La Habana and tourist areas such as Varadero. One of the most famous is architect Roberto Gottardi, designer of the "Escuela de Artes Escénicas" (Scenic Arts School) in Havana.

== See also ==
- Italian Mexican
- Juan Bautista Spotorno
- Orestes Ferrara
- Roberto Gottardi
- Gian Luigi Nespoli
- Francesco Federico Falco
