= El Heraldo de Cuba =

Cuban newspaper

- Founded: 1913
- Headquarters: Cuba

El Heraldo de Cuba was a national newspaper in Cuba founded by future President of Cuba Manuel Márquez Sterling in 1913. In the early 20th century, the editor was Italian Cuban war hero, Secretary of State, and ambassador to the U.S., Orestes Ferrara. El Heraldo criticized U.S. policy in Mexico in 1916, which was seen by American interests as a "grievous betrayal"

Currently, El Heraldo de Cuba has been edited again, since December 6, 2016, online by its new founder Laureano D Couso Gonzalez, can be seen online www.ElHeraldoDeCuba.com.

== Contributors ==
- Pablo Pérez, father of the musician Pérez Prado
- Miguel de Carrión
- José Rafael Pocaterra
