= Orestes Ferrara =

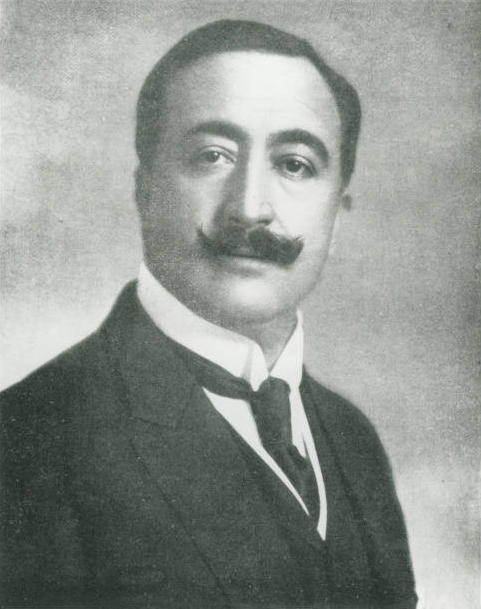
Orestes Ferrara Marino

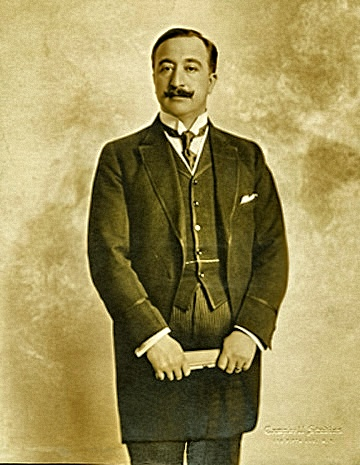
Orestes Ferrara Marino

Orestes Ferrara y Marino (18 July 1876, Naples, Italy - 16 February 1972, Rome), known in Italy as Oreste Ferrara, was an Italian Cuban, who fought for Cuba's independence. He was also an attorney, a journalist, a writer and an entrepreneur who founded one of the most successful newspapers of La Habana, El Heraldo de Cuba.

== Life ==
Ferrara was born in Napoli in 1876 and since his teens promoted the ideals of Risorgimento as an admirer of Garibaldi. At the young age of 20 he went as volunteer to Cuba in order to fight for its independence.

Ferrara spoke at rallies against Spanish oppressors for the Cuban exiles in Florida. He often wore his revolutionary garb, a uniform that had been used in Garibaldi years in Italy. After graduating as attorney in Italy, he went on to lead an expedition to Cuba and fight as a guerrilla with some of his Tampa followers. He eventually rose to numerous positions in the Cuban Republic: Ferrara was President of the House of Representatives from April 1909 to 1914 and from April 1915 to 1917, ambassador to the US and delegate to the UNESCO.

Ferrara during his nearly one hundred years of life was:

- a "mambi" colonel, hero of the Cuban War of Independence
- Cuban ambassador to the United States
- Cuban delegate to UNESCO
- Cuban Secretary of State (June 1932-August 12, 1933)
- signer of the 1940 Constitution of Cuba
- founder of the magazine La Reforma Social (1913–1926) and of El Heraldo de Cuba (1914–1926), a national newspaper which, six months after its founding would become the most widely circulated paper in Cuba with a circulation of 65,000.
- professor of the Faculty of Law in the University of La Habana.

In 1959 Ferrara, who was against the Cuban Revolution promoted by Fidel Castro, decided to go back to Italy where he died in 1972.

== Literary works ==
Ferrara wrote many books and documents, as journalist and editor:

- La guerra europea. Causas y pretextos, Nueva York-Londres, Appleton, 1915.
- La politica internazionale dell'Italia e la presente guerra. Conferenza tenuta a bordo della Dante Alighieri il 5 agosto 1915, Portici, Stabilimento tipografico E. Della Torre, 1915?
- Lessons of the war and the peace conference by Oreste Ferrara. Authorized translation from the Spanish by Leopold Grahame, New York-London, Harper & brothers, 1919.
- Machiavel. Traduit par Francis de Miomandre, Paris, H. Champion, 1928. Ed. italiana: Machiavelli, Milano, Treves, 1930.
- El panamericanismo y la opinion europea, Paris, Le livre libre, 1930. Ed francese: L'Amérique et l'Europe. Le panaméricanisme et l'opinion europeénne. Traduction Francis de Miomandre, Paris, Le Oeuvres représentatives, 1930.
- Tentativas de intervención europea en América: 1896-1898, La Habana, Editorial Hermes, 1933.
- Le pape Borgia. Alexandre VI. Traduit par Francis de Miomandre, Paris, Librairie ancienne Honore Champion, 1939. Ed. italiana: Il papa Borgia, a cura di Alessandro Cutolo, Milano, Garzanti, 1953.
- Mis relaciones con Maximo Gomez. Apéndice memoria sobre la guerra de indipendencia por Lorenzo Despradel, seconda edizione, La Habana, Molina y Compania, 1942.
- Un pleito sucesorio: Enrique IV, Isabel de Castilla y la Beltraneja, Madrid, La Nave, 1945.
- Ciceron y Mirabeau. La moral de dos grandes oradores, Madrid, La Nave, 1949.
- El siglo XVI a la luz de los embajadores venecianos, Madrid, Graficas Orbe, 1952. Ed. italiana: Il secolo XVI visto dagli ambasciatori veneziani, traduzione di Emma Barzini, Milano, A. Martello, 1960.
- Gasparo Contarini et ses missions. Traduit de l'espagnol par Francis de Miomandre, Paris, Albin Michel, 1956.
- L'Avenement d'Isabelle la Catholique. Traduit de l'Espagnol par Francois de Miomandre, Paris, A. Michel, 1958.
- Il pensiero politico di Nitti sui trattati di pace, Estr. da: Nuova Antologia, pp 351–78, Novembre 1958.
- Philippe II. Traduit de l'espanol par Francis de Miomandre et A. D. Toledano, Paris, Albin Michel, 1961. Ed. Italiana: Filippo II, traduzione di Emma Barzini, Milano, A. Martello, 1965.

== See also ==
- Italian Cuban
- Juan Bautista Spotorno
- Gian Luigi Nespoli
- Roberto Gottardi
