= Carol Morgan School =

The Carol Morgan School of Santo Domingo

Location
- Av. Sarasota, APDO. 1169; Santo Domingo; Dominican Republic
- Coordinates: 18.4469682°N 69.9519522°W

Information
- Former name: The Little School, the Santo Domingo Calvert School
- Type: Private
- Motto: Founded in Integrity, Focused on Learning
- Religious affiliation: None
- Established: 1933
- Founder: Carol and Barney Morgan
- Principal: Elementary School: Paola Torres; Middle School: Annikke Olson; High School: Arnetta Young
- Headmaster: Dr. Brian M. Kelly
- Staff: 312
- Grades: PreK-12
- Gender: Co-educational
- Enrollment: 1,160 (2023-2024)
- Language: English
- Campus size: 15 acres
- Colors: Maroon and white
- Mascot: Sharks
- Accreditation: Middle States Association of Colleges and Schools
- Website: Official website
- Last updated: April 2024

Carol Morgan School is a private international, college-preparatory school located in Santo Domingo, Dominican Republic. The school is formatted based on the American education system and is accredited by Middle States Association of Colleges and Schools.

== History ==
In 1933, while she and her husband were in Santo Domingo on a missionary trip, Carol Morgan was faced with the dilemma of finding an English-language education based on American curricula for her children. She started her own school, the "Little School" or the "Santo Domingo Calvert School," based on the Calvert Education system The initial school was held in an abandoned Episcopal Chapel and had three teachers, five students, and one room and worked with donated school supplies. Nearly 100 years later, the school had an enrollment of just over 1,000 students.

The Morgans returned to the United States in 1949, and the school was renamed Carol Morgan School (CMS) in her honor. In 1964, the Dominican government donated property, and the American embassy donated construction materials, and ground broke the following year on the land where the school is presently located. Construction was completed in 1965, and students began attending the new campus in 1966.

As of 2014, the school is located on a fifteen-acre campus in Santo Domingo. The elementary school has 34 classrooms; the middle school, 15; and the high school, 23. There are 7 computer labs with over 400 computers; a library and technology center; a theatre; an art pavilion; and band and choir classrooms. There is also an outdoor amphitheater for events, two soccer fields, and a gymnasium.

== Academics ==
Carol Morgan offers instruction from pre-kindergarten through twelfth grade. The school is not religiously affiliated, and there is no religious instruction.

More than 98% of CMS graduates pursue a higher degree.

== Athletics ==
CMS is associated with the Association of Colombian-Caribbean American Schools (ACCAS) and the Caribbean Area International School Sports Association (CAISSA). Elementary school students can play basketball and soccer, and middle and high school students can choose from baseball, basketball, soccer, volleyball, table tennis, competitive robotics, ultimate frisbee, and track and field.

== Student body ==
During the 2018-2019 academic year, 58% of students came from the Dominican Republic, while the other 42% came from other countries, including the United States (30%), Argentina, Belgium, Bolivia, Brazil, Canada, China, Colombia, Denmark, Ecuador, El Salvador, Ethiopia, France, Germany, Israel, Italy, Jamaica, Japan, Mexico, the Netherlands, Nicaragua, Panama, Peru, Puerto Rico, South Korea, Spain, Switzerland, Taiwan, Trinidad and Tobago, United Kingdom, and Venezuela. Many students speak English as a second language.

== Notable alumni ==
- Julia Alvarez (born 1950) (attended the school from 1955-1960), poet, novelist, and essayist best known for her novels How the García Girls Lost Their Accents and In the Time of the Butterflies

Distinguished Alumni Award Recipients •2003 Simón Suárez ’68 •2004 Juan Batlle '72 •2005 Manuel Alejandro Grullón '70 •2006 Julio Santos '84 •2007 Ligia Bonetti '86 •2008 Todd Martínez '85 •2009 Mary Fernández '74 •2010 José Rafael Yunen '90 •2011 Gregory Castleman '72 •2012 Steven Puig '78 •2013 Ramón Cáceres '79 •2014 Jaak E. Rannik ’60 •2015 James H. Willig '91 •2016 Georges Santoni ‘77 •2017 Máximo Vidal ‘75 •2018 Lucile Houellemont ‘86 •2019 Miguel Viyella ‘74 •2020 María Angélica Haza ‘86 •2021 Robert E. Joslin '73 •2022 Celso Marranzini '69
