= Panamá Viejo =

Remains of the original Panama City, destroyed in 1671

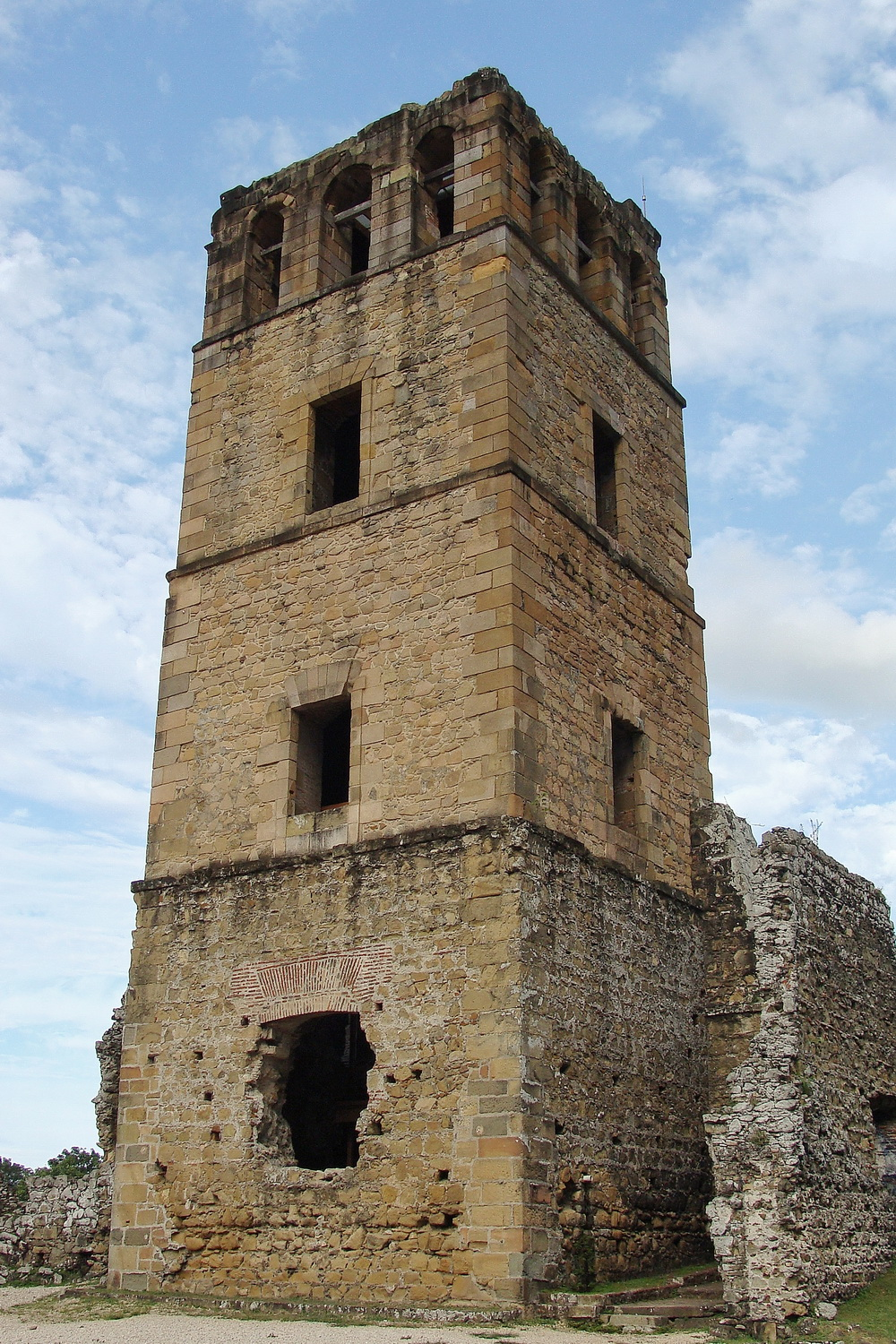
- Old Panama Cathedral

- Location in Panama
- 9°00′20″N 79°29′09″W
- Location: Panama City, Panama

History
- Founded: 1519

UNESCO World Heritage Site
- Official name: Archaeological Site of Panamá Viejo
- Type: Cultural
- Criteria: ii, iv
- Designated: 1582rev (47th session)
- Part of: The Colonial Transisthmian Route of Panamá
- Reference no.: 1582rev-005
- Extension: 2003
- Region: Latin America and the Caribbean

Panamá Viejo (English: "Old Panama"), also known as Panamá la Vieja, is the remaining part of the original Panama City, the former capital of Panama, which was destroyed in 1671 by the Welsh privateer Henry Morgan. It is located in the suburbs of the current capital. Together with the historical district of Panamá, it has been a UNESCO World Heritage Site since 1997.

== History ==
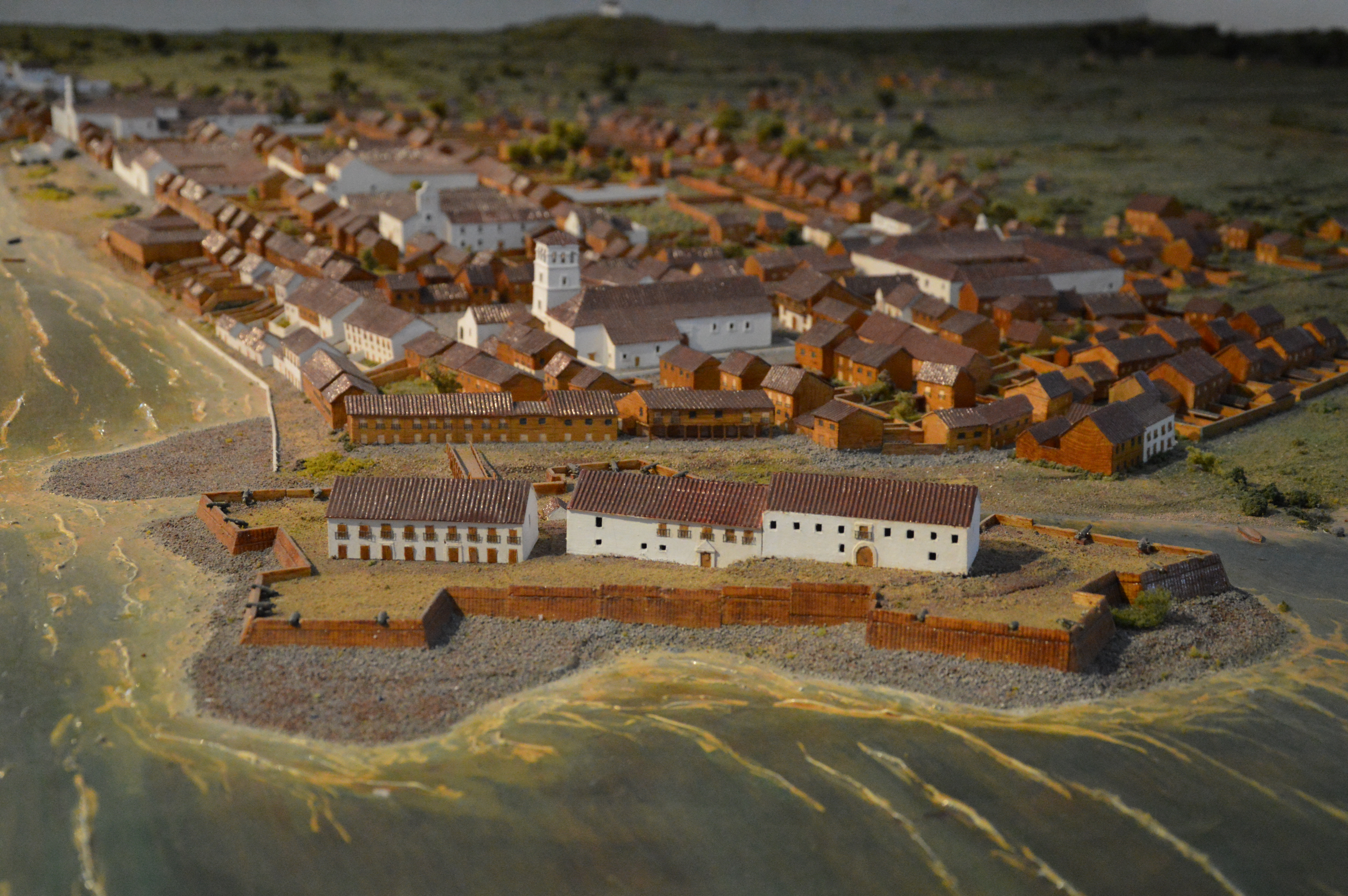
Diorama of Panamá Viejo

A settlement was founded on August 15, 1519 by Pedro Arias Dávila and another 100 inhabitants. At the time, it was the first permanent European settlement on the Pacific Ocean, replacing the two cities of Santa María la Antigua del Darién and Acla. Two years later, in 1521, the settlement was promoted to the status of city by a royal decree and was given a coat of arms by Charles V of Spain, forming a new cabildo. Shortly after its creation, the city became a starting point for various expeditions in Peru and an important base where gold and silver were sent to Spain.

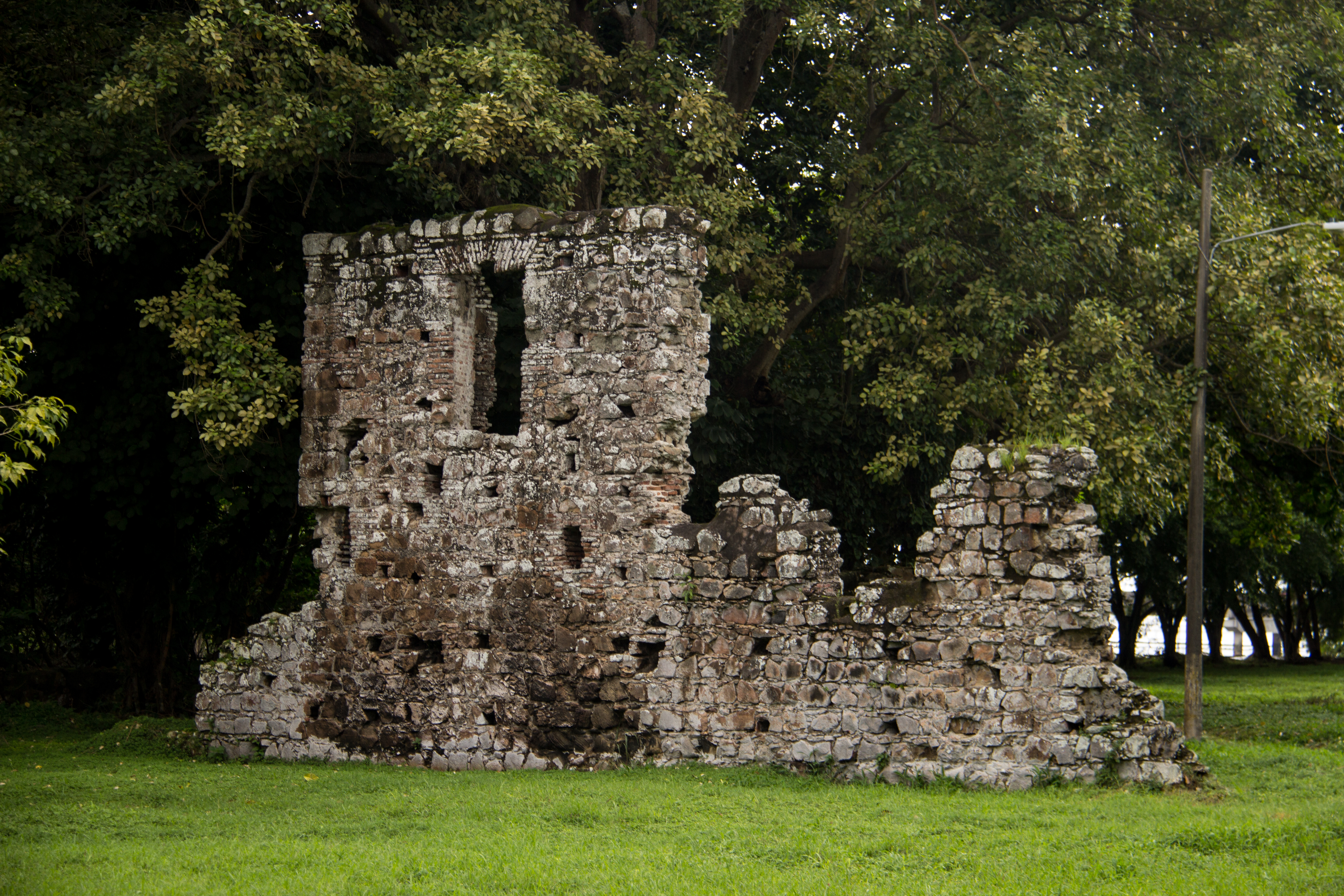
The "Casa de los Genoveses" (house of Genoans) in Panama Viejo

From 1520, some Genoese merchants ruled the commerce of Old Panama (Panamá Viejo) on the Pacific Ocean for a century, thanks to a concession given by the Spaniards, who had the Republic of Genoa as allies.

Between 1586 and 1587, there were already 11 Italians in Panama, seeking naturalization and the right to stay in Panama. According to a census around 1587, Panama City had 548 inhabitants (some of them descendants of the first Genoese settlers), of whom 53 were foreigners and of these 18 were Italians.

In 1539 and 1563, the city suffered a number of fires which destroyed parts of it but did not impede the city's development. In 1610, the city reached a population of 5,000, with 500 houses, as well as convents, chapels, a hospital and a cathedral.

At the beginning of the 17th century, the city was attacked several times by pirates and by indigenous people from Darién. On 2 May 1620, an earthquake damaged many buildings in the city. On 21 February 1644, the Great Fire destroyed 83 religious buildings, including the cathedral. At this time, there were 8,000 people living in the city.

In 1670, the city counted 10,000 inhabitants. On 28 January 1671, in response to intelligence that the colonies of New Spain were gathering forces to attack Jamaica, the Welsh privateer Henry Morgan attacked the city with 1,400 men, marching from the Caribbean coast across the jungle. Forces sent from Panama to ambush Morgan in the jungle passes ran away rather than face them and, although tired and hungry from their nine-day march, Morgan's force reached the plains outside the city. Although outnumbered, and facing heavy guns and cavalry, the English defeated the city's militia then proceeded to sack Panamá.

Either Morgan and his army started a fire that burned the city or the Captain General Emanuel Gonzalez Revilla ordered the explosion of the gunpowder magazines. The city's viceroy, Don Juan Perez de Guzman himself wrote, "I endeavoured with all my industry to persuade the soldiers to turn and face our enemies but it was impossible; so that nothing hindering them, they entered the city to which the slave and owners of the houses had set fire". Morgan wrote, "There we were forced to put out the fires of the enemy's houses; but it was in vain, for by 12 at night it was all consumed that might be called the City". These contemporary accounts both strongly support the story that it was burned by its inhabitants; indeed there was no incentive for the English to set it alight as they had not had chance to loot it. Either way, the resulting fire destroyed the city. Morgan's attack caused the loss of thousands of lives (his report stated 400 Spanish casualties) and Panamá had to be rebuilt a few kilometres to the west on a new site (the current one).

Henry Morgan was arrested but, after proving he knew nothing of the recently completed Treaty of Madrid which ended hostilities between England and Spain, was subsequently freed and later rewarded.

UNESCO added Panamá Viejo to the World Heritage list in 1997. It justified its inclusion on the grounds that the site is the "oldest continuously occupied European settlement in the Pacific coast of the Americas".

== Popular culture ==
This UNESCO World Heritage Site was a Pit Stop of the 19th season of The Amazing Race.

The reward feast from a reward challenge in the 7th season of the CBS show Survivor was held at this place.

== Gallery ==
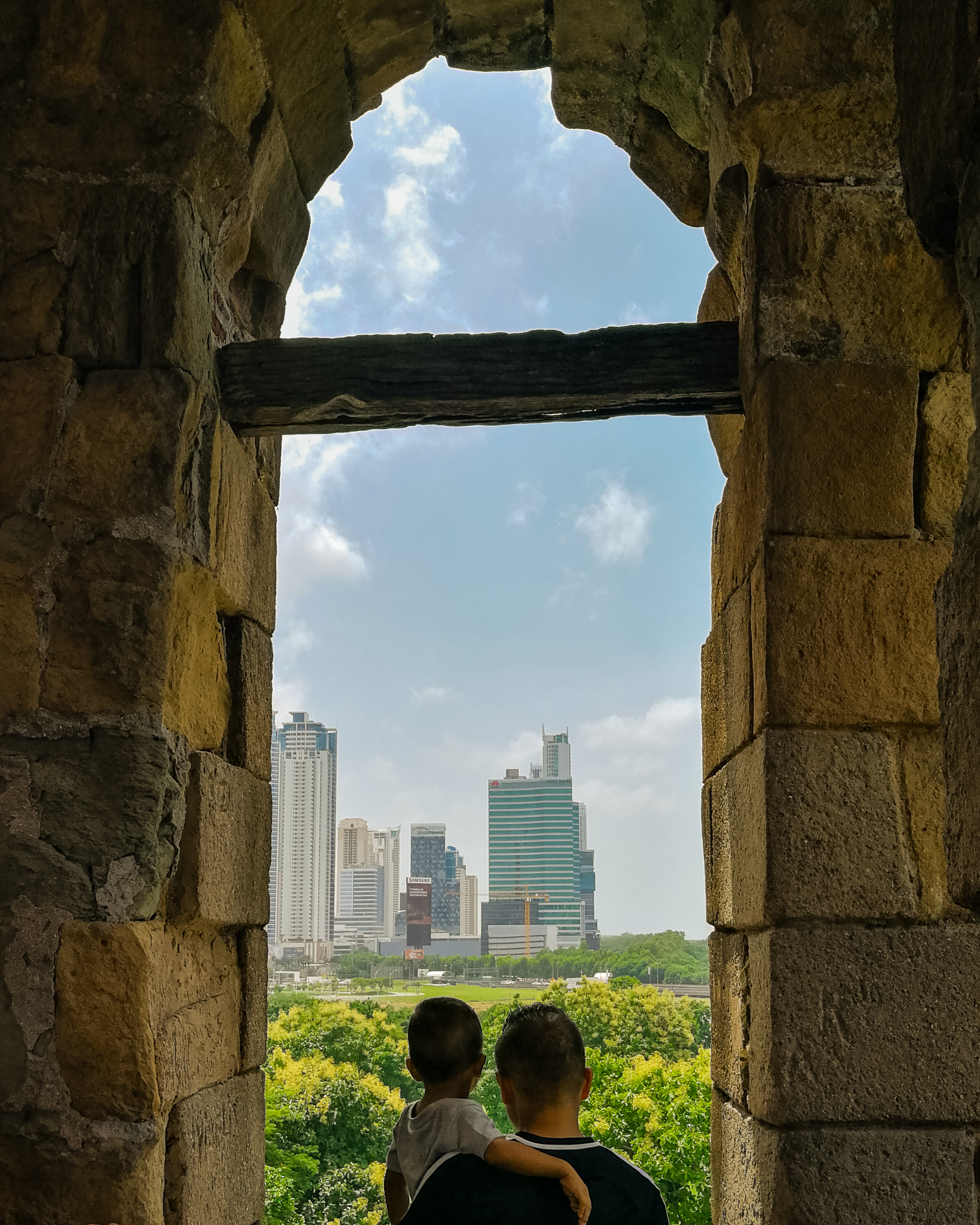
View from the Bell Tower to Costa del Este.

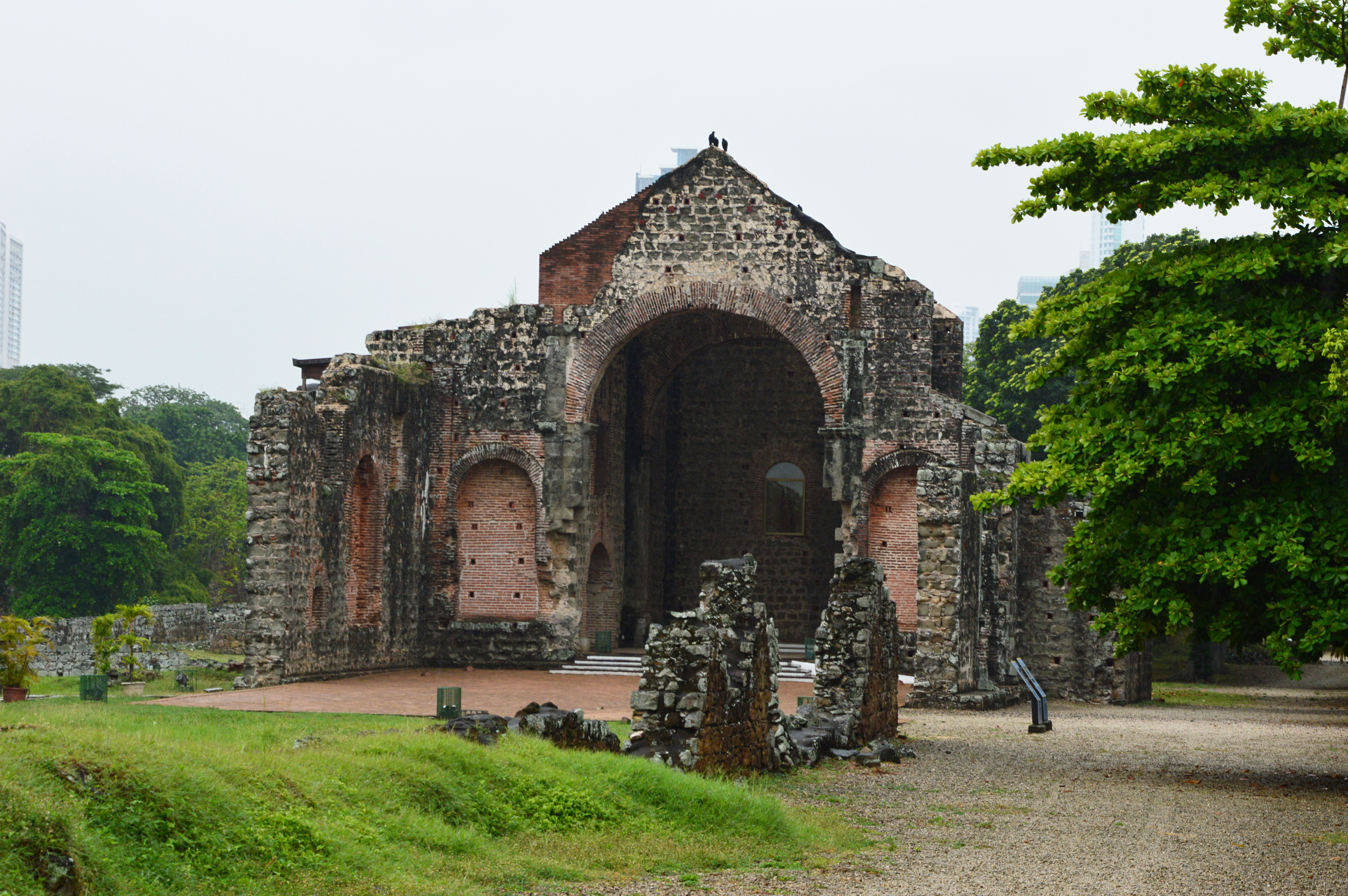
Ruins of the Concepción nuns' convent

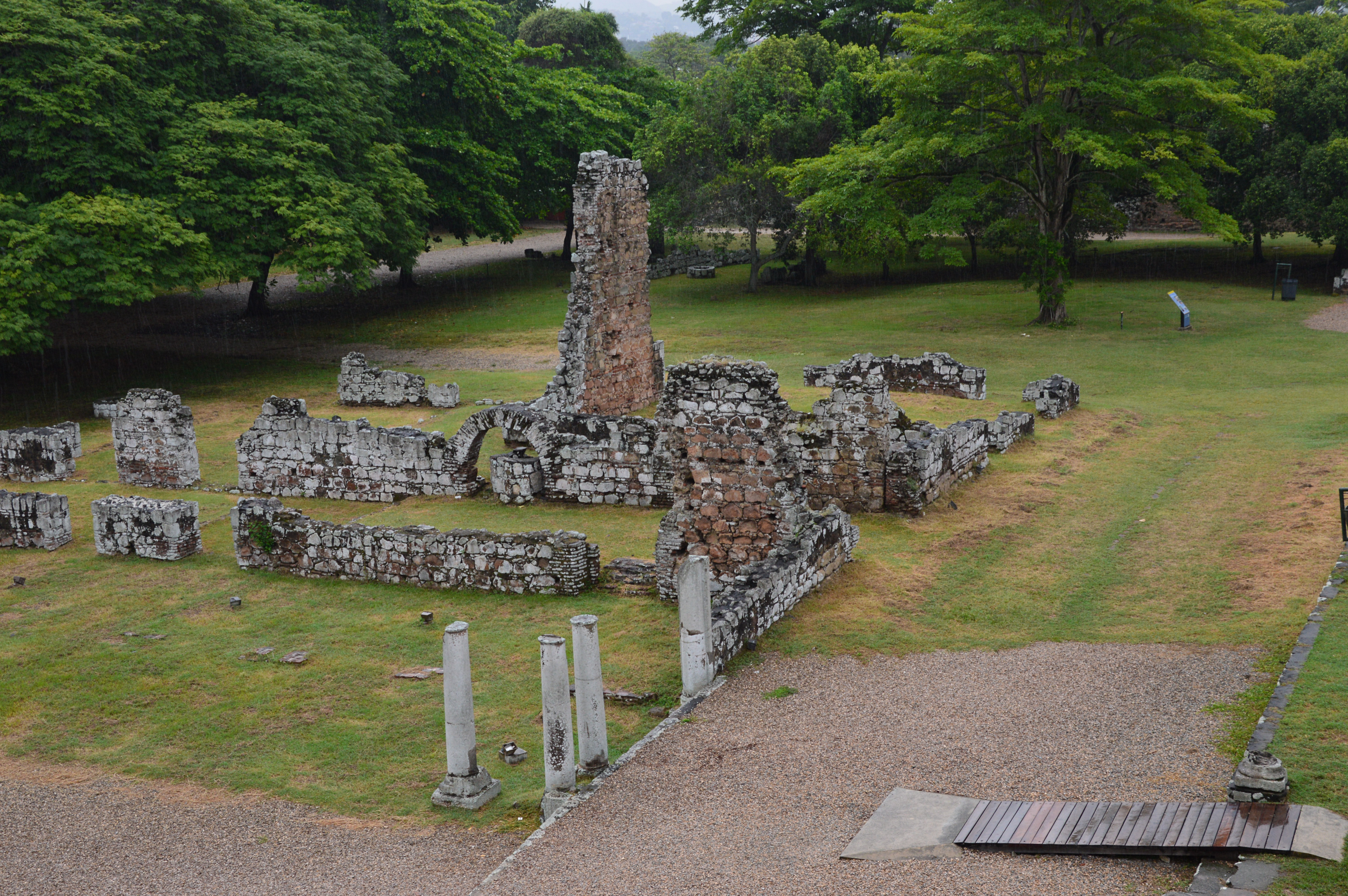
Ruins

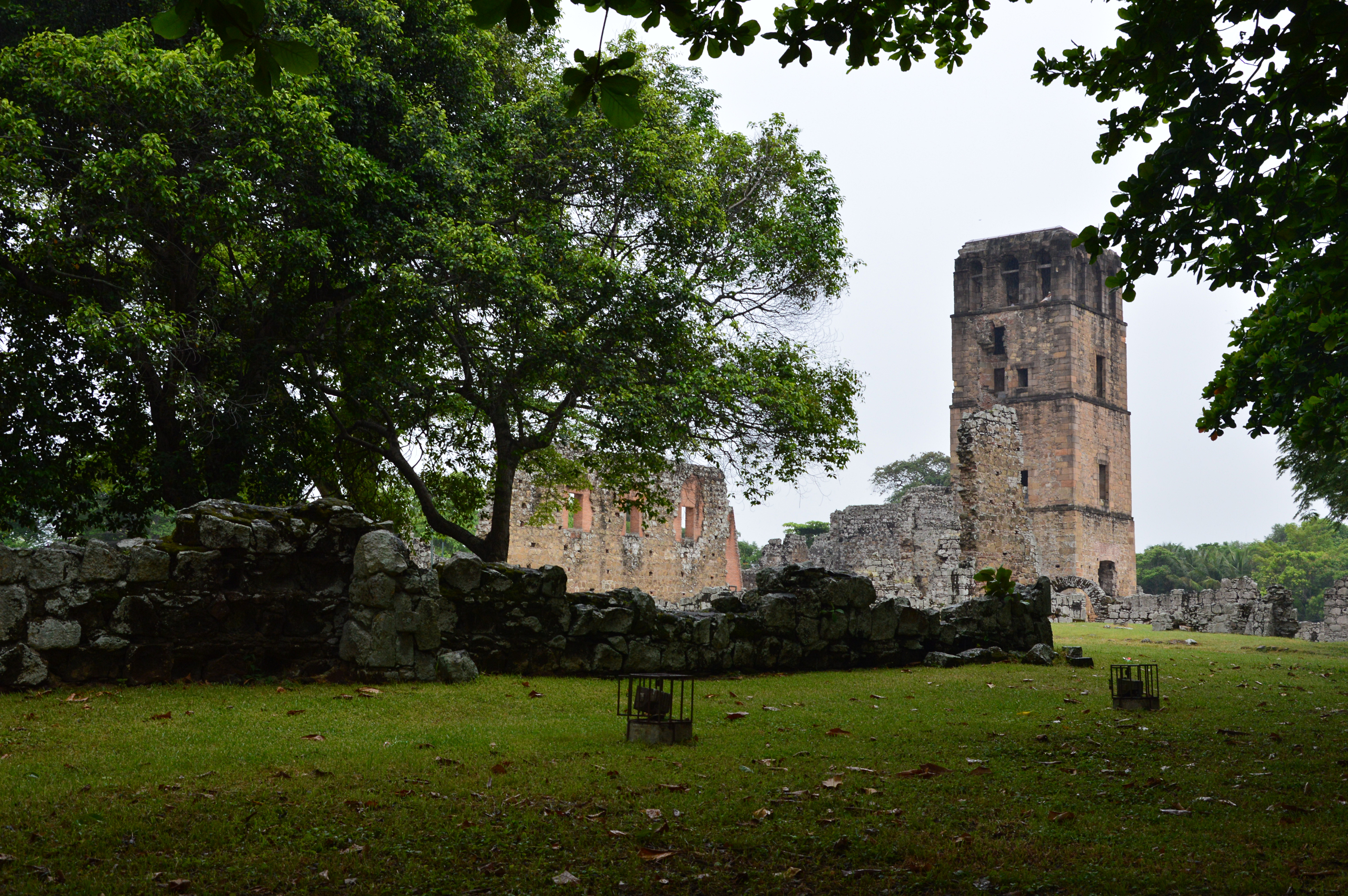
Distant view of old Panama Cathedral
