= Andrea Bosco =

Dominican footballer (born 1995)

Personal information
- Date of birth: 6 October 1995 (age 31)
- Place of birth: Milan, Italy
- Height: 1.85 m (6 ft 1 in)
- Position: Centre back

Team information
- Current team: Pineto

Senior career*
| Years | Team | Apps | (Gls) |
| 2012–2013 | CTL Campania | 30 | (0) |
| 2013–2014 | Mariano Keller | 30 | (0) |
| 2014–2017 | Aversa | 45 | (1) |
| 2014–2015 | → Campobasso (loan) | 15 | (0) |
| 2017 | → Savoia (loan) | 13 | (1) |
| 2017–2018 | Nerostellati Frattese | 28 | (0) |
| 2018–2019 | Francavilla | 30 | (1) |
| 2019–2021 | Pro Sesto | 27 | (0) |
| 2021– | Pineto | 12 | (1) |

International career^{‡}
| 2021– | Dominican Republic | 4 | (0) |
- * Club domestic league appearances and goals as of 5 June 2021. ‡ National team caps and goals as of 10 June 2021

Andrea Bosco (born 6 October 1995) is an Italian-born Dominican footballer who plays as a centre back for Serie D club Pineto and the Dominican Republic national team.

== International career ==
Bosco's mother is Dominican. He made his senior international debut in 2021.
