= Celso Marranzini =

Dominican businessman and economist

- Born: 11 January 1952 (age 74); Santo Domingo, Dominican Republic
- Known for: his role in CONEP and CDEEE
- Board member of: Corporación Dominicana de Empresas Elécticas Estatales
- Parent(s): Constantino Marranzini (father), María Altagracia Pérez Pintado (mother)
- Relatives: Frank Rainieri Marranzini (second-cousin), Diego "El Marran" Marranzini (Relative)

Celso José Marranzini Pérez (born 11 January 1952, in Santo Domingo) is an economist and businessman from the Dominican Republic. He was the Vice President of Corporación Dominicana de Empresas Eléctricas Estatales (CDEEE, "Dominican Corporation of State Electrical Companies"); former chairman of Consejo Nacional de la Empresa Privada (CONEP, "National Council of the Private Enterprise").

He was born to Constantino Marranzini Risk (the son of Liberato Marranzini, an Italian immigrant from Santa Lucia di Serino, and Amelia Risk Assis, a Lebanese immigrant) and María Altagracia Pérez Pintado (the daughter of Celso Pérez, a Spanish industrialist from Asturias, and Carmen Pintado, who was born in Puerto Rico to Spanish parents).
