= Mary Pérez de Marranzini =

Dominican philanthropist (1926–2025)

María Altagracia Pérez Pintado (20 September 1926 – 8 May 2025), known as Mary Pérez de Marranzini, was a Dominican philanthropist, recognized for having founder, in 1963, the Dominican Association of Rehabilitation, to provide services to people with physical, motor, and intellectual disabilities.

== Early life ==
Pintado was born in Santo Domingo on 20 September 1926, to Celso Pérez, a native of Asturias, Spain, and Carmen Pintado de Pérez, a Puerto Rican daughter of Spaniards.

In 1959, her eldest son, Celso, with her husband Constantino Marranzini, contracted polio. The aftermath of the disease motivated her to join efforts to eradicate polio in the Dominican Republic.

== Career ==
Through the Dominican Rehabilitation Association, she managed to change the way people with physical and intellectual disabilities are comprehensively cared for in the Dominican Republic.

She participated in various national and international organizations, including the Secretariat for Rehabilitation, the National Health Commission, the National Drug Council, the National Development Commission, and the National Council for the Prevention, Education, Rehabilitation, and Social Integration of People with Disabilities. She also contributed to legislative reforms, awareness talks, and international conferences.

Perez de Marranzini died on 8 May 2025, at the age of 98.

== Awards ==
- Papal Order of Saint Sylvester, granted by John Paul II.
- Honorary Citizen of Dallas, Texas.
- Honorary Doctorate in Humanities from the University of Puerto Rico.
- Honorary Doctorate from the Dominican World University.
- Gallo de Oro Award.
- "Bien por ti" Medal by the Vice Presidency of the Dominican Republic.
- Merit Recognition by the National District City Council.
- Women Who Change the World Award by Banco BHD León.
