= Antonio Bonetti =

Italian painter (1710–1787)

Antonio Bonetti (1710–1787) was an Italian painter, active mainly in Bologna in quadratura painting.

== Biography ==
He trained with Serafino Brizzi. He painted in the church of the Madonna del Baraccano in Bologna. In the year of his death, he was elected to the Accademia Clementina. He also decorated a room in the Palazzo Orsi in via San Vitale number 28.

Among his pupils was Vincenzo Conti.
