= Valerio de Sanctis de Ferrari =

- Valerio María
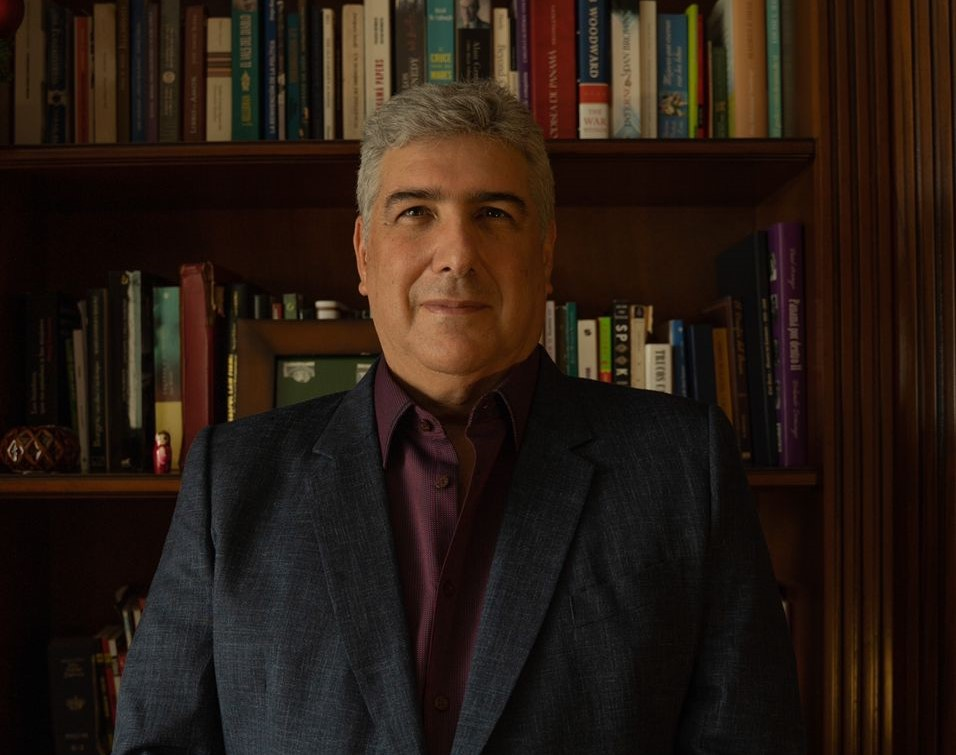
- Education: Bachelor's Degree in Finance with a major in Banking
- Alma mater: Universidad Santa María de la Antigua, Panamá (USMA)
- Occupation: Businessman in the fishing industry
- Spouse: Yariela Natera de Sanctis

Valerio María de Sanctis de Ferrari (Padova, 1962) is an Italian-Panamanian businessman and politician. From his different responsibilities as a director of Panama's fishing sector, he has contributed to the country's maritime and natural resources legislation. He was president of the Panamanian Olympic Committee in 2010 and is president of Group Panalang Inc.

== Biography ==
Of Italian origin, he is the great-grandson of Sante de Sanctis, founder of Italian psychiatry. His parents immigrated to Panama in 1975, where he has spent his business and family life. He is the father of 4 children and his youngest daughter, Laura de Sanctis, was Miss Panama 2017, participating in the Miss Universe competition.

He graduated as an economist specialized in Finance from Universidad Santa María de la Antigua (USMA). His thesis was entitled "The Bond Market: a long-term financing alternative", and was published in 1987.

Since completing his studies, he has had a long career as a businessman in the fishing and maritime resources sector, holding various political and business positions. He has been part of the business association network with executive responsibilities. Between 1994 and 2014 he was president of Appexmar (Exporters of seafood products); between 2010 and 2012 he was president of the Panamanian Association of Exporters (APEX), and between 2008 and 2009 president of the Union of Industrialists of Panama (SIP).

His corporate responsibility led him to be part of several government agencies in the maritime sector. He has been director of the Aquatic Resources Authority of Panama (ARAP) between 2007-9 and 2017-9; director of the Maritime Authority (AMP) between 2008-9, and representative of medium-scale fishing, to the National Commission for Responsible Fishing (2022). He participated in the elaboration of several legislative regulations that resulted in greater wealth for the fishermen sector, such as the Ley de Abonos Tributarios.

Throughout his career he has promoted Panamanian sports. He was president of the Panamanian Tennis Federation from 2006 to 2010 and the Panamanian Olympic Committee president in 2010.

== Awards ==
- Knight of the Sovereign Military Hospitaller Order of St. John of Jerusalem, Rhodes and of Malta, 2019
- Municipality of Chiriqui: Key to the city of David, Panama 2012.
- APEX: Fishing Exporter of the Year 2012
- Order of Malta Covid-19 Medal Panama, 2022

== Controversy ==
He was the victim of a government plot for supporting opposition candidates during the 2014 elections. On the website of the Italian newspaper Corriere della Sera, a video report was fleetingly published, starring a hooded person, showing the logo of his company, Panalang Union, which was allegedly involved in drug trafficking. This was immediately echoed by certain Panamanian newspapers with the sole purpose of discrediting the group and its president. In 2014, he filed a lawsuit against the Italian newspaper for defamation, slander and aggravated libel before the Italian courts. He also obtained two certificates, one from the Italian authorities and the other from the Panamanian authorities, assuring that no judicial investigation was open against him or his company.
