= Rosalina Santoro =

Ecuadorian footballer (born 2002)

Personal information
- Full name: Rosalina Anastasia Santoro Estrada
- Date of birth: 30 July 2002 (age 24)
- Place of birth: Pembroke Pines, Florida, U.S.
- Height: 1.68 m (5 ft 6 in)
- Position: Forward

Youth career
- Sunrise Soccer Club West Broward Bobcats

College career
Years	Team	Apps	(Gls)
2020–2021	Alcorn State Lady Braves	27	(4)

International career^{‡}
2021	Dominican Republic	1	(0)
- ‡ National team caps and goals as of 18 February 2021.

Rosalina Anastasia Santoro Estrada (born 30 July 2002) is an Ecuadorian footballer who plays as a forward for American college team Alcorn State Lady Braves and the Ecuador women's national under-20 team. Born in the United States, she has previously played for the senior Dominican Republic women's national team.

== Early life ==
Santoro was born and raised in Pembroke Pines, Florida to a Dominican father of Italian descent and an Ecuadorian mother.

== High school and college career ==
Santoro has attended the West Broward High School in Pembroke Pines, Florida and the Alcorn State University in Lorman, Mississippi.

== Club career ==
Quito Futbol Club (2024). [4]

== International career ==
Santoro made her senior debut for the Dominican Republic on 18 February 2021 as an 86th-minute substitution in a 1–1 friendly home draw against Puerto Rico. In December 2021, she participated in a microcycle for the Ecuador women's national under-20 team.
