= Ligia Bonetti =

Dominican businesswoman (born 1968)

- Born: 27 March 1968 (age 58); Santo Domingo, Dominican Republic
- Education: Carol Morgan School; Wheaton College; Wharton School of the University of Pennsylvania
- Known for: Entrepreneurial leadership
- Board member of: MercaSID
- Parents: José Miguel Bonetti (father); Consuelo Amelia Dubreil Bancalari (mother)
- Relatives: María Ligia Evangelista Bonetti (aunt), Charles Mclean Reid Cabral (ex uncle-in-law), Hugo Tolentino Dipp (ex uncle-in-law)

External image
- Image of Ligia Bonetti hosted on mercasid.com.do

Ligia Consuelo Bonetti Dubreil (born 27 March 1968 in Santo Domingo), formerly known as Ligia Bonetti de Valiente when she was married, is a businesswoman from the Dominican Republic. Since January 2015, she has served as the chairperson and chief executive officer of Grupo SID.

Bonetti has served as the president of both the Association of Industries of the Dominican Republic (AIRD) and the National Association of Young Entrepreneurs (ANJE). In 1999, she was admitted as a Dame of the Sovereign Military Order of Malta, and in 2016, she was awarded an honorary Doctor of Law degree from her alma mater, Wheaton College, in recognition of her corporate achievements and public service.

== Early life and education ==
Ligia Bonetti was born on 27 March 1968, in Santo Domingo, Dominican Republic. She is the daughter of Consuelo Amelia Dubreil Bancalari and José Miguel Bonetti. She grew up in Santo Domingo, where she completed her primary and secondary education at the Carol Morgan School. She graduated from Wheaton College in Norton with a degree in economics in 1989. She also completed advanced educational programs in Marketing, Blockchain, and Digital Assets at the Wharton School of the University of Pennsylvania and Executive CEO Program at Northwestern University in Chicago.

== Career ==
She has been chairperson and CEO of Grupo SID since January 2015. Bonetti is the president of the Association of Industries of the Dominican Republic (AIRD) and a member of the Entrepreneurial Academic Council of Barna Business School. She was President of the National Association of Young Entrepreneurs (ANJE).

== Awards ==
In 1999, she was admitted as a Dame of the Sovereign Military Order of Malta. She also received an honorary Doctor of Law degree from Wheaton College during its 181st commencement ceremony on 21 May 2016. It was presented by Wheaton College president Dennis M. Hanno, as recognition for her corporate achievements and her philanthropic service.

Business positions
Preceded by José Miguel Bonetti	President of Grupo SID; 2015–present	Incumbent
