= Italian Ecuadorians =

Ecuadorian citizens of Italian descent

Italo-ecuadoriani (Italian) Ítalo-ecuatorianos (Spanish)
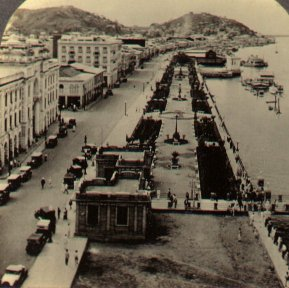
- The Guayaquil seafront was built in 1920, taking the lungomare of some Italian cities as a model

Total population
- c. 19,000 (by birth) c. 56,000 (by ancestry)

Regions with significant populations
- Guayaquil

Languages
- Ecuadorian Spanish · Italian and Italian dialects

Religion
- Roman Catholic

Related ethnic groups
- Italians, Italian diaspora

Italian Ecuadorians (Italian: italo-ecuadoriani; Spanish: ítalo-ecuatorianos) are Ecuadorian-born citizens who are fully or partially of Italian descent, whose ancestors were Italians who emigrated to Ecuador during the Italian diaspora, or Italian-born people in Ecuador.

Italian immigration to Ecuador has developed above all in the last two centuries. Ecuador is a country in which there are Italian communities, which – like other countries in Latin America – have spread throughout the national territory. The Italians who immigrated to Ecuador are predominantly Ligurian.

== History ==
The first Italians heading to Ecuador embarked from the port of Genoa in the 19th century. Many of these Italians were sailors and inhabitants of rural regions, who ventured to emigrate to South American lands. First, they sailed to the Chilean ports, then the migratory waves extended to the northernmost ports (Peru and Ecuador). A part of the Italian immigrants arrived in Guayaquil from Peru, fleeing the Peruvian/Chilean war.

Before World War I, a small colony of Italians existed in Ecuador; 650 in total, of whom 500 lived in Guayaquil. Almost two-thirds were originally from Liguria and were mainly engaged in trade between Ecuador and Europe.

Starting from the 1920s, many Italians emigrated to the coasts of Ecuador; the vast majority settled in Guayaquil.

In 1921, the Italians founded "La Previsora", the first financial company in Ecuador, which promoted the cultivation and marketing of Ecuadorian cocoa in the world. The Italian government sent the "Accorsi Mission" to Ecuador for economic-military aid and an agricultural colony of Italians was planned near the Colombian border, but the intervention of the United States and its oil companies (which feared the Italian presence) blocked everything.

Italians were very well accepted in the country due to their integration with Ecuadorian culture. Along with the presence of the Spanish on the north and south coasts of the country, the Italians began to develop various activities on the coasts. In Guayaquil, they established shops and various industries.

There are currently 19,000 Italian citizens and almost 56,000 descendants of Italians residing in Ecuador, being one of the lowest rates of migrant ancestry in the country, where Arabs and Spaniards play a more prominent role.

== Notable Italian Ecuadorians ==
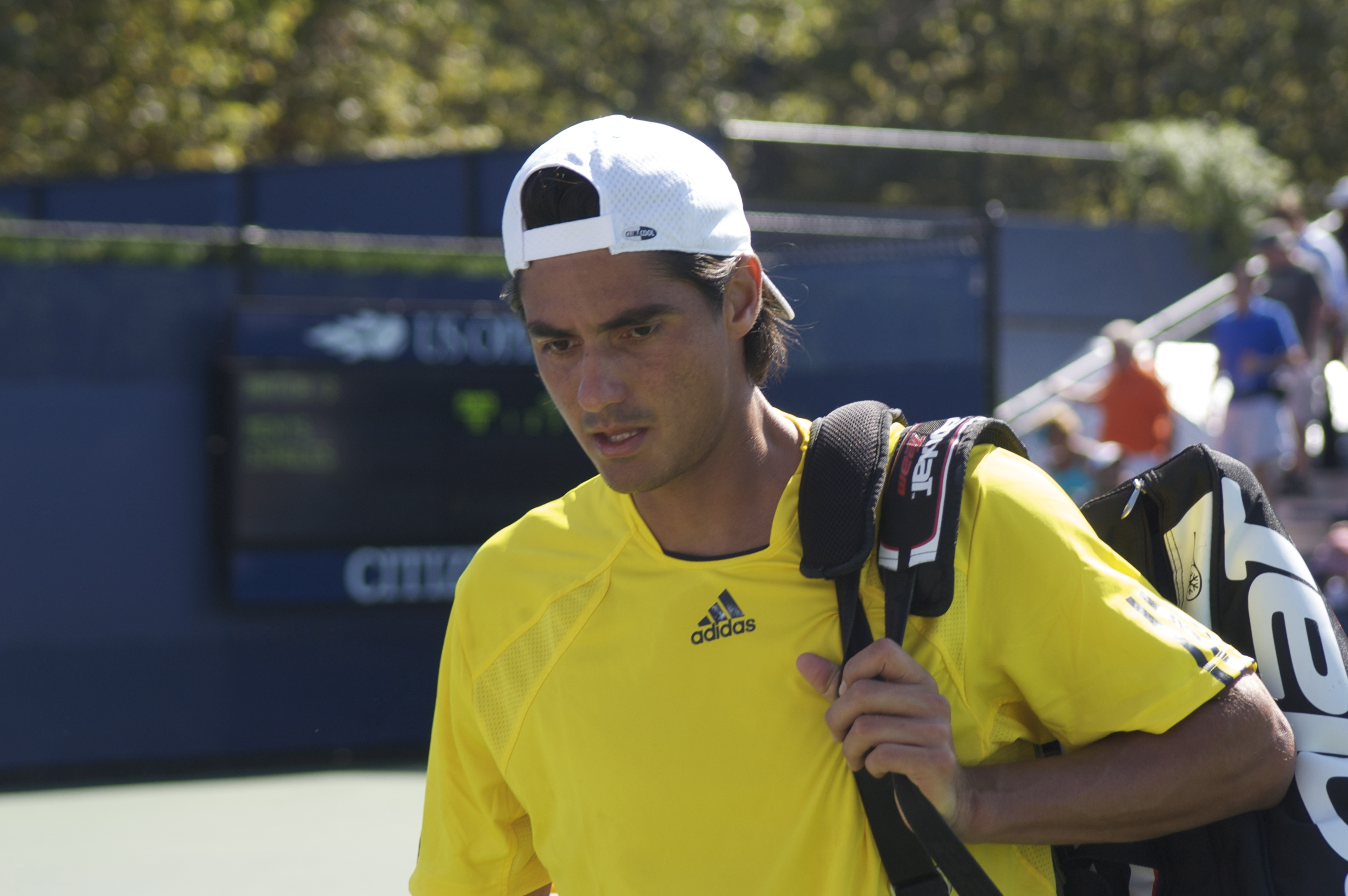
Nicolás Lapentti, former Ecuadorian tennis player of Italian descent, who became number 6 in the world in the ATP ranking.

- Paúl Ambrosi, footballer
- Ariel Graziani, footballer
- Iván Kaviedes, footballer
- Pietro Marsetti, footballer
- Rosalina Santoro, footballer
- Giannina Lattanzio, footballer
- Giovanni Lapentti, tennis player
- Nicolás Lapentti, tennis player
- Renata Moreira, beauty pageant titleholder
- César de Cesare, sprint canoeist
- Luigi Stornaiolo Pimentel, painter
- Diego Spotorno, actor and TV host
- Luis Parodi, vice president of Ecuador (1988-1992)
- Anggie Avegno, canoeist
- Yela Loffredo, sculptor
- Alicia Yánez Cossío, poet
- Ricardo Mórtola, architect
- Marieta de Veintemilla, first lady of Ecuador (1876-1883)
- Lavinia Valbonesi, first lady of Ecuador (2023-)
- Andrea Elizabeth Scacco, politician
- Doménica Tabacchi, politician
- Carolina Jaume, television actress and presenter.
- Malcolm Machiavello, actor and rapper.

== See also ==
- Italian diaspora
- Immigration to Ecuador

== Bibliography ==
- Estrada, Jenny. Los italianos de Guayaquil. Editorial Sociedad Italiana Garibaldi. Quito, 1994 (In Spanish)
- Soave, Paolo. La Scoperta Geopolitica Dell'Ecuador. Editore Franco Angeli Genova, 2008 ISBN 8846494164 (In Italian)
