= Fernando Rainieri =

Dominican tourism minister (1940–2015)

Fernando Rainieri Marranzini (1940 – October 6, 2015) was a tourism entrepreneur, minister and diplomat of the Dominican Republic. In 1986, the Dominican President Joaquin Balaguer appointed him Secretary of State (Minister) of Tourism of the Dominican Republic. He was director of the Institute for the Development of Tourism Infrastructure, president for the Americas of the World Tourism Organization (UNWTO), secretary of the Board of the Roundtable of Commonwealth countries, as well as president of the Dominican chapter of the organization Save the Children.

== Biography ==
Ranieri was born into a family tradition of hospitality: his paternal grandparents, Isidoro Ranieri and Bianca Franceschini, emigrated from northern Italy to the north of the Dominican Republic, and established two hotels, Ranieri Hotel in Puerto Plata and Hotel Trade in Santiago, and fathered more than 10 children.

His parents were Francisco Ranieri Franceschini (son of the people above) and Venice Margarita Marranzini Lepore (daughter of Italian immigrants Orazio Michelo Marranzini Inginio and Inmaccolatta Lepore Rodia, who had immigrated as children with their families, from Santa Lucia di Serino, in southern Italy). He was the brother of Frank Rainieri Marranzini, tourism entrepreneur and developer of Punta Cana, and half-brother Luis Manuel Machado Marranzini, a lawyer.

In April 2014, he was appointed Honorary Consul of Australia in the Dominican Republic.

He died of a heart attack on October 6, 2015 in Santo Domingo, hours after he returned from Spain.
