= Frank Rainieri =

Dominican businessman (born 1944)

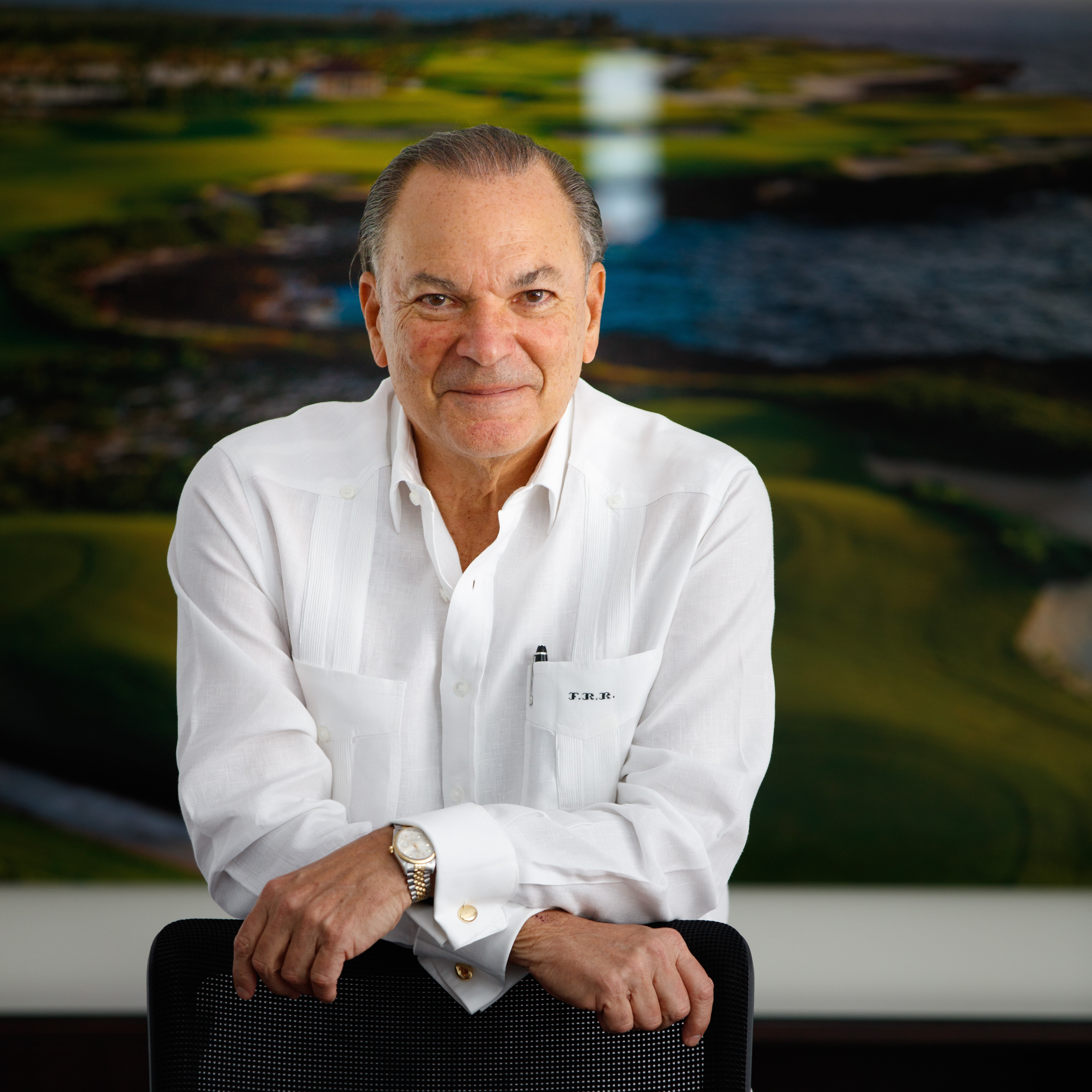
- Rainieri in 2016

Sovereign Military Order of Malta Ambassador to the Dominican Republic
- In office 17 July 2014 – 19 November 2025
- Preceded by: Francisco Rainieri
- Succeeded by: Enrique Antonio Valdez Aguilar

Personal details
- Born: Francisco Rafael Rainieri Marranzini; 24 October 1945 (age 81) Puerto Plata, Dominican Republic
- Spouse: Haydée Kuret Pacheco
- Children: Frank Elías; Paola; Francesca
- Parents: Francisco Rainieri (father); Venecia Marranzini (mother)
- Relatives: Fernando Rainieri (brother); Celso Marranzini (second-cousin)
- Education: Saint Joseph's College; Universidad APEC
- Occupation: Businessman; chairman; diplomat
- Profession: Business administrator
- Known for: Founder and developer of Punta Cana
- Awards: See list

Francisco Rafael "Frank" Rainieri Marranzini (born 24 October 1945), is a Dominican businessman in tourism industry in the Dominican Republic. He is the chairman and founder of Grupo Puntacana. In July 2021, his son Frank Elías Rainieri succeeded him as president and chief executive of the group, while Rainieri remained chairman of the board. According to Forbes, Rainieri has one of the ten largest fortunes in the Dominican Republic, with a net worth near the billion-dollar mark as of 2014. In 2015, he was designated ambassador of the Sovereign Military Order of Malta to the Dominican Republic, a position that his father also held four decades earlier.

== Early life ==
Rainieri was born in Puerto Plata into a family with tradition in hospitality. His paternal grandparents, Isidoro Rainieri and Bianca Franceschini, migrated from Bologna, northern Italy, to northern Dominican Republic, and established two hotels, one in Puerto Plata and the other in Santiago; they had more than 10 children. His parents were Francisco Rainieri (who was born in Bologna, Italy and migrated when he was a child) and Venecia Marranzini Lepore (born in San Juan de la Maguana to Italian immigrants Orazio Michelo Marranzini and Inmaccolatta Lepore, who migrated as children with their respective families, all of them natives of Santa Lucia di Serino, in southern Italy).

== Personal life ==
He went to college in Philadelphia at Saint Joseph's College, now Saint Joseph's University, finalizing them at Universidad APEC, in Santo Domingo.

He married Haydée Modesta Kuret Pacheco, whose father was a Lebanese migrant and her mother is Dominican. She was Miss Dominican Republic contestant for Miss World 1971. They are the parents of 3 children.

== Punta Cana ==
In 1969, Rainieri and Theodore Kheel acquired 58-million square meters of land on the eastern end of the Dominican Republic, which was covered with jungle and six miles of beach. Their first project was a 40 guest hotel called the Punta Cana Club, inaugurated two years later. In 1979, they constructed the Puntacana Hotel. The Punta Cana International Airport followed in 1984. In 1997, Rainieri and Kheel partnered with Oscar de la Renta and Julio Iglesias to start work on the Punta Cana Marina and the real estate development of the area.

== Grupo Puntacana History ==
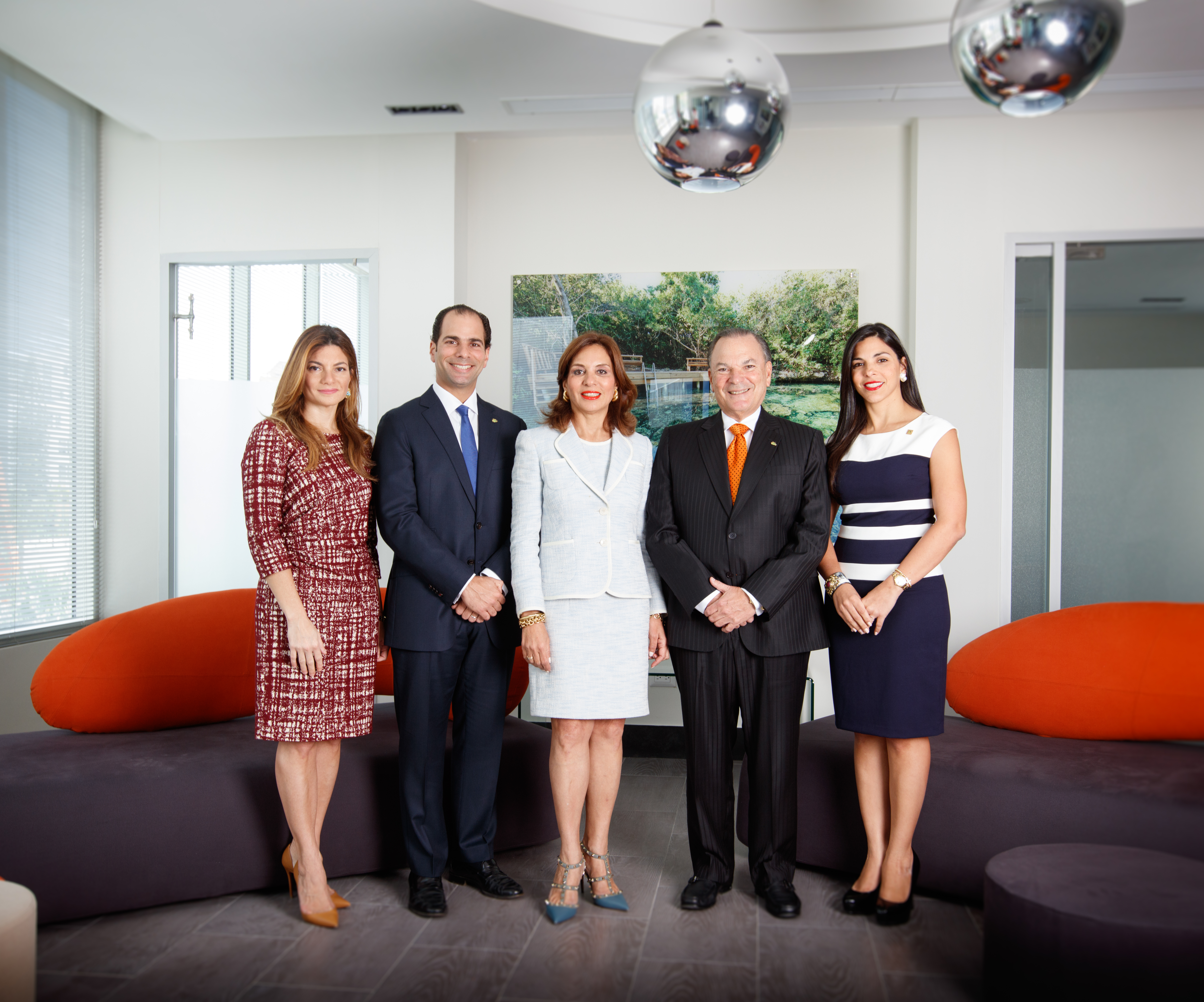
Ranieri with his family

- 1969: Ted Kheel and group of 40 partners purchase approximately 30 square miles of undeveloped land in the eastern Dominican Republic.
- 1970: Frank Rainieri (Dominican entrepreneur), Ted Kheel and partners began the development of the tourism project.
- 1971: Puntacana Resort & Club (PCRC) builds first "resort" of 10 beach cottages and clubhouse, dedication attended by President Balaguer.
- 1972: PCRC builds first elementary school in Punta Cana.
- 1977: Club Mediterranee purchases parcel of land from Puntacana Resort & Club.
- 1980: Club Med opens hotel in Punta Cana.
- 1984: Inauguration of the Punta Cana International Airport with first flight from San Juan, Puerto Rico.
- 1987: PCRC builds new Puntacana Resort & Club using thatch-roof constructions and low-impact sustainable architecture.
- 1988: Formation of the not-for-profit Puntacana Ecological Foundation (FEPC) with donation of 1,500 acres of land for ecological park and reserve (incorporation follows in 1994).
- 1992: Puntacana Ecological Foundation launches first sustainable agriculture initiative in Punta Cana (Fruit Tree Garden).
- 1996: Puntacana Foundation organized the first Concert at the Basilica Nuestra Senora de la Altagracia in the town of Higüey performed by the National Symphony Orchestra and Choir.
- 1997: Julio Iglesias and Oscar de la Renta join Kheel and Rainieri as PCRC major partners and build first homes in Corales development.
- 1998: PCRC founds a second not-for-profit organization, Puntacana Foundation (FPC) to develop social and community programs in the region.
- 2000: FPC founds bilingual, private school Puntacana International School (PCIS).
- 2001: FEPC and PCRC create Puntacana Center for Sustainability to develop research and education programs that create solutions to the environmental and social challenges facing tourism industry.
- 2004: Puntacana Foundation founds the public Ann and Ted Kheel Polytechnic School.
- 2004: Puntacana Ecological Foundation launches Puntacana Partnership for Ecological Sustainable Coastal Areas (PESCA).
- 2005: Puntacana Foundation makes its first commitment to the Clinton Global Initiative
- 2005: Puntacana Foundation Launch of co-management of Rural Clinic of Veron.
- 2005: Puntacana Foundation inaugurates the Puntacana Art Gallery jointly to Fundacion Igneri.
- 2006: Puntacana Resort & Club becomes founding member of RENAEPA, the National Network for Businesses that Protect the Environment in the Dominican Republic, now known as ECORED.
- 2006: Grupo Puntacana Foundation held the first medical mission together with Virginia College of Osteopathic Medicine (VCOM)
- 2007: Grupo Puntacana becomes a member of the United Nations Global Compact.
- 2007: Puntacana Ecological Foundation launches Zero Waste, integrated solid waste management system for Puntacana Resort & Club.
- 2008: Puntacana Foundation build and equip a police station to the community of Verón
- 2008: Puntacana Foundation launches "Carnaval de Punta Cana".
- 2009: Puntacana Ecological Foundation launches beekeeping and worm-composting projects.
- 2009: FEPC signs collaborative agreement with The Peregrine Fund to conserve the endangered Ridgway's Hawk.
- 2009: FEPC and FPC sign a collaborative agreement with Save the Children to develop community programs in the town of Veron.
- 2010: Puntacana Foundation launches the Marine Archeological Project to locate and rescue archaeologically valuable pieces from the sea for exhibition.
- 2011: Puntacana Foundation hold the first Visual Surgical Mission together with Instituto de Ciencias Visuales de España (Incivi) among other partners
- 2012: PCRC and FEPC achieve Presidential Decree naming coastal area of Puntacana Resort & Club and Cap Cana as "Marine Protected Area."
- 2014: Puntacana Foundation launches the social program Grupo Puntacana Works with the Community.
- 2014: Puntacana Foundation launches the Our lady of Punta Cana Craft Workshop
- 2015: Puntacana Foundation launches the housing project Ciudad Caracolí.
- 2016: Puntacana Ecological Foundation and Puntacana Foundation merge.
- 2017: Foundation inaugurated the Oscar de la Renta Pediatric Center facilities. The center will provide primary health care to more than 15,000 disadvantaged children from local communities.
- 2018: Creation of the Center of Marine Innovation.
- 2019: Launch of terrestrial coral nurseries.
- 2019: Launch of the Ornamental Fish Nursery Project.
- 2019: Inauguration of the Centro Educativo Caracolí.
- 2021: The board of directors appoints Frank Elías Rainieri as president and CEO of Grupo Puntacana; Frank Rainieri continues as chairman of the board and as president of the Grupo Puntacana Foundation.

== Honours ==
- Brazil:
  - Order of Rio Branco (28 November 2023)
- Italy:
  - Commander of the Order of the Star of Italy (31 January 2024)
- Dominican Republic:
  - Grand Cross with Silver Breast Star Order of Merit of Duarte, Sánchez and Mella (15 October 2025)
