= Gian Luigi Nespoli =

- Born: 1936; Varese, Italy
- Died: 2007 (age 71); Sanremo, Italy
- Occupation: Poet
- Years active: 1960–1989 in Italy; 1990-2006 in Cuba

Gian Luigi Nespoli (1936–2007) was an Italian born Italian Cuban poet and writer. He was also a member of the communist party in Italy and Cuba.

== Biography ==
Born in Varese, in the region of Lombardy (north of Italy), Nespoli has published in Italy, Germany and Cuba some twenty books of Poetry and stories, in addition to other works still unpublished. However, only in Cuba -after his transfer to the Caribbean island towards the beginning of the '90- he has had some recognitions for his poetic work: among others, in 1994 it was granted to him, in Santiago de Cuba, the important prize of poetry dedicated to the great Cuban poet Jose Maria Heredia.

In Italy, Gian Luigi Nespoli had a certain notoriety, especially in the areas of the non-institutional left, in the 1970s and 1980s, when -as a political activist and editor of various political and literary magazines, including Controinformazione - wrote verses about the struggles of the workers' and revolutionary movements of those years. He also composed verses for the struggles of the political prisoners of the left, and some of his poems were reproduced on the walls of the cells of certain Italian prisons.

In 1991 Nespoli organized, on behalf of a left-wing publishing house of Milan, Edizioni Rapporti Sociali, an anthology of poems from prison, Bisogna armare d'acciaio i canti del nostro tempo ("We must arm the songs of our time with steel"), a title that reproduces a famous verse by Ho Chi Minh. Also, in collaboration with Irina Bajini, realized the Italian edition of the book of poems "The islands and the fireflies" of the Cuban poet Jesus Cos Causse (1994). He has also translated into Italian other Cuban poets like Efraín Nadereau Maceo and Carlos Valerino García.

During his last years he lived in Santiago de Cuba, where he collaborated with the cultural institutions of the city, such as the "Caribbean House" and "Uneac" (National Union of Writers and Artists of Cuba), participating in different juries of literary prizes.

Nespoli offered many recitals of his poems - and, in general, of non-institutional poets - in Italy, Germany and Cuba. He has also been responsible for the series "Crimes against humanity" - "Auschwitz", "Hiroshima and Nagasaki", "Vietnam", "Latin America and the Caribbean" - by the Italian publishing house "Zambon". He was a supporting member of the Italy-Cuba Friendship Association.

Gian Luigi Nespoli died after a serious illness in Sanremo (Italy) on July 22, 2007.

== Works ==
in Italian

- Porta la tua pietra (poesie), 1961
- Non possiamo più sentire le voci (poesie), 1962
- Domani e' il '68 (50 fogli di diario quasi privato di un militante), 1979
- La ballata del Disvalore (poesie), in Quaderni di Nuova Cultura n.1, NCE Nuova Cultura Editrice, Milano 1980
- Metropolis (poesie), Milano 1983
- Per una compagna caduta in combattimento (poesie, "Storie di rivoluzionarie"), 1987
- L' oceano (Monografia; Poesie 1986-1988), Giuseppe Maj Editore, Milano 1989
- Tu eres Santiago (song with lyrics in Italian by Gian Luigi Nespoli and music by the guitarist and composer Carlo Zannetti ), 2006

in Spanish

- Poemas de Santiago (Uneac, Santiago de Cuba 1994)
- En el mismo río no se puede entrar dos veces - Glosas sobre Heráclito (poemas, Santiago de Cuba 1996)
- Diez cantos para el Che - Una alegoría al Che (poemas, Casa del Caribe, Santiago de Cuba 1997)
- El mar / Il mare (poemas, edición bilingüe, Santiago de Cuba 1998)
- Nadie / Nessuno (poemas, edición bilingüe, Editorial Arte y Literatura, La Habana 1999; Zambon editora, Frankfurt 2002)

== See also ==
- Italian Cubans
