= José Miguel Bonetti =

Dominican businessman (born 1938)

José Miguel Bonetti GCSG
- Born: 25 February 1938 (age 88); Santo Domingo, Dominican Republic
- Education: (BEc) Wharton School of the University of Pennsylvania (Juris Doctor) Autonomous University of Santo Domingo
- Known for: Entrepreneurial leadership
- Board member of: MercaSID
- Spouse: Consuelo Amelia Dubreil Bancalari (wid.)
- Children: Ana Cristina, Ligia Consuelo, and José Miguel
- Awards: Order of Merit of Duarte, Sánchez and Mella, Grand Cross of the Order of St. Gregory the Great, Order of Christopher Columbus

José Miguel Bonetti Guerra GCSG (born 25 February 1938, in Santo Domingo) is a businessman from the Dominican Republic. He was the chairman of Grupo Sociedad Industrial Dominicana (Grupo SID) for more than 45 years until 2015, when he was succeeded by his daughter Ligia Bonetti. According to Forbes, Bonetti's is among the ten largest fortunes in the Dominican Republic, with a net worth near one billion dollars as of 2014. He is also part of the President's Leadership Council for the Inter-American Dialogue.

Bonetti Guerra was born to the politician José María Bonetti Burgos and his wife, Ligia Guerra.
