= Santa Lucia di Serino =

- Comune
- Comune di Santa Lucia di Serino
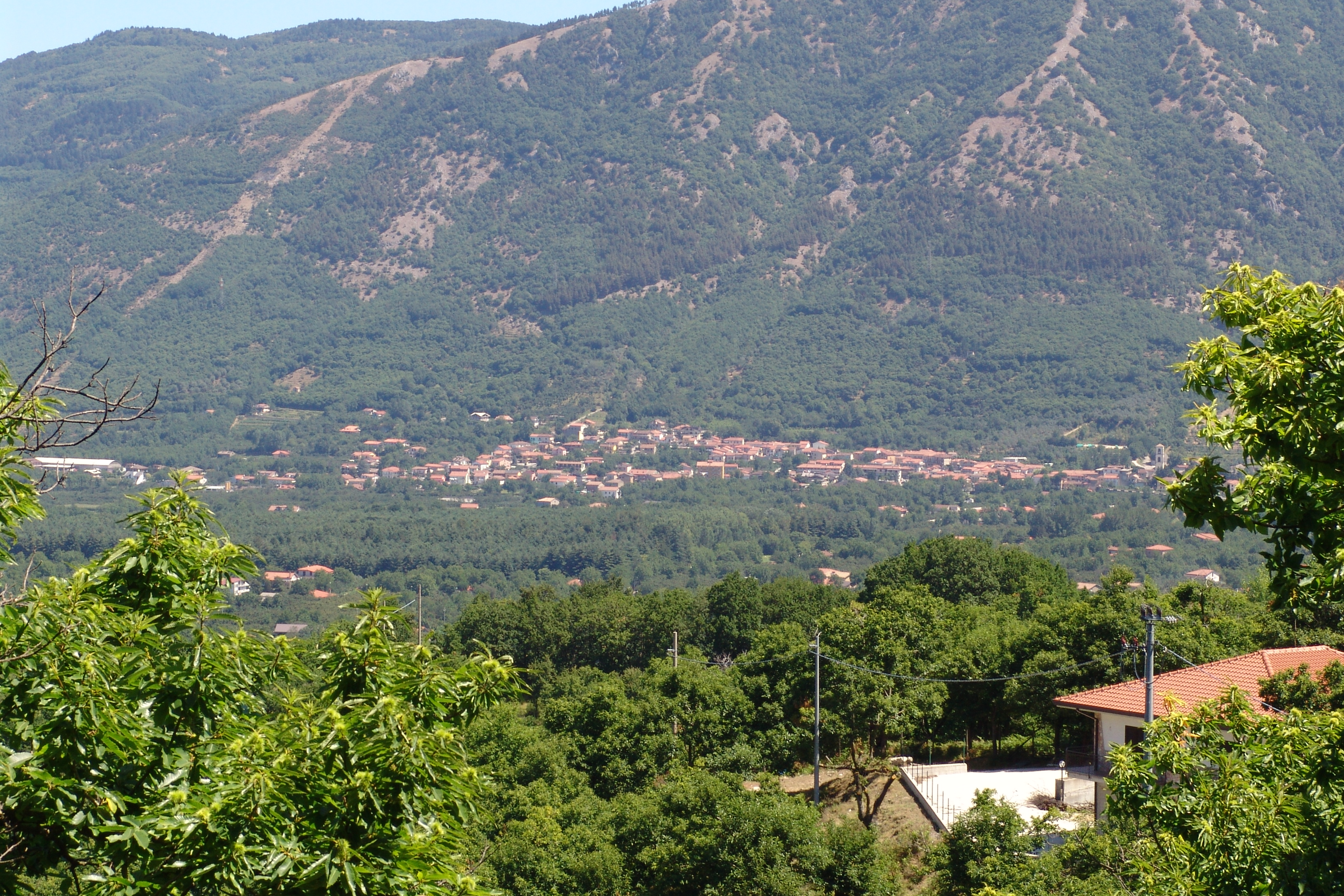

- Coat of arms

- Location within Italy Location within Campania
- Coordinates: 40°52′N 14°52′E
- Country: Italy
- Region: Campania
- Province: Avellino (AV)
- Frazioni: San Michele di Serino, Santo Stefano del Sole, Serino

Government
  - Mayor: Fenisia Mariconda

Area
  - Total: 3 km^{2} (1.2 sq mi)
- Elevation: 400 m (1,300 ft)

Population (31 December 2010)
  - Total: 1,460
  - Density: 490/km^{2} (1,300/sq mi)
- Time zone: UTC+1 (CET)
  - Summer (DST): UTC+2 (CEST)
- Postal code: 83020
- Dialing code: 0825
- ISTAT code: 064088
- Patron saint: Saint Lucy
- Saint day: 13 December
- Website: Official website

Santa Lucia di Serino is a town and comune in the province of Avellino, Campania, southern Italy.
