= Italian Hondurans =

Honduran citizens of Italian descent

Italo-honduregni (Italian) Ítalo-hondureños (Spanish)
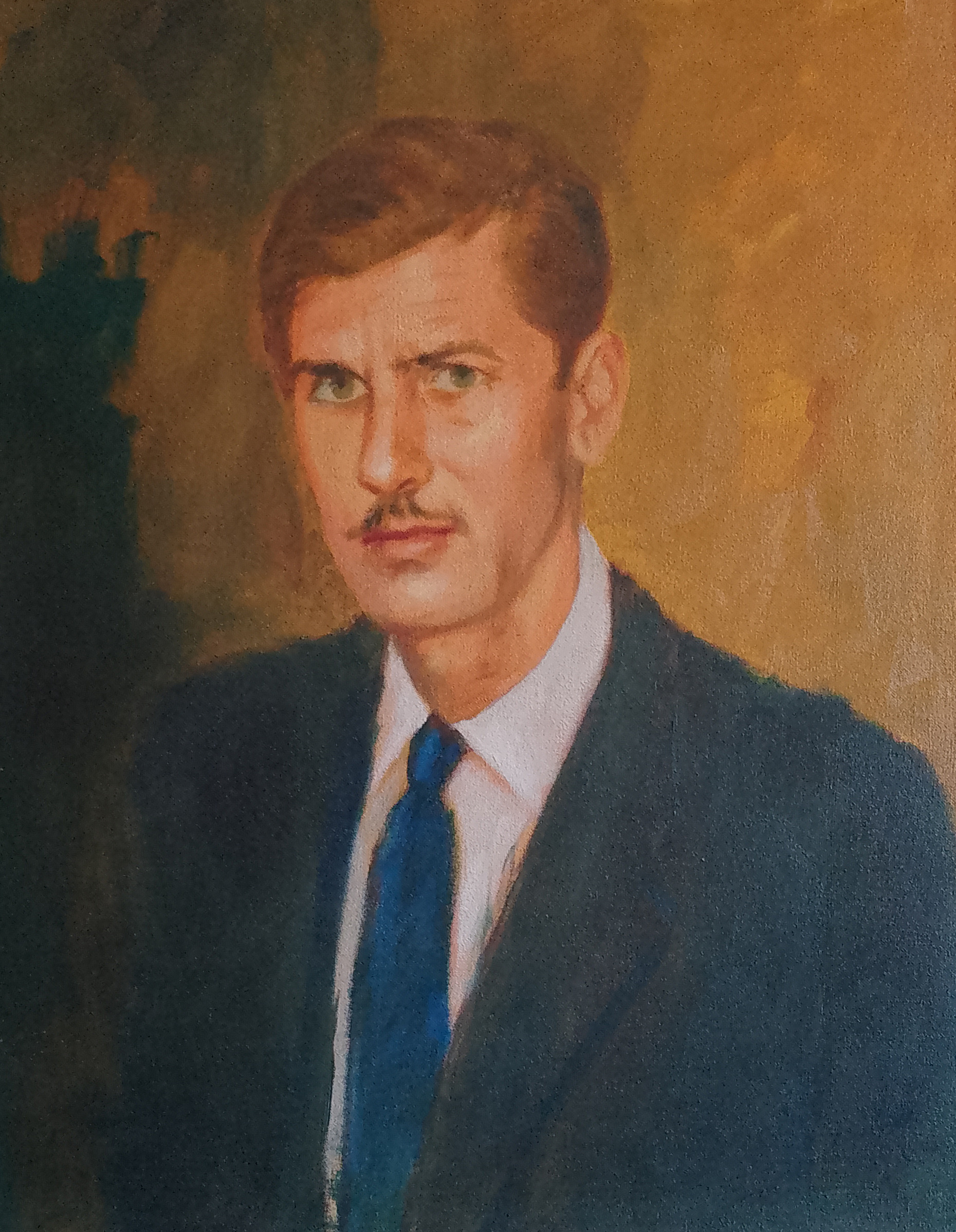
- Hector Caraccioli, Italian Honduran colonel

Total population
- c. 400 (by birth) c. 14,000 (by ancestry)

Regions with significant populations
- Tegucigalpa, San Pedro Sula and Yuscarán

Languages
- Honduran Spanish · Italian and Italian dialects

Religion
- Roman Catholic

Related ethnic groups
- Italians, Italian Americans, Italian Argentines, Italian Bolivians, Italian Brazilians, Italian Canadians, Italian Chileans, Italian Colombians, Italian Costa Ricans, Italian Cubans, Italian Dominicans, Italian Ecuadorians, Italian Guatemalans, Italian Haitians, Italian Mexicans, Italian Panamanians, Italian Paraguayans, Italian Peruvians, Italian Puerto Ricans, Italian Salvadorans, Italian Uruguayans, Italian Venezuelans

Italian Hondurans (Italian: italo-honduregni; Spanish: ítalo-hondureños) are Honduran-born citizens who are fully or partially of Italian descent, whose ancestors were Italians who emigrated to Honduras during the Italian diaspora, or Italian-born people in Honduras.

== History ==
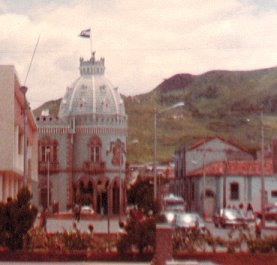
Former Presidential House of Honduras from 1924 to 1989, built by Italian Honduran architect Augusto Bressani

In the 19th century, Lieutenant Colonel Feliciano Viviani of Italian origin appeared in the ranks of the allied army, protector of Central American law, under the command of Francisco Morazán. Viviani would die in the battle of Omoa in 1832.

In the year 1853, the European traveler of English nationality Mary Lester arrived in Comayagua and recorded that several foreign families resided in Honduras, adding also that in the south of the country, in Nacaome, Aramecina and Langue, there were Italian immigrants who managed tavern, inns and lodgings.

In the general census of the Republic of Honduras, carried out on 15 June 1887, foreigners were summarized as 185 North Americans, 77 Spaniards, 72 French, 1,033 English, 43 Germans, 4 Russians, 2 Swiss, 13 Italians, 4 Belgians, 2 Danes, 1 Dutch, 1 Portuguese, 1 Brazilian and 1 Chinese.

The influx of Italian citizens to settle in the Republic of Honduras became evident within the first three decades of the 20th century. Among them stood out businessmen, architects, aviators, engineers, artists in various fields, etc. In 1911 the participation of immigrants in the development of the country began to be evident, especially families from Europe (Germany, Italy, France). The main marketing items were coffee, bananas, precious woods, gold and silver.

The count of immigrants residing in Honduras, according to reports between 1887 and 1935, showed that:

Year	Country of origin	Number of immigrants	Total immigrants that year
1887	Italy	50	1,444
1910	Italy	94	6,211
1926	Italy	322	8,261
1930	Italy	166	6,531
1935	Italy	180	7,204

When World War II broke out, under the presidency of Tiburcio Carías Andino, was issued decree no. 5 of 13 December 1941, with which the Republic of Honduras declared war on Nazi Germany and on Kingdom of Italy; but the Italian citizens did not receive limitations and harassment from the Honduran government, such as that received by German immigrants.

Paul Vinelli

The Honduran government has once again strengthened the ties of friendship with today's Italian Republic, after the end of World War II, with the same diplomatic gestures that are currently evidenced by the mutual collaboration between governments. In 2014, there were about 14,000 Hondurans of Italian descent, while there were around 400 Italian citizens.

== Notable Italian Hondurans ==
- Roberto Micheletti, politician
- Paul Vinelli, economist and banker
- Maria Josefa Lastiri, lawyer and former first lady of Honduras

== See also ==
- Italian diaspora
- Honduras-Italy relations
- Immigration to Honduras

== Bibliography ==
- Bocchicio, Luca. Il contributo italiano all'immagine monumentale —scultorea e architettonica— dell'Indipendenza in Honduras. 2015 (In Italian)
- Murga Frassinetti, Antonio. Enclave y Sociedad en Honduras. UNAH, Tegucigalpa, Honduras, 1978 (In Spanish)
