= German Hondurans =

Total population
- Unknown (562 German immigrants in 2014)

Regions with significant populations
- San Pedro Sula, Southern and central Honduras

Languages
- Spanish, German

Related ethnic groups
- German people, German Americans, German Argentines, German Brazilians, German Canadians, German Chileans, German Mexicans, German Paraguayans, German Peruvians, German Puerto Ricans, German Uruguayans, German Venezuelans

The migration of German citizens to Honduras began in the 19th century. For Europeans, arriving in any new country of the New World meant their "American Dream," but today the term has evolved to refer to migration to the United States. Honduras has approximately 5,100 descendants of Germans.

== History ==
=== Pre-World War I ===
When General Luis Bográn was president (1883 – 1891), greater importance was given to foreigners arriving in the national territory. Thus, Bográn appointed Antonio R. Vallejo to conduct a general census of the Republic of Honduras, which was carried out on June 15, 1887. It recorded the following foreigners in Honduras: 185 North Americans, 77 Spaniards, 72 French, 1,033 English, 43 Germans, 4 Russians, 2 Swiss, 13 Italians, 4 Belgians, 2 Danes, 1 Dutchman, 1 Portuguese, 1 Brazilian, and 1 Chinese, not counting Central Americans and other Latin Americans such as Mexicans and Colombians.

On April 1, 1895, a new Immigration Law was issued, which was taken advantage of by many citizens Americans, Italians, Germans, English, French, and later Arabs and Chinese.

From the late 19th century, Germans sought places where they could live comfortably and receive better treatment. They chose to settle in Guatemala, Honduras, El Salvador, and northern Nicaragua in Central America. Most of the new commercial and industrial areas in Honduras primarily housed German communities and, to a lesser extent, other European and Arab immigrants. Germans settled in southern and central Honduras, as well as in significant numbers in the city of San Pedro Sula.

It was in 1906 that Honduras issued its first Immigration Law of the 20th century, establishing the legal framework that facilitated the arrival of foreigners. These immigrants arrived over the next three decades, settling primarily in areas with favorable conditions for exporting goods, thus leading to the establishment of family-run businesses. By 1911, the immigrants' contribution to the country's development was evident, particularly families from Europe (Germany, Italy, and France). Their main exports were coffee, bananas, precious woods, gold, and silver.

=== Interwar Period (World War I and World War II) ===
In 1918, Honduras declared war on Germany and confiscated the property of German citizens living in Honduras, under pressure from the United States of America; President Francisco Bertrand Barahona resigned from office and had previously denounced the United States' intervention in Honduras' internal affairs. The confiscated German commercial and economic properties in the south and center of the country had a negative impact on the Honduran nation. In southern Honduras, Amapala and its port were controlled by German families. Agriculture and livestock farming were at their peak in German hands, while in Choluteca, the Germans established a sugar mill and a brewery.

Regarding the Honduran Army, the rulers of the early 20th century hired German officers for the military schools, and Prussian-style instruction was mandatory for Honduran citizens. The cadets excelled in their European marching style long before American instruction was officially implemented.

In 1919, Nazario Soriano, Honduran Consul in the United States, presidential candidate for the National Party of Honduras, and brother-in-law of President Barahona, denounced in the newspaper La Nación that his political adversaries had close ties to Germans and their companies based in Honduras.

Immigrants from Europe, Asia, and the Americas were recognized within the Freemasonry brotherhood in Honduras, including those of German origin: Andrés Grombach, Carlos Hartling, and Carlos H. Lubbe, among others.

In the 1920s, a proposal emerged for a new racial mixing, which sought to bring about the biological mixing of Honduran peasants and indigenous people with Scandinavian, German, French, and English citizens. This would be the means to construct a new race of Hondurans: enterprising, hardworking, honest, law-abiding, morally impeccable, and physically beautiful, among other qualities.

The Archdiocese of Tegucigalpa was taken over in 1923 by Bishop Agustín Hombach, of German origin, who led it until his death in 1933.

Under the presidential administration of Vicente Mejía Colindres, the new Immigration Law of 1929 was enacted. The law brought with it racism and xenophobia between Honduran citizens and immigrants. The aim was to stem the flow of Arab, Chinese, and Black immigrants and promote the arrival of white Europeans. While the then-new Immigration Law of 1935, issued during the presidency of Tiburcio Carías Andino, favored Arab and Palestinian immigration. In the same year, a census of immigrants already settled in Honduras was conducted. According to reports, between 1887 and 1935, there were Jews in the country, but not Central Americans. the following:

Year	Country of origin	Number of immigrants	Total immigrants that year
1887	Germany	43	1444
1910	Germany	177	6211
1926	Germany	246	8261
1930	Germany	289	6531
1935	Germany	324	7204

Many Jews who arrived in Honduras were undoubtedly mostly of German origin. These individuals entered the country with express permission from the Presidential Palace. In 1939, 455 Germans entered, 95 of whom were Jewish.

By Decree No. 5 of December 13, 1941, the Republic of Honduras declared war on the German Reich and Italy. Previously, by Decree No. 2 of December 9 of that year, a similar decision had been made with respect to the Empire of Japan. General Carías Andino expelled the German consul, Christian Zincer, from Honduras, because he considered him a "fifth columnist in Central America with ties to the Gestapo." The Honduran government confiscated the properties of Germans in the country, a situation that benefited Arab immigrants, all because of the world war. For example, J. A. Nasser bought a property belonging to Mr. Sierke, located in Catacamas, Olancho, at auction for a bid of 2,000 Lempiras. Many properties owned by Germans were auctioned off in Honduras during those years. The German immigrants themselves were not to blame for the Nazi policies implemented by Adolf Hitler. While it is true that many young Germans born in America were seduced by Hitler's oratory and crossed the ocean to join his ranks, a greater number of Germans repudiated those expansionist actions and were stripped of their property, and some of them were even sent to concentration camps in the United States of America.

=== From 1945 onwards ===
Once World War II ended, Honduras, a member of the Allied Pact signed at the request of the United States, Europe, and Latin American countries, was forced to reinvent its immigration policy in anticipation of a new wave of migration that would also contribute to the country's development. This period also saw the end of the republican dictatorship of Carías Andino in 1949. In this year, Juan Manuel Gálvez, a lawyer and military officer (who had served as Minister of War under Carías Andino), assumed the presidency.

Honduras re-established international relations with the Federal Republic of Germany (after World War II, Germany was divided into the Federal Republic of Germany and the German Democratic Republic). Following the reunification of Germany in the 1990s, the bonds of friendship between Germany and Honduras strengthened even further, continuing to this day.

According to Honduras' 2014 national census, the nation had 562 Germans residing there.

== German surnames in Honduras ==
Appel, Bennaton, Berhnard, Clamer, Cornelsen, Drawert, Drechsel, Eder, Ehrler, Friedrich, Gaekel, Gauggel, Gehlaar, Hess, Hesse, Hoffman, Hadrych, Kohncke, Loewenberg, Mahler, Maier, Ochmann, Reichmann, Róssner, Rauscher, Schultz, Schumaker, Schweinfurth, Sebmeyer, Siedel, Sierke, Thuman, Wettstein, Weizenblut, Schoenherr. Von Eicken, Schuarzbawer, Boemer, Wellermann, Zeitung

== See also ==
- Germany–Honduras relations
