= Vinelli =

Vinelli is a surname. Notable people with the surname include:

- Felice Vinelli (1774–1825), Italian painter
- Paul Vinelli (1922–1997), Italian-American-Honduran economist
