= Embassy of Taiwan, Tegucigalpa =

Political representative office in Tegucigalpa, Honduras

Embassy of the Republic of China (Taiwan) in Honduras 中華民國駐宏都拉斯大使館 Embajada de la República de China (Taiwán) en Honduras
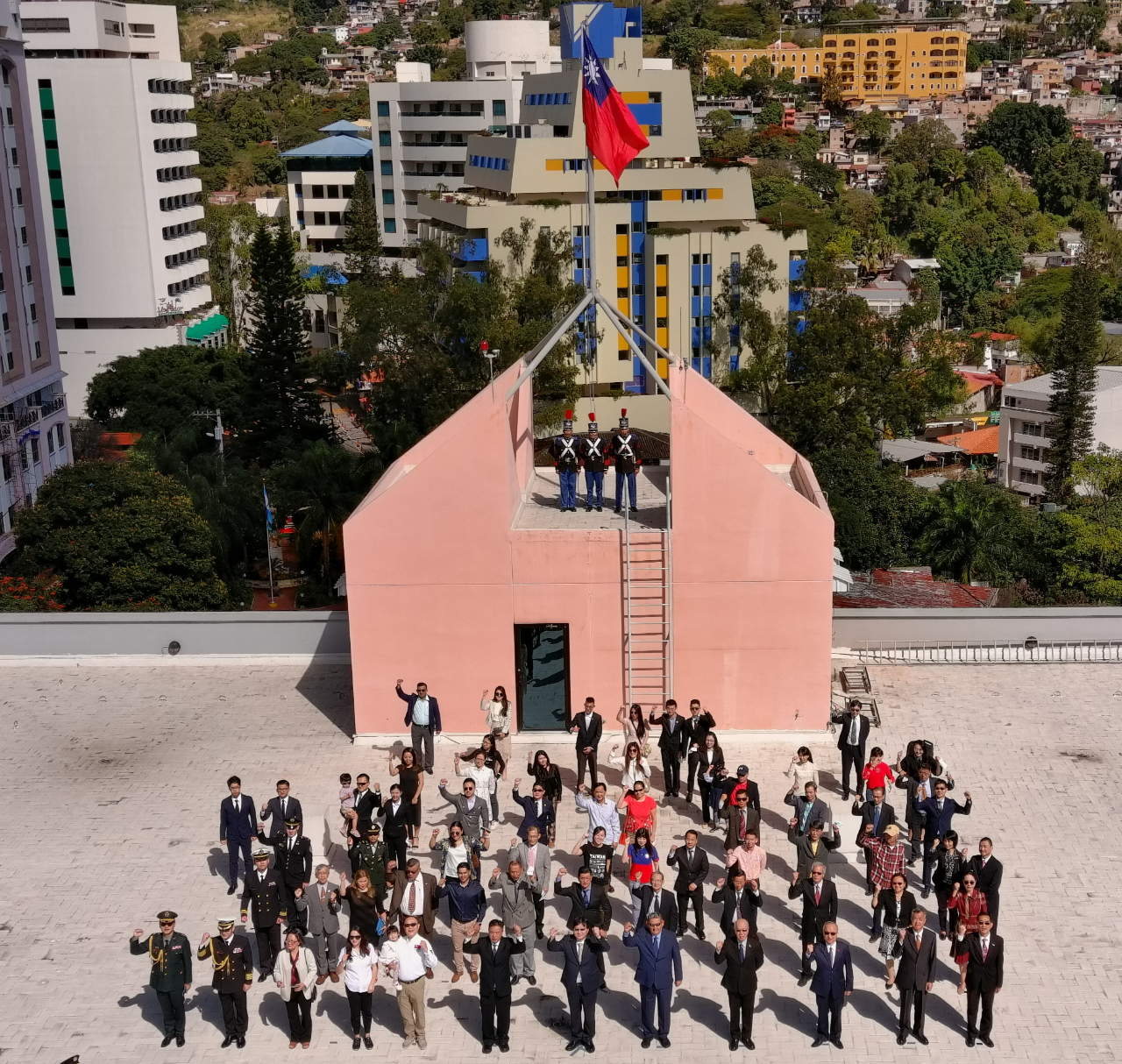
- Location: Tegucigalpa
- Jurisdiction: Honduras
- Website: Embassy of the Republic of China (Taiwan) in Honduras

The Embassy of the Republic of China (Taiwan) in Honduras was the embassy of the Republic of China (ROC; commonly called Taiwan) in Tegucigalpa, Honduras. The two countries had established diplomatic relations in 1941. It ended in 2023 when Honduras shifted diplomatic recognition to the People's Republic of China. Honduras was one of the 14 countries that recognise the ROC.

The embassy also had responsibility for Costa Rica and Nicaragua. Both of these countries had switched their diplomatic relations to the People's Republic of China in 2007 and 2021 respectively.

Its counterpart body in Taiwan was the Embassy of Honduras in Taipei.

== History ==
Diplomatic relations were established between the two countries on 9 April 1941, and the exchange of ministers between the two countries began in the form of joint control by the legation in Panama. In June 1957, the Legation of the Republic of China in Honduras was established in Tegucigalpa, and in 1962, the Minister Extraordinary and Plenipotentiary began to reside there. On 20 May 1965, the Embassy of the Republic of China in Honduras was inaugurated in the form of mutual promotion with the Legation of the Republic of China in Honduras.

On 14 March 2023, Honduran President Xiomara Castro announced that she had directed her foreign minister to begin the process of opening official relations with the People's Republic of China. On 26 March, Honduras formally broke ties with Taiwan, and therefore closed their diplomatic offices and established diplomatic ties with the People's Republic of China.

== See also ==
- List of diplomatic missions of Taiwan
- List of diplomatic missions in Honduras
- Taipei Economic and Cultural Representative Office
