= Colombia–Honduras relations =

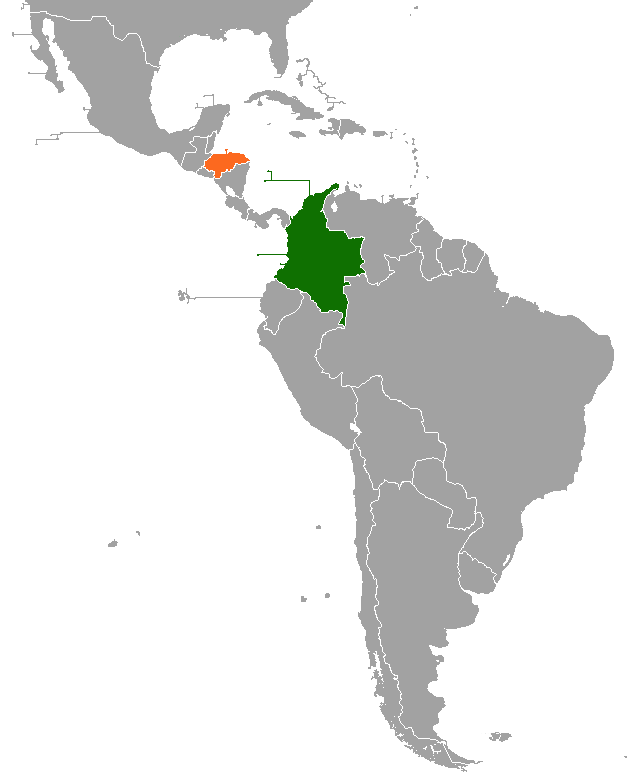

- Colombia: Honduras

Diplomatic mission
- Embassy of Colombia in Tegucigalpa: Embassy of Honduras in Bogotá

The Republic of Colombia and the Republic of Honduras have maintained a friendly relationship since the 19th century.

== History ==
Both governments established diplomatic relations in 1825. In 1980, both countries signed the Joint Commission on Drugs. Colombia chaired the session that allowed Honduras to re-enter the Organization of American States in 2011.

== Bilateral agreements ==
The two nations have signed several bilateral agreements such as a Cultural Agreement celebrated between the Government of the Republic of Colombia and the Government of the Republic of Honduras (1961); Exchange of Notes Constituting a Reciprocity Agreement on the Elimination of Visas in Diplomatic and Official Passports and Equivalents (1963); Administrative Agreement Between the Republic of Colombia and the Republic of Honduras for the prevention, control and repression of the illegal use and trafficking of narcotic and psychotropic substances (1980); Agreement on technical and scientific cooperation between the Republic of Colombia and the Republic of Honduras (1980); Economic and Commercial Cooperation Agreement Between the Government of the Republic of Colombia and the Government of the Republic of Honduras (1983); Partial Scope Agreement between the Republic of Colombia and the Republic of Honduras (1984); Treaty on Maritime Delimitation between the Republic of Colombia and the Republic of Honduras (1986); Technical Cooperation Agreement on child assistance between the Republic of Colombia and the Republic of Honduras (1992); Cultural and Educational Treaty between the Government of the Republic of Colombia and the Government of the Republic of Honduras (1999); Agreement on technical, scientific and technological cooperation between the Government of the Republic of Colombia and the Government of Honduras (2003); Agreement between the Government of the Republic of Colombia and the Government of the Republic of Honduras on the Free Exercise of Remunerated Activities for Dependent Family Members of Diplomatic Consular, Administrative and Technical Staff of Diplomatic Missions and Consular Offices (2005); Agreement between the Government of the Republic of Colombia and the Government of the Republic of Honduras regarding the Reciprocal Elimination of Visa Requirements on Current Passports (2007); Administrative Agreement between the Government of the Republic of Colombia and the Government of the Republic of Honduras complementary to the Basic Agreement on Technical Cooperation of 1980 on Technical Cooperation in the field of Biofuels (2009) and an Agreement between the Government of the Republic of Colombia and the Government of the Republic of Honduras on the prevention of the illegal import, export and transfer of cultural property (2016).

== Economic relations ==
Colombia exported products worth 95,676 thousand dollars, the main products being chemicals, machinery and agro-industrial products; while Honduras exported products worth 44,768 thousand dollars, the main products being coffee, clothing and agricultural products.

In 2022, Honduras exported $67.2M to Colombia. The products exported from Honduras to Colombia were composed of Coffee ($27.5M), Scented Mixtures ($12.2M), and Corn ($5.66M). Colombia exported $126M to Honduras. The products exported from Colombia to Honduras included Refrigerators ($15.3M), Pesticides ($8.26M), and Packaged Medicaments ($7.47M).

== Diplomatic representation ==
- Colombia has an embassy in Tegucigalpa.
- Honduras has an embassy in Bogotá.
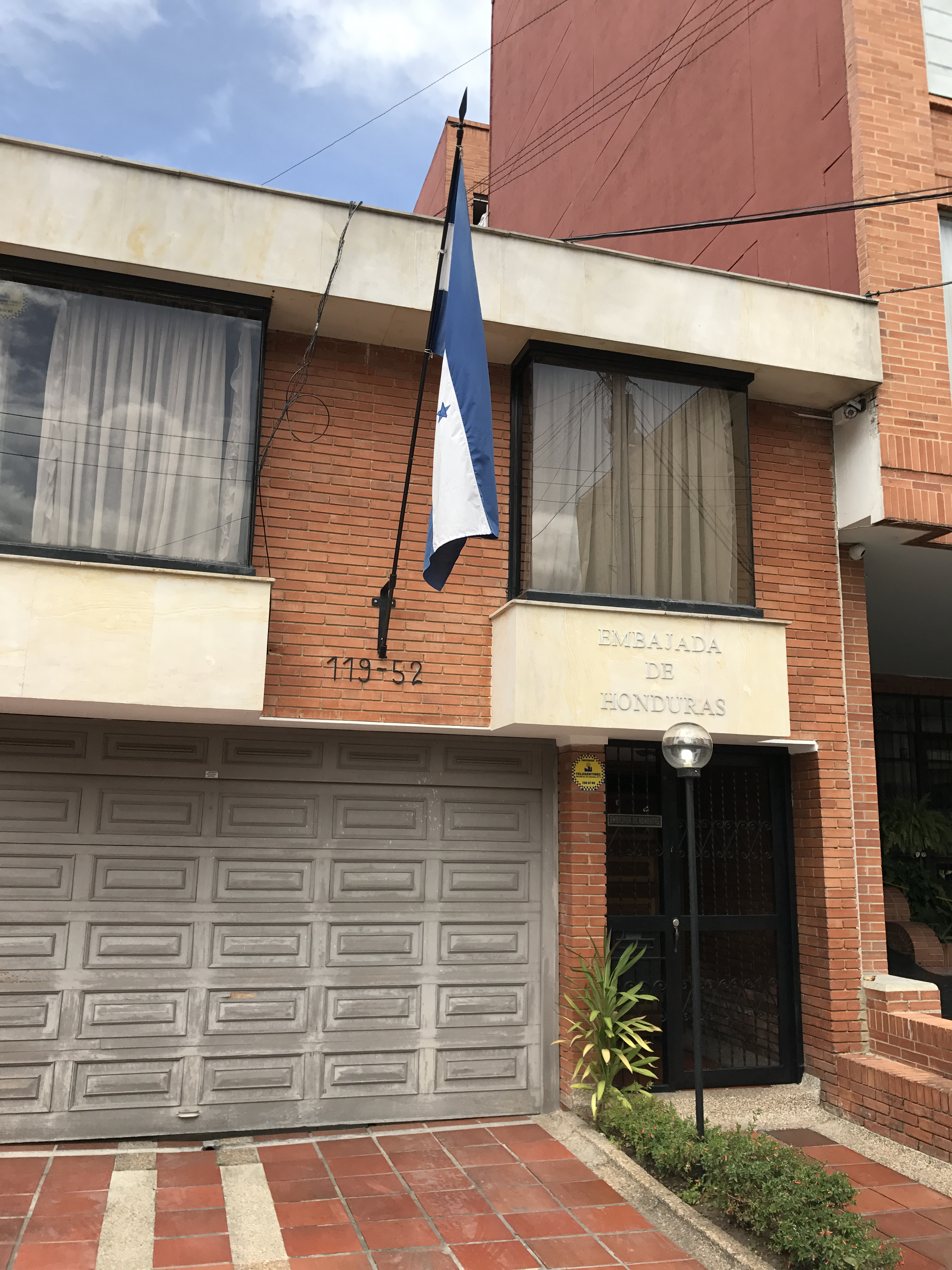
Embassy of Honduras in Bogotá

== See also ==
- Foreign relations of Colombia
- Foreign relations of Honduras
