= Foreign relations of Honduras =

Honduras is a member of the United Nations, the World Trade Organization (WTO), the Central American Parliament (PARLACEN), the Central American Integration System (SICA), and the Central American Security Commission (CASQ). During 1995–96, Honduras, a founding member of the United Nations, for the first time served as a non-permanent member of the United Nations Security Council. Honduras is also a member of the International Criminal Court with a Bilateral Immunity Agreement of protection for the US-military (as covered under Article 98).

Honduras has been a member of the Forum of Small States (FOSS) since the group's founding in 1992.

== Central American relations ==
President Flores consulted frequently with the other Central American presidents on issues of mutual interest. He continued his predecessor's strong emphasis on Central American cooperation and integration, which resulted in an agreement easing border controls and tariffs among Honduras, Guatemala, Nicaragua, and El Salvador. Honduras also joined its six Central American neighbors at the 1994 Summit of the Americas in signing the Alliance for Sustainable Development, known as the Conjunta Centroamerica-USA, or CONCAUSA, to promote sustainable economic development in the region. Honduras held the 6-month SICA presidency during the second half of 1998.

At the 17th Central American Summit in 1995, hosted by Honduras in the northern city of San Pedro Sula, the region's six countries (excluding Belize) signed treaties creating confidence- and security-building measures and combating the smuggling of stolen automobiles in the isthmus. In subsequent summits (held every 6 months), Honduras has continued to work with the other Central American countries on issues of common concern.

== Diplomatic relations ==
List of countries which Honduras maintains diplomatic relations with:

| # | Country | Date |
|---|---|---|
| 1 | Colombia | 8 March 1825 |
| 2 | Costa Rica | 1 July 1839 |
| 3 | Guatemala | 21 March 1847 |
| 4 | United Kingdom | 16 June 1849 |
| 5 | United States | 19 April 1853 |
| 6 | France | 22 February 1856 |
| 7 | Peru | 22 January 1857 |
| 8 | Belgium | 27 March 1858 |
| 9 | Italy | 25 February 1864 |
| 10 | Nicaragua | 1864 |
| 11 | Chile | 29 March 1866 |
| 12 | Dominican Republic | 17 December 1877 |
| 13 | Mexico | 26 February 1879 |
| 14 | Venezuela | 22 June 1891 |
| 15 | Spain | 11 June 1896 |
| 16 | Ecuador | 1896 |
| 17 | Cuba | 24 November 1903 |
| 18 | Brazil | 16 November 1906 |
| 19 | Panama | 18 September 1907 |
| — | Holy See | 19 December 1908 |
| 20 | Argentina | 20 August 1928 |
| 21 | Uruguay | 11 January 1929 |
| 22 | Czech Republic | 12 March 1930 |
| 23 | Poland | 18 November 1933 |
| 24 | Japan | 20 February 1935 |
| 25 | Sweden | 10 January 1936 |
| 26 | Netherlands | 16 March 1946 |
| 27 | Denmark | 19 April 1946 |
| 28 | Philippines | 5 July 1946 |
| 29 | Norway | 3 July 1947 |
| 30 | Paraguay | 22 March 1949 |
| 31 | Israel | January 1950 |
| 32 | Turkey | 21 September 1950 |
| 33 | Lebanon | 16 January 1951 |
| 34 | Serbia | 1 August 1951 |
| 35 | Austria | 20 February 1952 |
| 36 | Switzerland | 12 August 1957 |
| 37 | Portugal | 20 October 1958 |
| 38 | Germany | 20 January 1960 |
| 39 | Canada | June 1961 |
| 40 | South Korea | 1 April 1962 |
| 41 | Greece | 2 July 1965 |
| 42 | Hungary | 2 July 1973 |
| 43 | Romania | 11 July 1973 |
| 44 | Jamaica | 10 March 1975 |
| 45 | Finland | 30 January 1976 |
| 46 | Luxembourg | 6 July 1978 |
| 47 | Suriname | 1 March 1979 |
| 48 | Belize | 21 September 1982 |
| 49 | Australia | 4 December 1983 |
| 50 | Morocco | 1 May 1985 |
| 51 | Singapore | 5 July 1985 |
| 52 | Thailand | 16 December 1985 |
| 53 | Egypt | 5 August 1986 |
| 54 | New Zealand | February 1988 |
| 55 | Saint Vincent and the Grenadines | 2 August 1989 |
| 56 | Russia | 30 September 1990 |
| 57 | Brunei | 20 December 1991 |
| 58 | Guyana | 1 May 1992 |
| 59 | Kuwait | 7 June 1992 |
| 60 | Barbados | 7 December 1992 |
| 61 | Bahamas | 1992 |
| 62 | Trinidad and Tobago | 2 June 1994 |
| 63 | India | 28 September 1994 |
| 64 | Burkina Faso | 30 September 1994 |
| 65 | Algeria | 21 October 1994 |
| 66 | Azerbaijan | 22 December 1994 |
| 67 | Kazakhstan | 28 November 1995 |
| 68 | Cambodia | 26 February 1996 |
| 69 | United Arab Emirates | 26 February 1996 |
| 70 | South Africa | 4 March 1996 |
| 71 | Slovenia | 25 March 1996 |
| 72 | North Macedonia | 25 April 1996 |
| 73 | Jordan | 23 July 1996 |
| 74 | Andorra | 18 September 1996 |
| 75 | Indonesia | 24 September 1997 |
| 76 | Croatia | 20 September 1999 |
| 77 | Ireland | 11 December 1999 |
| 78 | Bahrain | 28 August 2000 |
| 79 | Saudi Arabia | 28 September 2000 |
| 80 | Belarus | 20 May 2002 |
| 81 | Ukraine | 18 September 2002 |
| 82 | Bolivia | 21 September 2002 |
| 83 | Estonia | 5 February 2003 |
| 84 | Latvia | 1 July 2003 |
| 85 | Slovakia | 27 May 2004 |
| 86 | Bulgaria | 7 May 2004 |
| 87 | Malta | 8 June 2004 |
| 88 | Iceland | 15 September 2004 |
| 89 | Lithuania | 26 January 2005 |
| 90 | Cyprus | 7 February 2005 |
| 91 | Vietnam | 17 May 2005 |
| 92 | Nepal | 16 August 2006 |
| 93 | Uzbekistan | 26 April 2007 |
| 94 | Libya | 12 July 2007 |
| 95 | Botswana | 19 July 2007 |
| 96 | Montenegro | 7 July 2010 |
| 97 | Albania | 2 September 2010 |
| — | Kosovo | 2 September 2010 |
| 98 | Bosnia and Herzegovina | 14 September 2010 |
| 99 | Senegal | 14 February 2011 |
| 100 | Monaco | 25 February 2011 |
| 101 | Georgia | 9 March 2011 |
| 102 | Zambia | 8 August 2011 |
| 103 | Ghana | 29 August 2011 |
| 104 | Mauritius | 8 September 2011 |
| 105 | Armenia | 16 September 2011 |
| 106 | Maldives | 13 October 2011 |
| 107 | Mongolia | 19 October 2011 |
| 108 | Qatar | 17 May 2012 |
| 109 | Haiti | 3 August 2012 |
| 110 | Sri Lanka | 12 March 2013 |
| — | State of Palestine | 10 May 2013 |
| 111 | Grenada | 6 June 2013 |
| 112 | Malaysia | 7 August 2013 |
| 113 | Nigeria | 25 September 2013 |
| 114 | San Marino | 16 December 2013 |
| 115 | Pakistan | 14 January 2014 |
| 116 | Dominica | 5 June 2014 |
| 117 | Saint Lucia | 5 June 2014 |
| 118 | Fiji | 26 September 2015 |
| 119 | Bangladesh | 6 September 2017 |
| 120 | Saint Kitts and Nevis | 26 June 2019 |
| 121 | Marshall Islands | 24 September 2019 |
| 122 | Equatorial Guinea | 31 July 2020 |
| 123 | Mauritania | 4 August 2020 |
| 124 | Liechtenstein | 2020 |
| 125 | Kenya | 23 September 2021 |
| 126 | China | 26 March 2023 |
| 127 | Kyrgyzstan | 8 April 2025 |
| 128 | Turkmenistan | 12 June 2025 |
| 129 | Moldova | 15 October 2025 |
| 130 | Antigua and Barbuda | 21 June 2026 |
| 131 | Seychelles | 24 September 2026 |
| 132 | El Salvador | Unknown |

== Relations by country ==
=== Africa ===
| Country | Formal Relations Began | Notes |
|---|---|---|
| Sahrawi Arab Democratic Republic | 5 June 2013 | Honduras and Sahrawi Arab Democratic Republic maintained diplomatic relations between 5 June 2013 and April 2026. |

=== Americas ===
| Country | Formal Relations Began | Notes |
|---|---|---|
| Colombia | 19 April 1852 | See Colombia–Honduras relations |
| Mexico | 25 April 1879 | See Honduras–Mexico relations Both countries established diplomatic relations on 25 April 1879 when has been appointed Envoy Extraordinary and Minister Plenipotentiary of Honduras to Mexico Senor Delfino Sanchez.: Honduras has an embassy in Mexico City and consulates-general in San Luis Potosí, Tapachula, Tijuana and Veracruz City and consular agencies in Acayucan, Saltillo and Tenosique.; Mexico has an embassy in Tegucigalpa and a consulate in San Pedro Sula. |
| Nicaragua | | See Honduras–Nicaragua relations Honduras and Nicaragua had tense relations throughout 2000 and early 2001 due to a boundary dispute off the Atlantic coast. Nicaragua imposed a 35% tariff against Honduras due to the dispute, and the matter is currently awaiting a decision from the ICJ.: Honduras has an embassy in Managua.; Nicaragua has an embassy in Tegucigalpa. |
| United States | 19 April 1853 | See Honduras–United States relations Both countries established diplomatic relations on 19 April 1853. In May 1997, former President Carlos Roberto Reina met with former US President Bill Clinton in Costa Rica, and the President of the Dominican Republic to reaffirm support for strengthening democracy, good governance, and promoting prosperity through economic integration, free trade, and investment. The leaders also expressed their commitment to the continued development of just and equitable societies and responsible environmental policies as an integral element of sustainable development. In Summer 2003 Honduras sent around 370 soldiers to Iraq as part of the U.S. coalition of countries that were engaging in war in this country. Immediately after 21 April 2004 these troops were withdrawn by President Ricardo Maduro in the wake of a similar decision by Spanish prime minister José Luis Rodríguez Zapatero. Honduras joining the coalition was largely an attempt to improve foreign relations with the United States over the issue of the migration of many thousands of Hondurans to the US. The money these migrants send back to their families in Honduras is a crucial factor in the Honduran economy, while any political strategy to help these migrants is a guaranteed vote winner.: Honduras has an embassy in Washington, D.C., and consulates-general in Atlanta, Boston, Charlotte, Chicago, Dallas, Houston, Los Angeles, McAllen, Miami, New Orleans, New York City, San Francisco and Seattle.; United States has an embassy in Tegucigalpa. |
| Uruguay | 11 January 1929 | See Honduras–Uruguay relations Both countries established diplomatic relations on 11 January 1929 when has been accredited Minister Resident of Uruguay to Honduras Dr. Luis Saavedra.: Honduras is accredited to Uruguay from its embassy in Buenos Aires, Argentina.; Uruguay is accredited to Honduras from its embassy in Guatemala City, Guatemala. |

=== Asia ===
| Country | Formal Relations Began | Notes |
|---|---|---|
| China | 26 March 2023 | See China–Honduras relations Both countries established diplomatic relations on 26 March 2023. |
| India | 28 September 1994 | See Honduras–India relations Both countries established diplomatic relations on 28 September 1994.: Honduras is accredited to India from its embassy in Kuwait City, Kuwait.; India is accredited to Honduras from its embassy in Guatemala City, Guatemala and maintains an honorary consulate in Tegucigalpa. |
| Israel | 24 April 1955 | Both countries established diplomatic relations on 24 April 1955 when Mr. Joseph Kessary, Envoy Extraordinary and Minister Plenipotentiary of Israel (resident in Mexico) presented his credentials to President of Honduras. In July 2011, President Lobo announced that Honduras would recognise the State of Palestine and support its admission to the General Assembly in September. This broke with the traditional policy of Honduras, which was to encourage a settlement reached through negotiations. After the decision was publicised, Israel withheld its ambassador to Honduras and made a formal protest with the Honduran embassy in Tel Aviv. In response, Lobo defended his intention "from a moral point of view". Palestinian Foreign Minister Riyad al-Maliki claimed that official recognition would be announced by the Honduran Foreign Ministry on 20 August following the summit of the Central American Integration System (SICA) on 18 August. According to Lobo, the organisation was expected to adopt a co-ordinated position on the issue, but El Salvador, the nation presiding over the summit, refused to include the matter on the official agenda, insisting that discussion should retain a regional focus. Despite this, Honduras and El Salvador both officially recognised the Palestinian state on 26 August. In December 2017, Honduras was one of nine countries (including the United States and Israel) to support Israel and vote against a motion adopted by the United Nations General Assembly condemning the United States' recognition of Jerusalem as the capital of Israel. In February 2021, the first COVID vaccines in the country were received through a donation from Israel. In June 2021, Honduras moved its embassy from Tel Aviv to Jerusalem, being the fourth country to move its embassy to Jerusalem. (The other countries are the United States, Guatemala, and Kosovo.) |
| Turkey | 4 April 1950 | Both countries established diplomatic relations on 4 April 1950.: Turkey is accredited to Honduras from its embassy in Guatemala City, Guatemala.; Trade volume between the two countries was US$19.8 million in 2019 (Honduran exports/imports: 4.8/15million USD). |

=== Europe ===
| Country | Formal Relations Began | Notes |
|---|---|---|
| Czech Republic | 12 March 1930 | Honduras and Czechoslovakia established diplomatic relations on 12 March 1930, Honduras and Czech Republic established diplomatic relations on 12 January 1993. |
| Germany | 15 April 1876 | See Germany-Honduras relations Both countries established diplomatic relations on 15 April 1876 when has been appointed first Consul General and Chargé d'Affaires of Germany to Honduras and other countries of Central America Lugwig Friedrich Werner von Bergen. Diplomatic relations between Honduras and Federal Republic of Germany were established on 20 January 1960.: Germany has an embassy in Tegucigalpa.; Honduras has an embassy in Berlin. |
| Italy | 25 February 1864 | See Honduras–Italy relations Both countries established diplomatic relations on 25 February 1864.: Honduras has an embassy in Rome.; Italy is accredited to Honduras from its embassy in Guatemala City, Guatemala. |
| Kosovo | 3 September 2010 | Honduras officially recognized the Republic of Kosovo on 3 September 2010. Kosovo and Honduras established diplomatic relations on 2 December 2010. |
| Russia | 30 September 1990 | See Honduras–Russia relations Diplomatic relations between the USSR and Honduras established on 30 September 1990.: Honduras has an embassy in Moscow.; Russia is accredited to Honduras from its embassy in Managua, Nicaragua. |
| Spain | 17 November 1894 | See Honduras–Spain relations Both countries established diplomatic relations on 17 November 1894.: Honduras has an embassy in Madrid and consulates-general in Barcelona, Bilbao and Valencia and a vice consulate in Girona.; Spain has an embassy in Tegucigalpa. |
| United Kingdom | 16 June 1849 | See Honduras–United Kingdom relations Honduras established diplomatic relations with the United Kingdom on 16 June 1849.: Honduras maintains an embassy in London.; United Kingdom is accredited to Honduras through its embassy in Guatemala City.; The UK governed the Mosquito Coast from 1638 to 1787 and 1816 to 1819. Both countries share common membership of the International Criminal Court, the World Trade Organization, as well as the Central America–UK Association Agreement. |

== See also ==
- List of diplomatic missions in Honduras
- List of diplomatic missions of Honduras
