= Honduras–Uruguay relations =

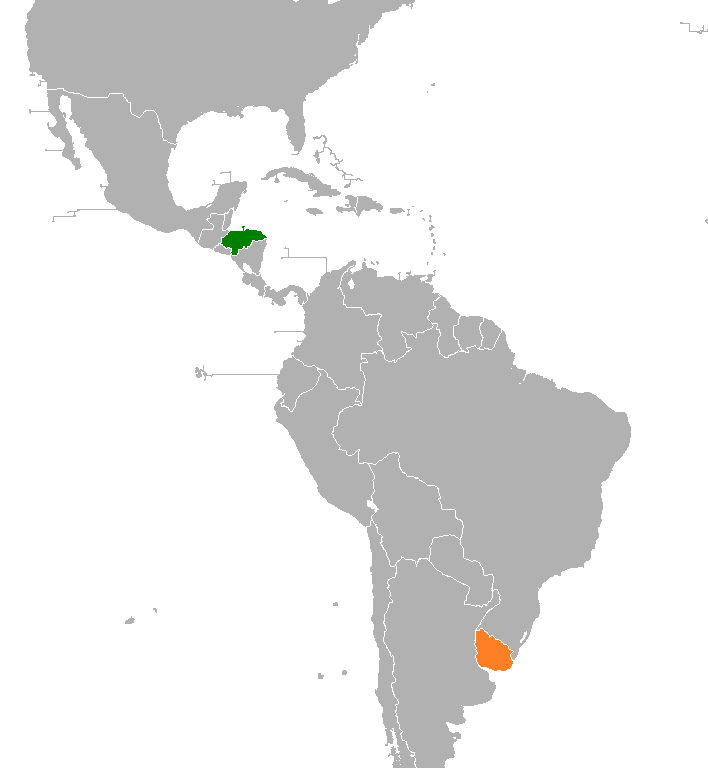

- Honduras: Uruguay

The Republic of Honduras and the Oriental Republic of Uruguay have long-standing bilateral and historical relations. Both nations are members of the Community of Latin American and Caribbean States, Group of 77, Organization of American States, Organization of Ibero-American States and the United Nations.

== History ==
Both Honduras and Uruguay share a common history in the fact that both nations were once part of the Spanish Empire. During the Spanish colonial period, Honduras was governed from the Viceroyalty of New Spain in Mexico City while Uruguay was then part of the Viceroyalty of the Río de la Plata and administered from Buenos Aires. In 1828, Uruguay obtained its independence after the Cisplatine War. In 1841, Honduras obtained its independence after the dissolution of the Federal Republic of Central America. On 11 January 1929 both nations established diplomatic relations.

Bilateral relations between both nations have taken place primarily in multilateral forums. In November 2006, Honduran President Manuel Zelaya attended the 16th Ibero-American Summit in Montevideo. In June 2009, President Zelaya was removed from power in a coup d'état. As a result, the Uruguayan government condemned the coup and lowered diplomatic relations with the interim Honduran government led by acting President Roberto Micheletti. In June 2011, Uruguay re-established full diplomatic relations with the Honduran government with the return of Zelaya back to Honduras from exile in the Dominican Republic.

In July 2013, Honduran President Porfirio Lobo Sosa paid a visit to Uruguay and met with President José Mujica.

== Bilateral agreements ==
Both nations have signed a few agreements such as a Reciprocity Agreement for the Elimination of Visas in Diplomatic, Official, Special and Ordinary Passports (1982); Cultural Agreement (1988); Agreement of Academic Cooperation between both nations respective Ministry's of Foreign Affairs (2013); Agreement for Economic, Scientific and Technical Cooperation (2013); and a Memorandum of Understanding for the Establishment of a Political Consultation Mechanism (2013).

== Diplomatic missions ==
- Honduras is accredited to Uruguay from its embassy in Buenos Aires, Argentina.
- Uruguay is accredited to Honduras from its embassy in Guatemala City, Guatemala.

== See also ==
- Foreign relations of Honduras
- Foreign relations of Uruguay
