= List of diplomatic missions in Honduras =

This is a list of diplomatic missions in Honduras, a republic located in Central America. The capital, Tegucigalpa, hosts 26 embassies.

However, the Ministry of Foreign Affairs of Honduras does not provide a listing of consulates general or honorary consulates located in the country, nor does it specify which countries accredit ambassadors from other countries.

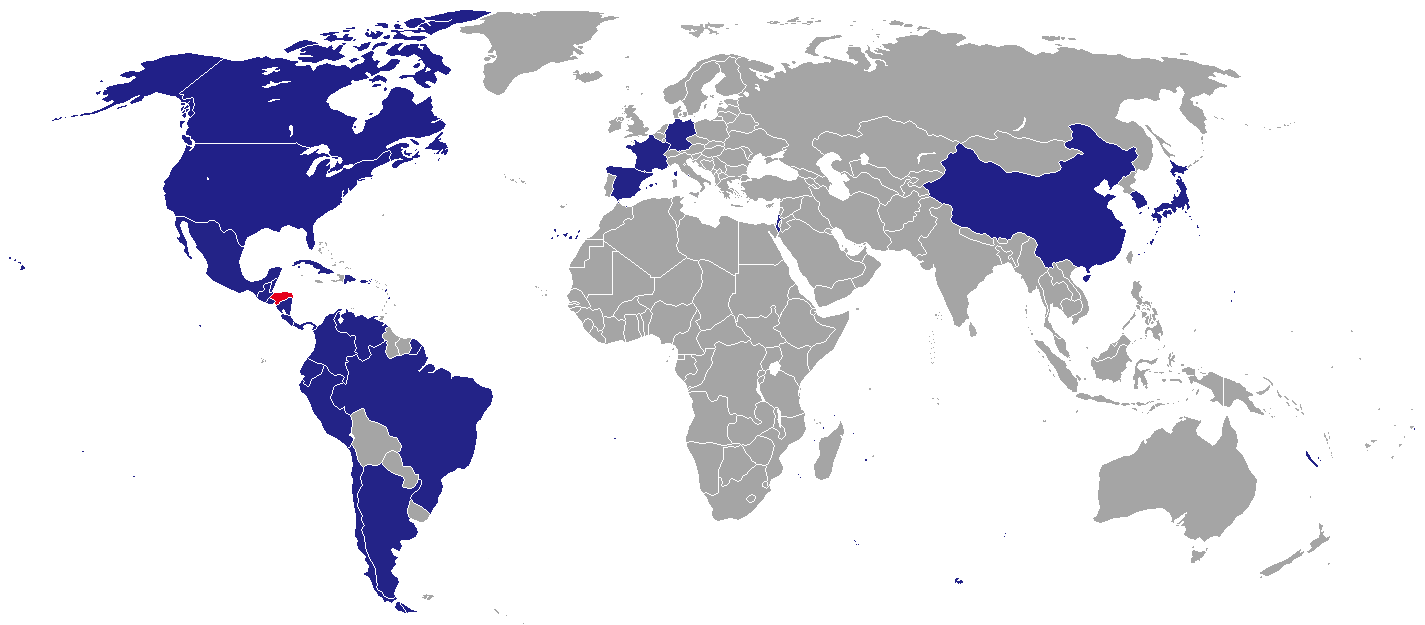
Map of diplomatic missions in Honduras

== Diplomatic missions in Tegucigalpa ==
=== Embassies ===
1. Argentina
2. Belize
3. Brazil
4. China
5. Chile
6. Colombia
7. Costa Rica
8. Cuba
9. Dominican Republic
10. Ecuador
11. El Salvador
12. France
13. Germany
14. Guatemala
15. Holy See
16. Israel
17. Japan
18. Mexico
19. Nicaragua
20. Panama
21. Peru
22. South Korea
23. Sovereign Military Order of Malta
24. Spain
25. United States
26. Venezuela

=== Other missions or delegations ===
1. Canada (Embassy office)
2. Switzerland (Cooperation office & consular agency)

=== Gallery ===
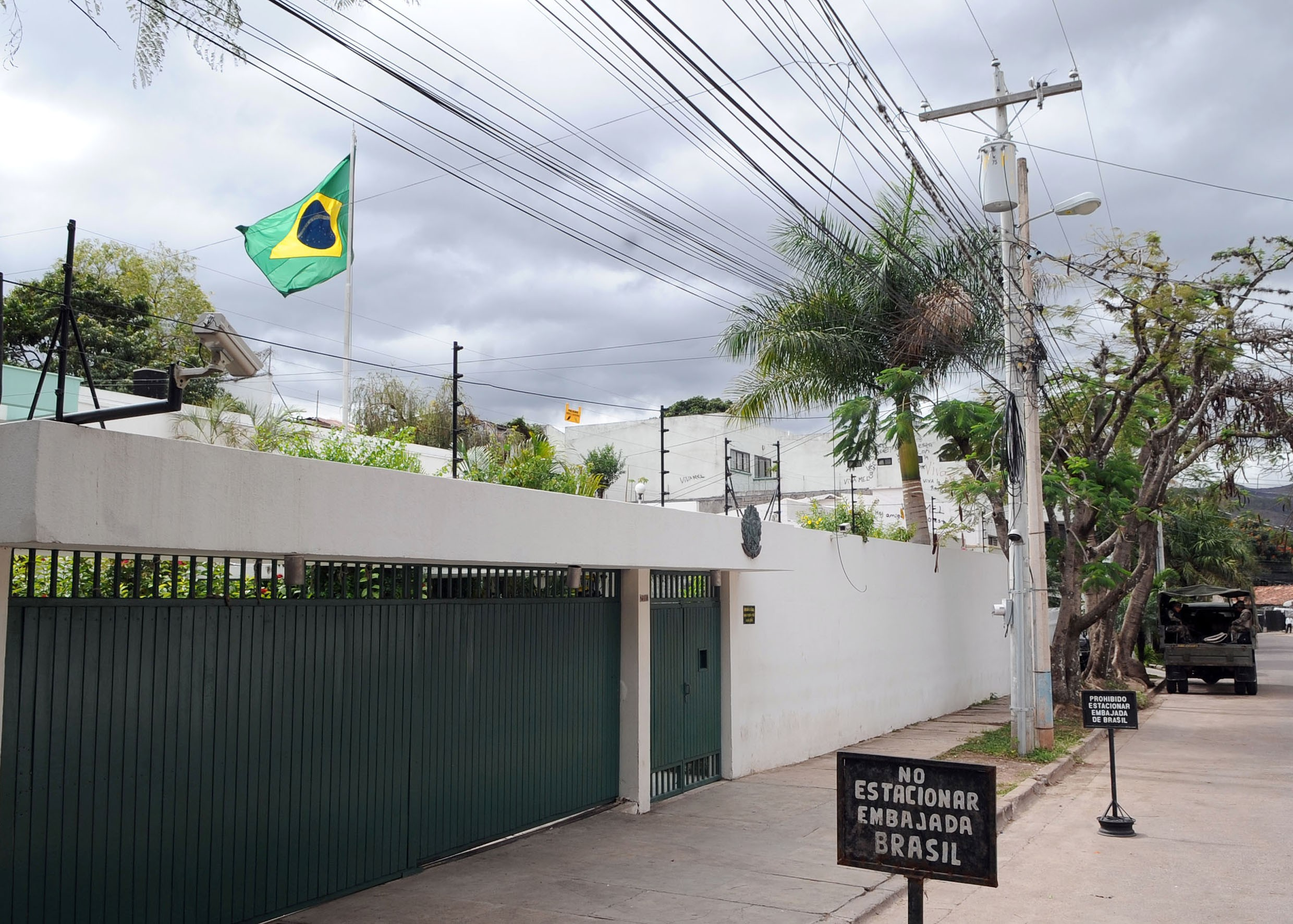
Embassy of Brazil

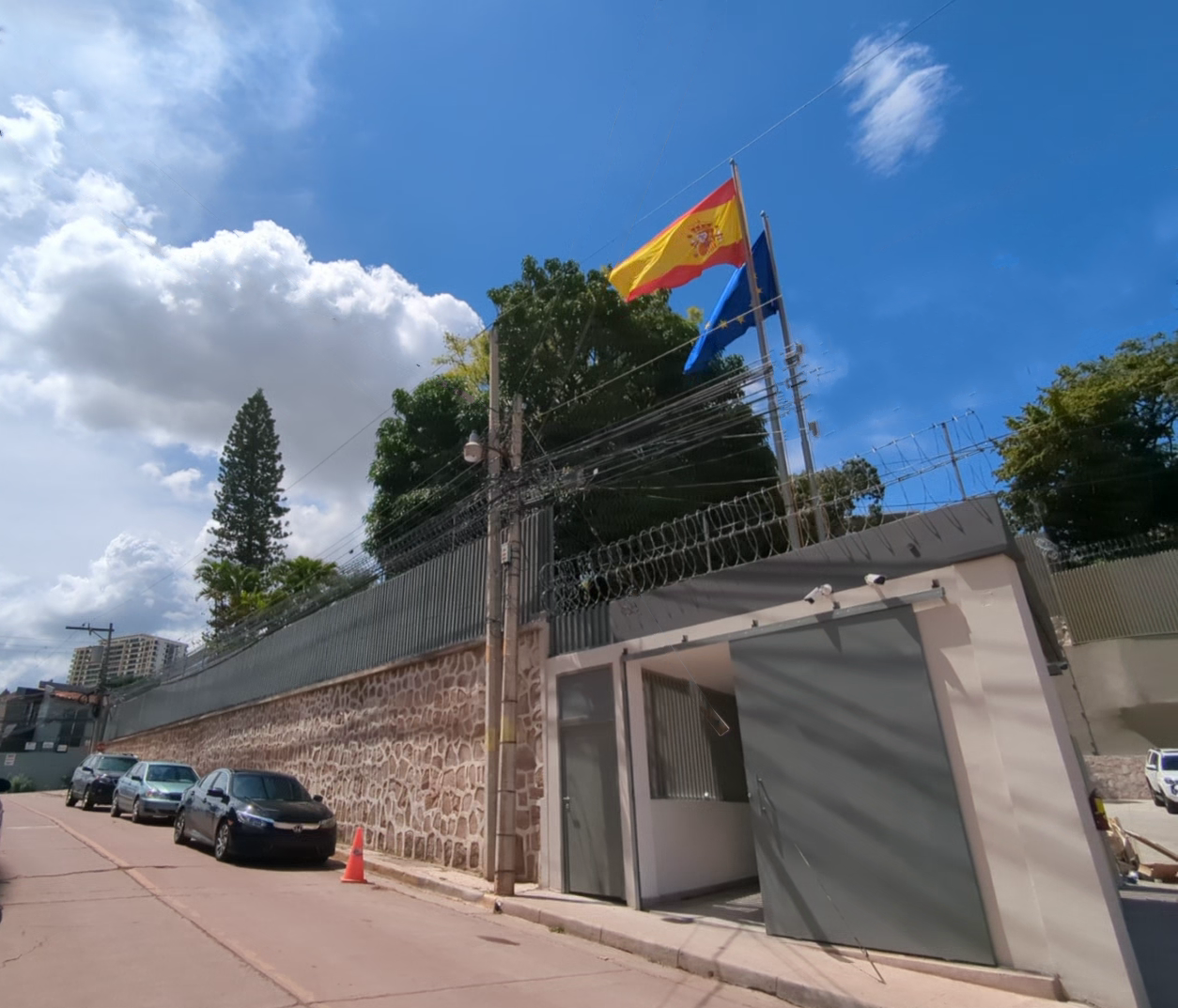
Embabassy of Spain

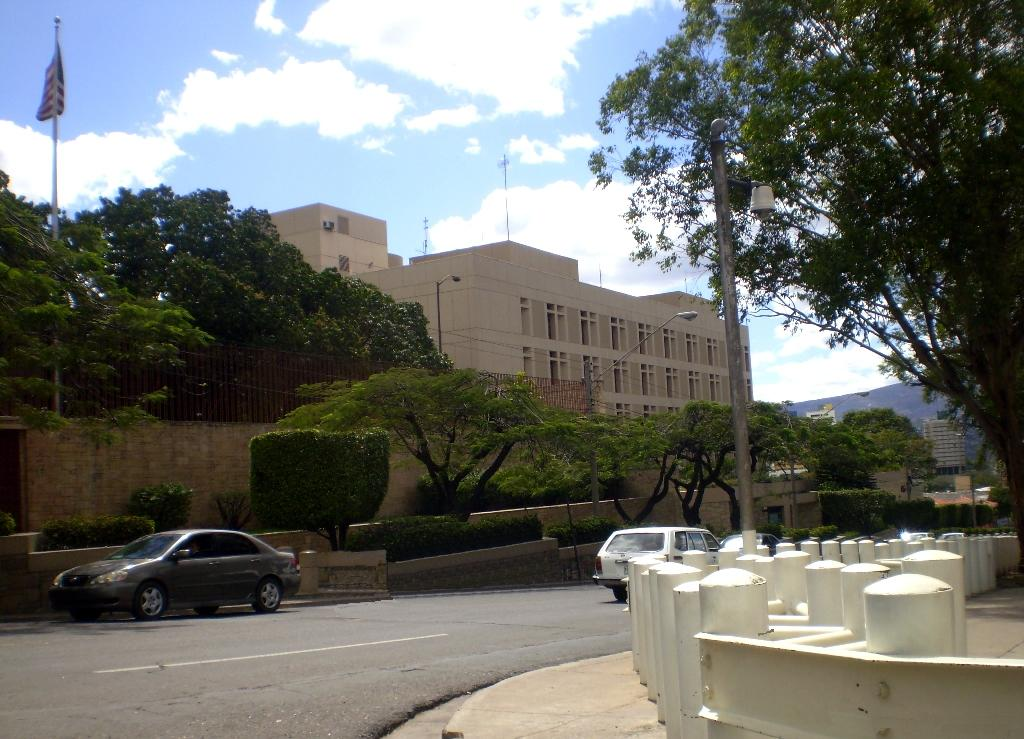
Embassy of the United States

== Consular missions ==
=== In Choluteca ===
- El Salvador

=== In San Pedro Sula ===
- Dominican Republic (Consulate-General)
- El Salvador (Consulate-General)
- Guatemala (Consulate-General)
- Mexico (Consulate)
- United States (Consular Agency)

== Non-resident embassies accredited to Honduras ==
Resident in Havana, Cuba:

- Angola
- Cambodia
- Dominica
- Guinea
- Laos
- Mali
- Syria
- Senegal
- Tanzania
- Timor-Leste
- Zimbabwe

Resident in Guatemala City, Guatemala:

- Canada
- Egypt
- India
- Italy
- Morocco
- Sweden
- Turkey
- United Kingdom
- Uruguay

Resident in Managua, Nicaragua

- Iran
- Palestine
- Russia

Resident in Mexico City, Mexico:

- Algeria
- Australia
- Austria
- Bangladesh
- Belgium
- Finland
- Greece
- Iraq
- Ireland
- Ivory Coast
- Jordan
- Kuwait
- Libya
- Lebanon
- Malaysia
- Nigeria
- Norway
- New Zealand
- Portugal
- Philippines
- Pakistan
- Poland
- Serbia
- Saudi Arabia
- Thailand
- Vietnam

Resident in New York City, United States of America (Note: Accredited missions are the sending countries' permanent missions to the United Nations)

- Andorra
- Bosnia and Herzegovina
- Croatia
- Central African Republic
- Fiji
- Guinea-Bissau
- Kyrgyzstan
- Maldives
- Marshall Islands
- Nauru
- Sierra Leone
- Sudan
- Somalia
- South Sudan
- Tonga

Resident in Panama City, Panama:

- Barbados
- Indonesia
- Kosovo
- Paraguay
- United Arab Emirates

Resident in Washington, D.C., United States of America:

- Afghanistan
- Bahrain
- Gabon
- Ghana
- Kenya
- Singapore
- Togo
- Turkmenistan
- Tunisia
- Yemen
- Zambia

Resident in other cities:

- Bolivia (San José)
- Iceland (Ottawa)
- Qatar (San Salvador)

== Former missions ==
Tegucigalpa:

- Republic of China (Taiwan) (Embassy)

San Pedro Sula:

- Republic of China (Taiwan) (Consulates General)

== See also ==
- Foreign relations of Honduras
