= Honduras–Russia relations =

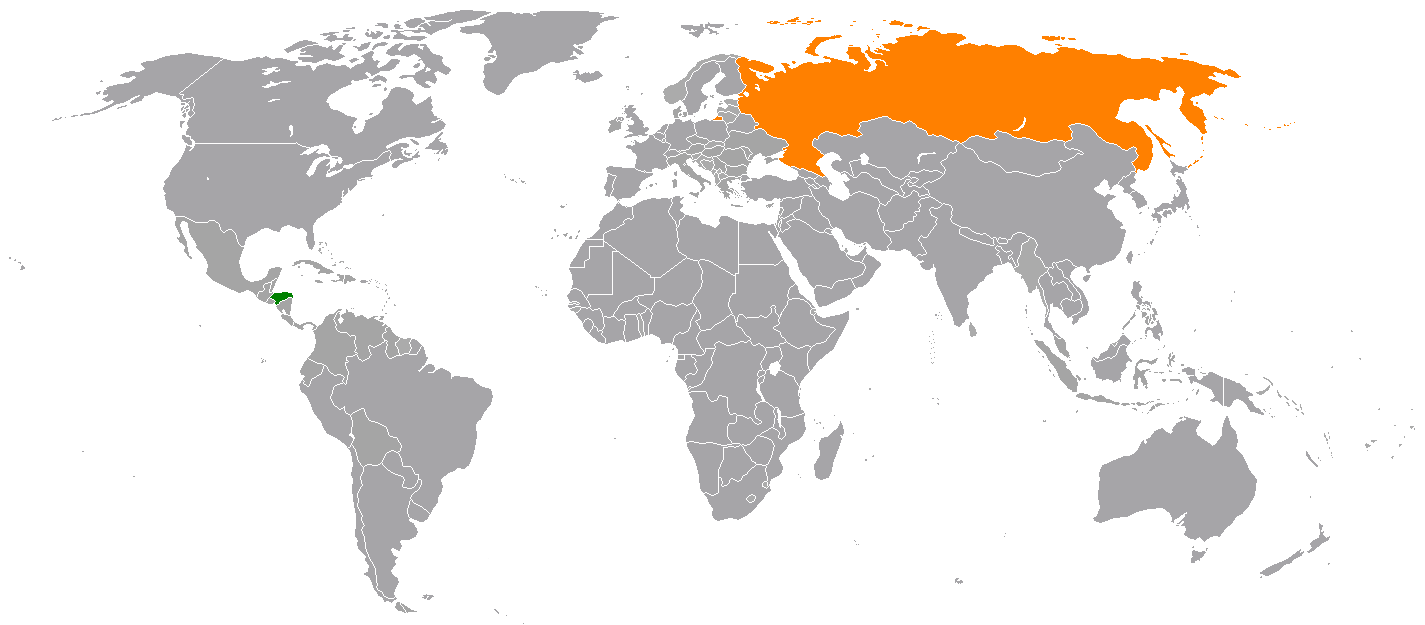

- Honduras: Russia

Honduras and Russia signed diplomatic relations on September 30, 1990. Honduras is represented in Russia through its embassy in Moscow. Russia is represented in Honduras through its embassy in Managua (Nicaragua) and two honorary consulates (in San Pedro Sula and Tegucigalpa).

Both countries are full members of the International Monetary Fund and the United Nations.

== Bilateral relations ==
Diplomatic relations between the USSR and Honduras started on September 30, 1990. After the dissolution of the Soviet Union, Honduras recognized Russia as the USSR's successor on January 3, 1992. In 1993 in both countries ambassadors accredited in combination - Ambassador of the Russian Federation, Ambassador of Nicaragua, and of Honduras in Russia. In 1995, the Honorary Consul of Russia was built in Honduras. It supports inter-parliamentary ties. In 1988 and 1991 in Moscow, the delegation visited the National Congress of Honduras. In 1989 he traveled to Honduras. In late September 1996 a visit to the country the delegation of the Federation Council of Federal Assembly of Russian Federation headed by Moscow Gordumy VM Platonov. To date, the Russian-Honduran context, has achieved some progress. It is a political dialogue on pressing international issues, Central American contacts at the United Nations. After the 2009 Honduran coup d'etat, a spokesman for the Russian Foreign Ministry condemned Zelaya's overthrow and called it a "gross violation of basic democratic norms." Russia also welcomed the efforts by regional organizations and groups trying "to work out a solution within the framework of international law."

== See also ==
- Foreign relations of Honduras
- Foreign relations of Russia
