= Honduras–Nicaragua border =

International border

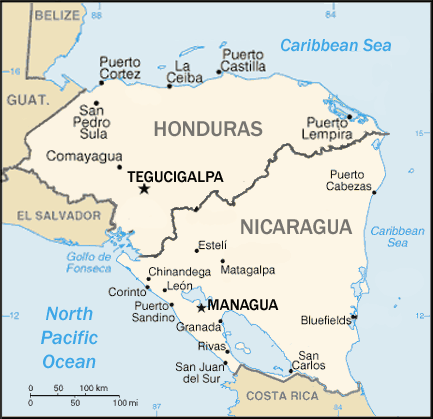
Honduras-Nicaragua border

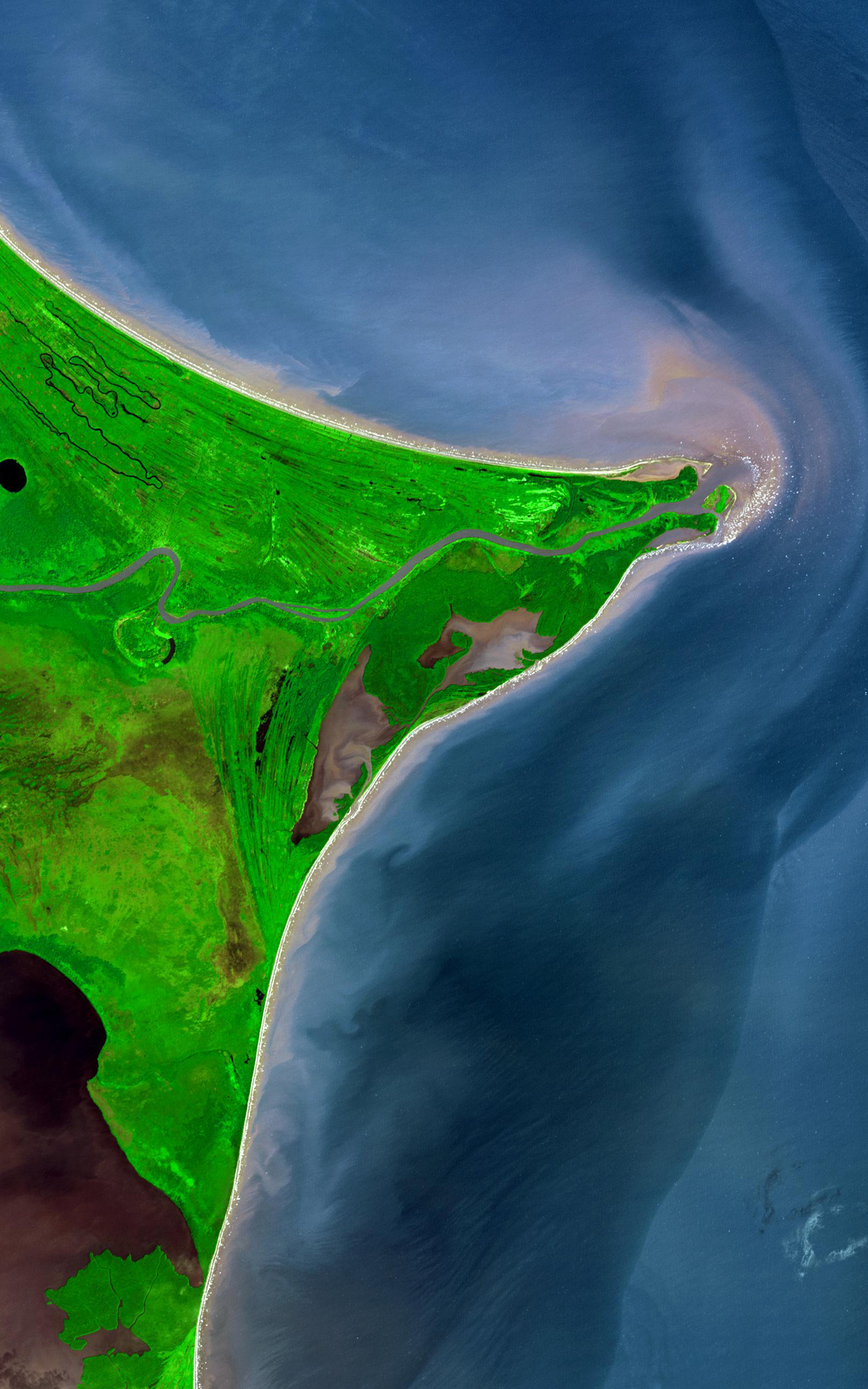
The Coco River forms the eastern part of the border

The Honduras–Nicaragua border is the roughly 950-kilometre-long (590 mi) international boundary between Honduras and Nicaragua, running from the Gulf of Fonseca on the Pacific Ocean to the Caribbean Sea. The Coco River, which flows generally northeast to the Caribbean, forms more than half of the border.

The border passes between the following departments, from west to east:

- Honduras – Choluteca, Colón, Olancho, Gracias a Dios.
- Nicaragua – Chinandega, Madriz, Nueva Segovia, Jinotega and North Caribbean Coast Autonomous Region.

Honduras and Nicaragua, respectively, were part of the Central American Federation and the United Provinces of Central America. Between 1823 and 1838, these federations fell apart and both nations gained their independence and defined their border.

In 1937, the issuance of a stamp from Nicaragua with a sticker on part of Honduran territory indicating "territory in dispute" almost caused a war between the two countries. The territory had been claimed by Nicaragua, but Honduras thought the matter closed in 1906 when an arbitration by King Alfonso XIII of Spain gave it the area.

== Location ==
Point	Coordinates (links to map & photo sources)	Notes
Gulf of Fonseca	12.98621°N 87.30311°W	Elevation: 0 ft
Guasaule	13.06213°N 86.95421°W	Elev: 130 ft
El Espino	13.44635°N 86.72222°W	Elev: 2958 ft
Trojes	14.07392°N 86.00496°W	Elev: 2305 ft
Coco River joins border	13.8328°N 85.75278°W	Elev: 856 ft
Santa Isabel	14.78926°N 84.78206°W	Elev: 244 ft
Waspam	14.7458°N 83.9722°W	Elev: 83 ft
Cabo Gracias a Dios	15.00°N 83.1334°W	Elev: 0 ft

== See also ==
- Honduras–Nicaragua relations
- South Cay
- Spanish conquest of Nicaragua
- Spanish conquest of Honduras
