= Honduras–Italy relations =

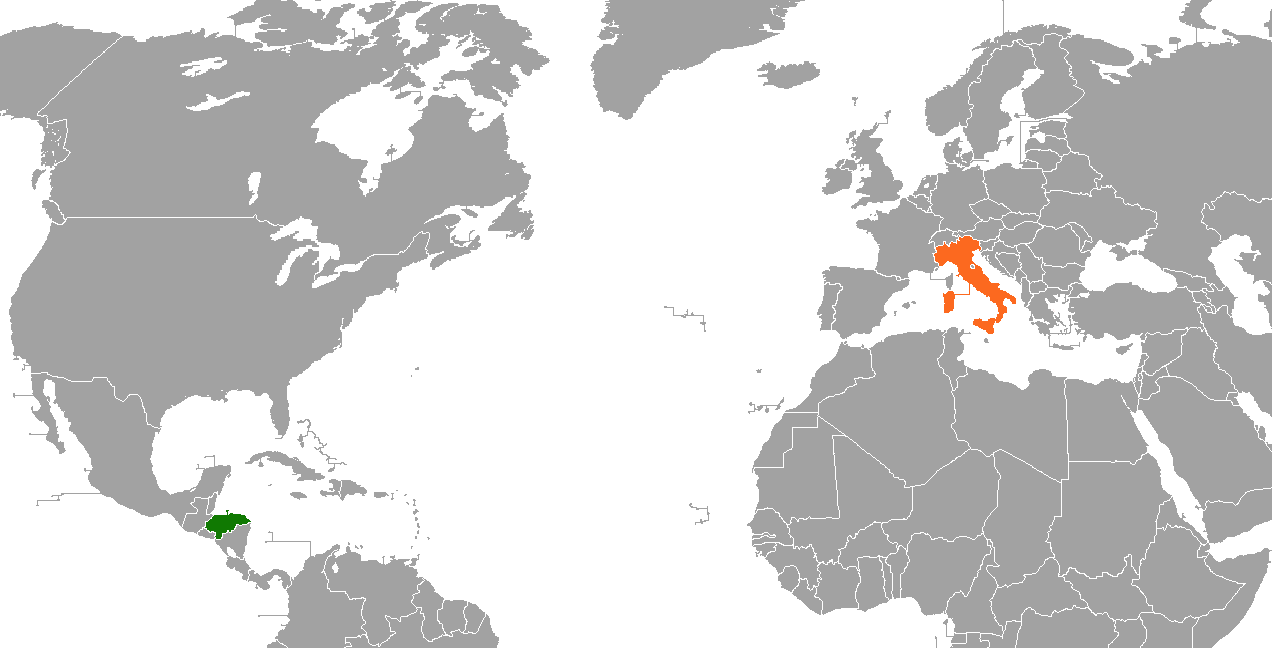

- Honduras: Italy

Honduras and Italy maintain bilateral relations. Honduras has an embassy in Rome, while Italy has a non-resident ambassador based in Guatemala City accredited to Honduras.

== Political and diplomatic relations ==
The embassy of Honduras in Italy is located in Rome, whereas the Italian Embassy in Tegucigalpa closed in December 2014. The functions of Italian Ambassador in Honduras fall upon the Italian Ambassador in Guatemala.

Italy and Honduras are part of the Italo-Latin America Conference and of the Italo-Latin American Institute. The institute is the executor of numerous development projects, supported and funded by the Italian Ministry of Foreign Affairs and by the European Union. The sectors financed for development are: security and justice, social policies, institutional strengthening, technical-scientific training, support for small and medium-sized enterprises and cooperatives in particular for women, sustainable agricultural development projects, enhancement and protection of cultural heritage, humanitarian demining.

Two minor agreements were signed in October 2006 between the countries: one for the financing of 15 million euros for the furnishing of the "Maria" pediatric hospital while the second provided for bilateral cooperation for the fight against organized crime.

On 29 August 2012, the Joint Declaration G-16 was signed. Through this document, the Italian Government is committed to the ongoing political process and upcoming elections, public safety, respect for human rights, economic and social growth, fiscal policy, public spending and transparency in the public administration.

On 24 May 2021, a meeting took place at the Farnesina Palace between Deputy Minister Marina Sereni and the Minister of Foreign Affairs of Honduras Lisandro Rosales Banegas. The main topics of this meeting were the fight against climate change, paying attention to the damage caused by hurricanes Eta and Iota, and the fight against COVID-19, highlighting the fact that Italy has joined the international mechanisms for access to the vaccine, through the announcement of 300 million euros for the Covax Facility by President Draghi during the Global Health Summit.

== Economic relations ==
There are several large Italian companies in Honduras, the main ones being ACEA, ASTALDI and COLACEM. The latter operates in Honduras through the Eurocantera and Goldlake.

In June 2012, the EU-Central America Association Agreement was signed in Tegucigalpa, during the summit between the Heads of State of the SICA member countries. The agreement provides for the strengthening of trade relations between Europe and Honduras and allows Italy to facilitate the import of its products from the agri-food and high-tech sectors.

== See also ==
- Foreign relations of Honduras
- Foreign relations of Italy
