= Honduras–Nicaragua relations =

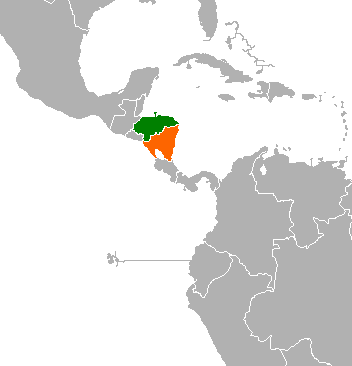

- Honduras: Nicaragua

Honduras and Nicaragua have long-standing bilateral and historical relations, owing to a shared history in the Spanish Empire. Honduras has an embassy in Managua and Nicaragua has an embassy in Tegucigalpa. Both countries are members of the Central American Integration System, Community of Latin American and Caribbean States, and the Organization of Ibero-American States.

== See also ==
- Honduras–Nicaragua border
- Foreign relations of Honduras
- Foreign relations of Nicaragua
