= Honduras–India relations =

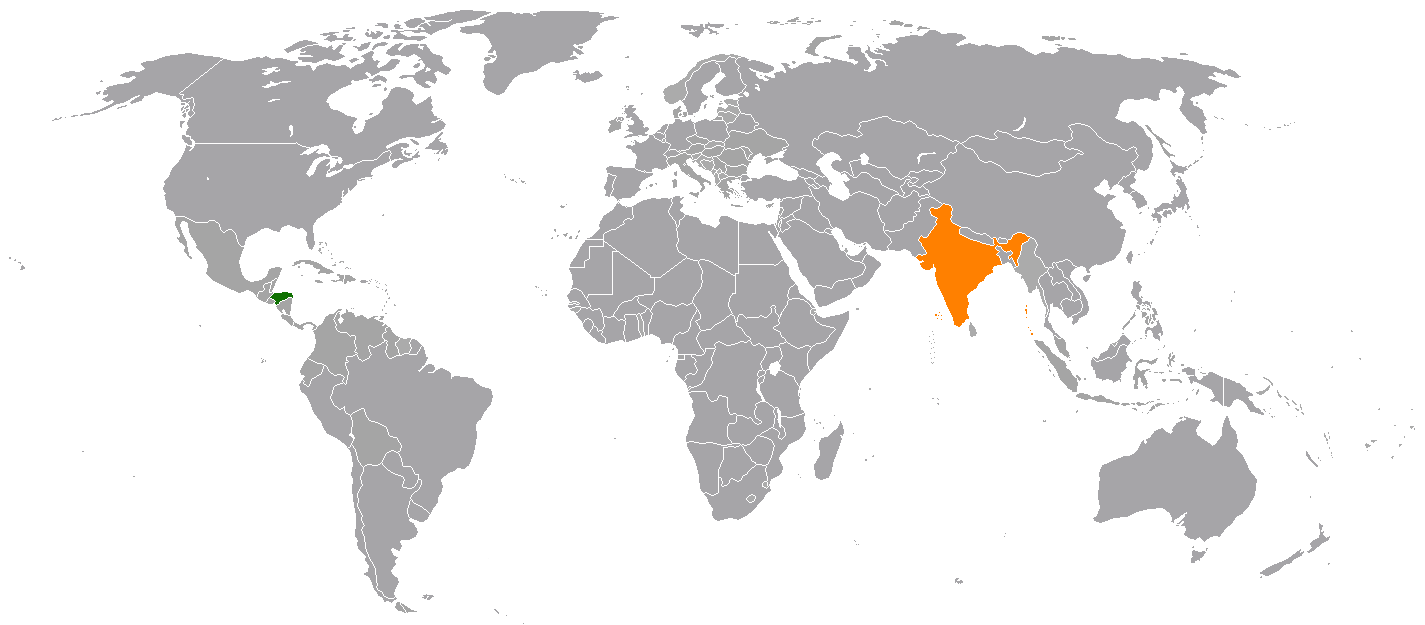

- Honduras: India

Bilateral relations between Honduras and India have included trade, cultural exchange, and economic and educational projects undertaken together. The Ambassador of India in Guatemala City is concurrently accredited to Honduras. India also maintains an Honorary Consul General in Tegucigalpa. Honduras has resident embassy in New Delhi since 2025.

== High level visits ==
Honduran Defence Minister Aristides Mejia Carranza visited India in April 2008 and held meetings with Exim Bank officials and Indian companies executing projects in Honduras. Vice Foreign Minister Eduardo Enrique Garcia Reina visited the country in June 2008 to participate in the second India-SICA Foreign Ministers' meeting in New Delhi. During the meeting, Honduras and India signed an MoU, agreeing to hold regular Foreign Office Consultations. The first such Consultation was held in Honduras on 27 April 2015. Special Secretary (AMS & CPV) in the Ministry of External Affairs R. Swaminathan led the Indian delegation at the Consultation.

In March 2011, the Honduran Government announced that it would close its embassies in five South American countries and utilize the resources to open trade offices in India, Singapore, China, and Canada. Honduran Agriculture Minister Jacobo Regalado visited India in January 2013, and Vice Defence Minister Carlos Roberto Fune attended Aero India 2013 in Bangalore in February. Minister of Economic Development Alten Rivera Montes visited India in October 2014 to attend the VI India-LAC Investment Conclave.

== Trade ==
Bilateral trade between Honduras and India totaled US$170.96 million in 2015–2016, declining by 19.68% from the previous fiscal. India exported $155.05 million worth of goods to Honduras, and imported $15.91 million. The main commodities exported by India to Honduras are tanning and dyeing extracts, rubber products, iron and steel, pharmaceuticals, and cotton. The major commodities imported by India from Honduras are iron, steel, and aluminium articles.

An Indo-Canadian joint venture company opened a silk yarn knitting factory in San Pedro Sula in 2006. There have been several visits by trade, business, tourism, and other delegations between the two countries.

== Cultural relations ==
A Bharatanatyam dance troupe led by Ananda Shankar Jayant performed in Honduras in September 2004. This was the first ever performance by an Indian troupe in the country. Yoga is popular in Honduras, and there are several yoga schools in the country. India's independence was officially celebrated in Honduras on 14 August 2007. The ceremony was attended by President Zelaya, Cabinet Ministers, several other senior officials and the Indian High Commissioner to Honduras (resident in Guatemala City).

As of December 2016, around 12 Indians reside in Honduras, most of whom are nuns in Christian missionaries.

== Foreign aid ==
India donated ₹3.38 lakh (equivalent to ₹11 lakh or US$14,000 in 2023) worth of medicines and medical supplies in 1998, and $10,000 worth of medicines in the aftermath of a severe drought in Honduras in October 2005. The following month, India donated 26 Bajaj three-wheelers.

The Honduran Government signed an agreement with the Exim Bank of India in August 2006 to avail a line of credit of $30 million. Honduras and India signed an MoU in January 2008 to establish an IT Center in Tegucigalpa with Indian assistance. The centre was operated by NIIT between 2008 and 2011, during which time over 20,000 students were trained. In 2011, NIIT transferred the centre to the Honduran National Autonomous University in Tegucigalpa. In 2016, India provided grant-in-aid of $84,000 to the Honduran National Autonomous University to procure new equipment for the centre.

India extended a line of credit of $30 million to Honduras in 2006. The Honduran Government utilized the funds to procure transport, communication and medical equipment. India agreed to provide a line of credit of $26.5 million in 2014 for the Jamastran River Valley Irrigation Project. The formal agreement was signed in August 2016. The project work was carried out by Indian firm, Apollo International.

Citizens of Honduras are eligible for scholarships under the Indian Technical and Economic Cooperation Programme. Illiterate Honduran women from the remote and rural areas of Los Hornos, Los Naranjos, and La Mosquitia attended a six-month solar rural electrification course, sponsored by the Indian Government, at the Barefoot College in Tilonia, Rajasthan in 2014. After completing the course, the women returned to Honduras and installed 207 solar panels in their villages. The panels generate 85 watts each and provide solar energy to 3,778 households, benefiting 22,739 people in 52 districts.

== See also ==
- Foreign relations of Honduras
- Foreign relations of India
