= Italy–Latin America Conference =

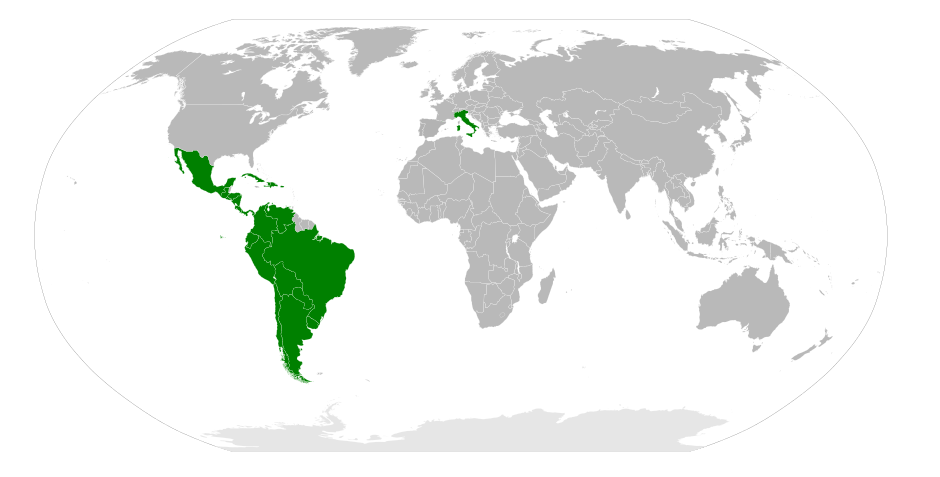
- Headquarters: Rome
- Membership: Host Nation: Italy; List: Argentina; Bolivia; Brazil; Chile; Colombia; Costa Rica; Cuba; Dominican Republic; Ecuador; El Salvador; Guatemala; Haiti; Honduras; Mexico; Nicaragua; Panama; Paraguay; Peru; Uruguay; Venezuela
- Website; Italy-Latin America Conference

The Italy–Latin America Conference or Italo–Latin America Conference, formally the Italy–Latin America and Caribbean Conference, is an inter-governmental forum for encounter between Italy and the countries of Latin America. A biennial summit is organised in Italy by the "Italo-Latin American Institute" located in Rome, with many initiatives marking the "preparatory path". The institute's aims are to develop and coordinate research and documentation regarding the problems, achievements and prospects of its Member Countries in cultural, scientific, economic, technical and social contexts. The conferences are an effective and well-established policy instrument in Italy's relations with the countries of Latin America and the Caribbean.

Italy and the countries of Latin America share a common culture as part of the Romance-speaking and Roman Catholic world. Italians have been in Central and South America since the Age of Discovery as explorers, navigators, missionaries, artists and merchants; from the 19th century, the Italian diaspora brought a multitude of Italians to the Americas. Therefore, Latin America has a large number of people of Italian origin living in Bolivia, Brazil, Chile, Colombia, Costa Rica, Cuba, Dominican Republic, Ecuador, Guatemala, Honduras, Mexico, Panama, Paraguay, Peru, Costa Rica, El Salvador, Uruguay, and Venezuela. The Italian linguistic, cultural, juridical, architectural, and musical traditions have become an integral part of the national identity of many Latin American countries. Two nations, Colombia and Venezuela, are named after the Italian explorer Christopher Columbus and the Italian city Venice respectively; the very concept of "Latin America" (coined in the 19th century to describe the territories of the Americas where Spanish and Portuguese were spoken) is indirectly named after the Italian region of Latium, in which the Italic language of Latin originated, and the Italian explorer Amerigo Vespucci. Economic and industrial ties are significant and include trade as well as the presence and investments of Italian companies in Latin America and of Latin American companies in Italy. There is also a strong collaboration between Italian institutions and the nations of Central and South America in combating drug trafficking and organized crime, due to links between the Italian mafias and criminal organizations (such as drug cartels) in the Americas. Italy and most Latin American countries are part of the Latin Union. Italy and some Latin American countries (Mexico, Brazil, Argentina) are part of the G8+5 and of the G20. As a founding and leading state of the European Union, Italy has historically played a particularly active role in strengthening the partnership between the regional organisations of Latin America and Europe.

== See also ==
- Organization of Ibero-American States
- Latin Union
