= Paul Vinelli =

American economist

- Paul Vinelli in 1993
- Born: November 7, 1922; Naples, Italy
- Died: February 18, 1997 (aged 74); Houston, Texas, U.S.
- Education: A.B, M.A
- Alma mater: University of Michigan
- Occupations: Banker, Economist

Paul Vinelli (November 7, 1922 – February 18, 1997) was an Italian-American-Honduran economist and banker. He was sent to Honduras in 1949 by the International Monetary Fund (IMF) to advise the government on banking and tax legislation. He was instrumental in the creation of the Central Bank of Honduras and the National Bank for Agricultural Development in 1950. He remained working as an economic advisor to the Honduran government for six years. In future years he continued to be one of the strongest guides of Honduran economic policy.

In 1957 he joined Banco Atlántida, then one of the largest banks in Honduras, which during the 1960s and 1970s was a correspondent bank of Chase Manhattan Bank. He was chief executive officer from 1978 to 1995, and chairman of the board from 1978 until his death in 1997. He helped establish the School of Economics at the Universidad Nacional Autónoma de Honduras where he taught for twenty-five years. In 1996 he was named Honduran Ambassador to the Food and Agriculture Organization of the United Nations (FAO).

Vinelli was also noted for his role in the development of financial services and industry in Honduras. He helped create and was president of many companies, in the areas of paper, hotels, real estate, insurance, and others. He was a founder of Atlantic Bank Limited Belize. He was decorated by the governments of Chile, Honduras, Italy, Panama and the United States. In 1980, he was kidnapped by the Farabundo Martí National Liberation Front (FMLN) and held for 75 days.

== Early life and education ==
Vinelli was born Paolo Vinella in Naples, Italy, the third and youngest child of Angelo Vinella and Addolorata Casavola. When he was five, the family moved to Salerno, Italy. They immigrated to the United States in 1935, establishing a grocery business in Portland, Maine.

Vinelli attended 8th grade at The North School and then went on to Portland High School. While there, he changed his name to Paul Vinelli. He then attended University of Michigan from 1940 to 1944, graduating with an A.B. in Romance languages and an M.A. in economics.

== Career ==
After completing his studies in Michigan, in 1944 Vinelli was hired by the Federal Reserve Board of Governors in Washington, D.C. He was an economist in the Division of Research and Statistics, International Section. He wrote several papers while there, including New Taxation Trends in Latin America.

In 1946, he served six months in the U.S. Army. He was released from service as World War II wound down and the need for soldiers was greatly reduced. From 1946 to 1948, he worked as a Trust Investment Advisor and later a Security Analyst at American Security & Trust Company in Washington, D.C.

Vinelli joined the International Monetary Fund (IMF) as an economist in 1948. In 1949, Honduran president Juan Manuel Gálvez asked the IMF to assist his government with writing new banking and tax legislation and the parameters for establishing a Central Bank and a National Bank for Agricultural Development. The purpose of these banks was to regulate the exchange policy, monetary policy and credit policy of Honduras. Vinelli was the lead economist on that mission and worked with members of the Honduran Ministry of Finance in drafting the legislation.

The National Congress of Honduras approved the legislation in February 1950, and soon afterwards the IMF moved Vinelli and his family to Tegucigalpa, Honduras. Vinelli worked with a Honduran commission appointed by Gálvez, an advisor from the International Bank for Reconstruction and Development, and bankers from Guatemala and El Salvador. The team, led by Vinelli, created the two banks in three months; they opened for business in July 1950. Inaugurating a Central Bank was a major step in the monetary area for Honduras: until 1950, lempiras and dollars were interchangeable as currency, and lempiras were issued by two private banks. After July 1, 1950, The Central Bank became the only issuer of the lempira. This monetary sovereignty resulted in the government of Honduras having what economists call seigniorage, the profits from which allowed the Central Bank later to finance operations of the Honduran government.

Vinelli and his team also created the framework to establish the School of Economics of the Universidad Nacional Autónoma de Honduras, where Vinelli taught from its inauguration and for twenty-five years thereafter. He taught many of the most prominent financial minds in Honduras over that quarter of a century and is regarded as a key reformer of the country's financial and economic structure.

Vinelli remained in Honduras as Economic Advisor to the governments of Juan Manuel Gálvez and then Julio Lozano Díaz. In October 1956, Lozano was overthrown by a military junta. At the time, one of Vinelli's responsibilities was to manage the budget of the country. He had a disagreement with the new military leadership over expenses and they exiled him. He moved to the United States for several months.

In 1957 he returned to Honduras. By the end of that year he joined Banco Atlántida, one of the largest private banks in the country, as Assistant to the chief executive officer (CEO). He remained with the bank for forty years. From 1978 to 1995 he was CEO and chairman of the board, and then remained chairman of the board from 1995 until his death at age 74 in 1997.

Vinelli had a transformative effect on Banco Atlántida and on banking in Honduras in general. Inside Banco Atlántida, he created generous retirement and health plans for employees. In the mid 60's, he helped the Vaccaro and D'Antoni family sell their majority interest in Banco Atlántida to Chase Manhattan Bank, making Banco Atlántida the first correspondent bank of Chase in Central America. He and David Rockefeller, chief executive officer of Chase, developed a good working relationship during the decade that Chase had majority ownership in Banco Atlántida. Chase introduced new banking systems that made Banco Atlántida the most modern bank in Honduras, and other local banks followed its model. Under Vinelli's leadership Banco Atlántida became the largest bank in Honduras, both in assets and in number of bank branches.

In the 1960s and 1970s Vinelli led a horizontal diversification of Banco Atlántida into a group that invested in multiple financial services, such as insurance (Seguros Atlántida) and information technology. The diversified model was later imitated by other major banks in Honduras. He also spearheaded a group of investors to create and grow a wide variety of companies, bringing advanced know-how to many industries. Some of the companies he helped start or grow were: Embotelladora La Reyna (Pepsi Cola bottling company), Hoteles de Honduras which owns the historic Hotel Honduras Maya, Cartonera Nacional, Convertidora Nacional de Papél y Cartón (paper/cardboard), Lotificadora San Fernando, Lotificadora Industrial, Rancho El Coco (real estate).

Vinelli attended the International Monetary Fund and the World Bank annual meetings from 1950 to 1996. From 1968 to 1996 he was an alternate governor and then director of the Federación Latinoamericana de Bancos (FELABAN). The international banking contacts he made at these meetings were beneficial not only to Banco Atlántida but also to the government of Honduras, who he continued to advise in different capacities over his lifetime.

== Personal life ==
=== Family ===
Vinelli married five times. His wives were:

- Linda Reisman: born in Tallinn, Estonia. They had four sons: John, Craig, Robert, and Richard. Linda died of cancer in Tegucigalpa, Honduras in 1956 at age 34. They were married for twelve years.
- Iris Ulargui: born in Amapala, Honduras. They had no children and divorced two years after marrying. Iris died of pulmonary emphysema in Tegucigalpa, Honduras in 1994 at age 81.
- Maria Esther Mejía: born in Tegucigalpa, Honduras. They had one daughter, Elizabeth. They divorced one year after marrying. María Esther died in New York City in 1966 at age 46.
- Frances Smith: born in Boonville, Missouri, US. They had two daughters, Gigi and Pia. They divorced in 1978 after seventeen years of marriage. Frances died in Houston, Texas in 2021 at age 96. She was known for being one of the last surviving Rosie the Riveters.
- Maria Mastahinich: of Croatian descent, born in San Marcos, Guatemala. They had no children and were married for eighteen years until Vinelli died in 1997. Maria died of Parkinson's disease in Tegucigalpa, Honduras in 2011 at age 77.

=== Kidnapping ===
On December 18, 1980, Vinelli was kidnapped while being driven to work. Three women and two men orchestrated the attack, killing his bodyguard and blinding his driver. He was kept in a safe house in Tegucigalpa for 75 days while the kidnappers negotiated the ransom with his family. He was released on March 2, 1981. It was later revealed that the organization who held him was the Farabundo Martí National Liberation Front (FMLN) of El Salvador.

=== Death ===
Vinelli died following heart surgery on February 18, 1997, at age 74 in Houston, Texas. He was buried in Tegucigalpa, Honduras, the city where he lived the last forty-seven years of his life.

== Leadership positions ==
- 1996 –1997 – Ambassador for Honduras – Food and Agriculture Organization of the United Nations (FAO)
- 1993–1997 – Director, International Board of Visitors – Zamorano Agricultural School - 1997 – Founder, Alternate Governor, Director – Federación Latinoamericana de Bancos (FELABAN)
- 1991 – 1997 – Director – Banco Latinoamericano de Exportaciones y Importaciones (BLADEX)
- 1981 – Director, Board of Governors – Inter-American Development Bank
- Director – INCAE Business School
- 1965 – 1975 – Director – Honduran Red Cross
- 1960–1962 – President of board of directors, instrumental in the building of current location – American School of Tegucigalpa

== Patron of the arts ==
Vinelli was a mentor for many Honduran painters in the last half of the twentieth century. These included Jose Antonio Velásquez, Carlos Garay, Luis Padilla, Sergio Almendares, César Ordoñez, Arturo López Rodezno, Maury Flores, Roque Zelaya, Hermes Maltéz, Benigno Gómez, Miguel Angel Ruiz Matute, German Durón Lanza, and Manuel Rodriguez Lazaroni. Through his initiative, Banco Atlántida built the most complete collection of Honduran paintings.

Vinelli also created important collections of Mayan artifacts, stamps, coins and bills at Banco Atlántida. He anticipated Honduras would eventually have a museum to house these collections. Until that happens, Banco Atlántida holds exhibits for students and for the public in its Salon Culturál.

== Awards ==
- Posthumous Recognition, Zamorano Agricultural School (1997)
- Brassavola de Oro, Museo del Hombre Hondureño (1996)
- Order of Bernardo O'Higgins, Chile (1994)
- Order of Jose Cecilio del Valle, Gran Cruz, Placa de Plata, Honduras (1993)
- Order of Vasco Nuñez de Balboa, Panama (1991)
- Godfather of UNAH graduation ceremony, Tegucigalpa, Honduras (1987)
- Hoja de Liquidambar en Plata, Grado de Oficial, Tegucigalpa Metropolitan Council (1978)
- Honor of Merit, for founding the School of Economics of Universidad Nacional Autónoma de Honduras, Tegucigalpa, Honduras (1975)
- Order of Merit – Commendatore, Italy (1968)
- U.S. State Department Honor Scroll (1967)
- Presidential decoration of Honduras, for banking/monetary reform (1951)

== Publications ==
- "New Taxation Trends in Latin America" (1945); Federal Reserve Board of Governors
- Estudio Sobre la Economía de Honduras (1950); IMF for Banco Central de Honduras; written with Javier Márquez, Alexander McLeod, Julio Gonzalez del Solar
- The Currency and Exchange System of Honduras (1951); IMF Staff Papers, 1951 Vol. 1, Issue 1, 420–431
- Balances de Liquidaciones Presupuestarias del Gobierno Central 1924–25/1951–52 (1953) co-wrote w Manuel Tosco
- Política del Banco Central de Honduras 1950–1953 (1953); Banco Central de Honduras
- La Reforma Presupuestaria (1953); Banco Central de Honduras; written with Manuel Tosco
- Desarrollo de la Bolsa de Valores (1953); Banco Central de Honduras
- "La Economía Hondureña: rasgos generales de su desenvolvimiento"; Honduras, Realidad Nacional y Crisis Regional (1986); Centro de Documentación de Honduras y Florida International University
