= Germany–Honduras relations =

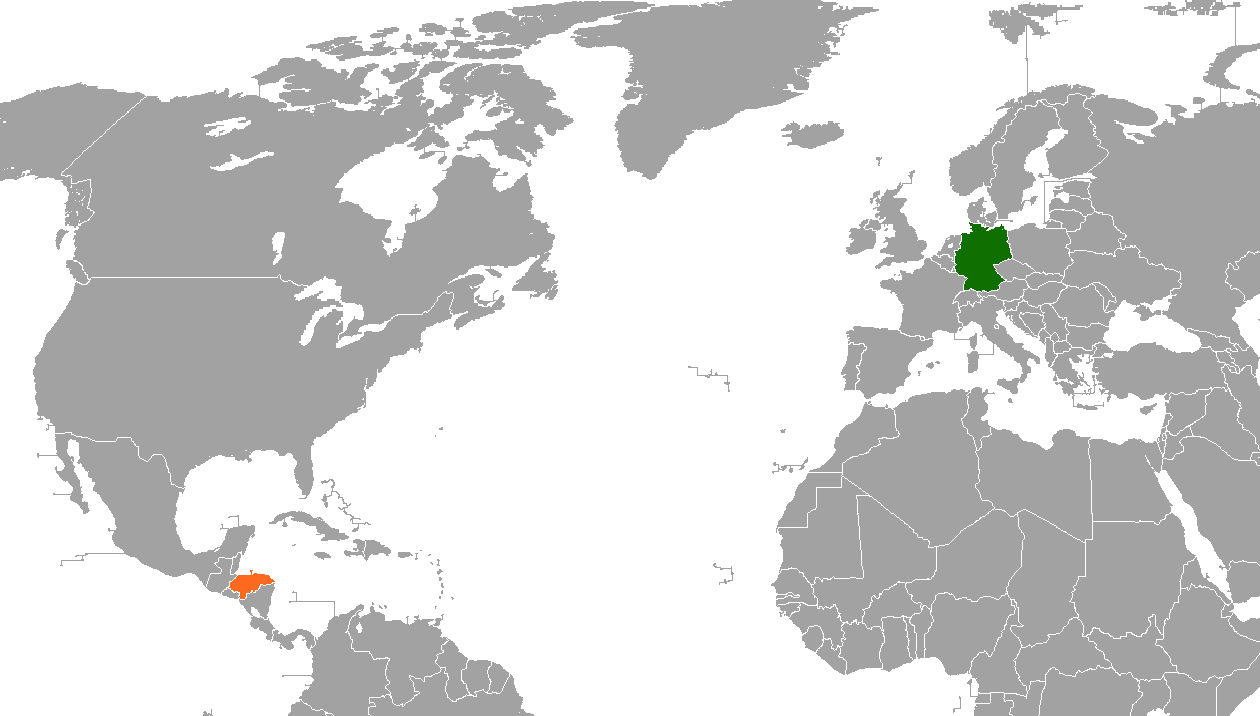

- Germany: Honduras

Germany–Honduras relations are the bilateral relations between Germany and Honduras. The Federal Foreign Office describes the bilateral relations as “traditionally friendly”.

== History ==
In 1876, Werner von Bergen, the German Empire's consul general for Central America (Guatemala, Costa Rica, Nicaragua, El Salvador and Honduras), signed a friendship, trade, shipping and consular treaty with Honduras., which established diplomatic relations and gave a significant boost to coffee exports from Central America to Germany. In Central America, Germany became an important economic partner, which challenged the Monroe Doctrine of the United States. Honduras also received some individual investments from Germany, but the center of German activity was in Costa Rica and Guatemala, where numerous German immigrants also settled. Some Germans also settled in Honduras. In 1903, for example, the German immigrant Carlos Hartling composed the national anthem of Honduras.

The two world wars ended German influence in Central America. Honduras declared war on the German Empire in 1918 and 1941 respectively, and economic relations were interrupted. On 20 January 1960, after the end of the Second World War, Honduras established diplomatic relations with the Federal Republic of Germany (West Germany). Diplomatic relations with East Germany were never established. Honduras opened an embassy in Bad Godesberg in 1961, which was relocated to the Hansa district of Berlin in 2000.

== Economic relations ==
In 2024, German exports of goods to Honduras were worth 297 million euros and imports from the country 362 million euros. Honduras thus ranked 101st among Germany's trading partners. Germany is Honduras' most important trade partner within the EU. Germany mainly imports coffee and textiles from Honduras and exports industrial and chemical products in return. There is a German-Honduran Chamber of Commerce.

Germany, along with the United States and Spain, is one of Honduras's most important development cooperation donor countries. GIZ and KfW are both present in Honduras, as are numerous German NGOs. The main focus of German development aid is on environmental protection, migration, youth violence prevention, school infrastructure and renewable energies. Germany has also repeatedly provided assistance in the event of natural disasters, such as after Hurricane Mitch in 1998, and is supporting the country in adapting to climate change.

== Cultural relations ==
Two German cultural centers and the Friedrich Ebert Foundation have been active in Honduras since 1982.

The German-Honduran Society (Deutsch-Honduranische Gesellschaft) was founded in 2000 and carries out various social projects in the country.

== Diplomatic missions ==
- Germany has an embassy in Tegucigalpa.
- Honduras has an embassy in Berlin.

== See also ==
- Foreign relations of Germany
- Foreign relations of Honduras
