= BANADESA =

Bank of Honduras

- Type: State-owned enterprise
- Industry: Financial services
- Founded: February 16, 1950; 76 years ago
- Headquarters: Tegucigalpa, Honduras
- Key people: Carlos Noé Ramírez (CEO)
- Products: development bank
- Owner: Government of Honduras
- Website: www.banadesa.hn

BANADESA, or the National Bank for Agricultural Development (Spanish: Banco Nacional de Desarrollo Agrícola), is a financial development bank in Honduras.

It is an autonomous institution of the State of Honduras and its aims are to promote development in the country and provide access to credit for entrepreneurs and livestock and cattle farming, among others.

== History ==
It was founded on February 16, 1950, under the name BANAFOM or National Development Bank of Honduras (Spanish: Banco Nacional de Fomento de Honduras) and opened on the first of July of the same year.

In the 1980s it was renamed BANADESA through Decree No. 903 dated 24 March 1980. Honduran president Juan Orlando Hernández appointed Carlos Noe Ramirez as the new manager in August 2015.
