= 2021 in Honduras =

- Decades: 2000s; 2010s; 2020s
- See also: Other events of 2021; Timeline of Honduran history

The National Autonomous University of Honduras received a delivery of equipment from the IAEA to accelerate COVID-19 testing capacities. 21 February 2021

Events of 2021 in Honduras.

== Incumbents ==
- President: Juan Orlando Hernández
- President of the National Congress: Mauricio Oliva

== Events ==
=== January to June ===
- January 2 – A Honduran national identified as Leidy Hernández, 24, gives birth while crossing the bridge between Matamoros, Tamaulipas and Brownsville, Texas. The baby will be entitled to Mexican citizenship.
- January 9 – Prosecutors in the United States District Court for the Southern District of New York accuse former President Juan Orlando Hernández of taking bribes and protecting drug traffickers.
- January 13 – Two hundred migrants march towards San Pedro Sula en route to Guatemala, where they are expected to meet 2,000 police and military units.
- January 21 – The National Congress of Honduras outlaws abortion in all forms.
- February 11 – Dozens protest the death of nursing student Keyla Patricia Martínez, who died while in police custody, insisting her death be investigated as homicide.
- February 8 – An eight-year old Honduran boy drowns while trying to cross the Rio Grande (Río Bravo del Norte) near Piedras Negras, Coahuila. His parents identified the body after being arrested by U.S. immigration agents.
- February 23 – U.S.Senator Jeff Merkley (D-OR) introduces legislation to restrict security aid to Honduras and to investigate President Orlando Hernández for corruption and ties to drug traffickers.
- February 24 – Orlando Hernández warns that U.S.—Honduran cooperation on drug trafficking could collapse if members of Los Cachiros cartel are allowed to give ″false testimony″ against him in U.S. courts.
- March 8 – The trial of Geovanny Fuentes Ramirez, 50, on cocaine, weapons, and bribery charges begins in New York.
- March 9 – New York prosecutors say Honduras is a ″narco-state″ and that Geovanny Fuentes Ramirez reported “directly to Tony Hernández,” the president’s brother.
- March 19 – Father's Day and Saint Joseph′s Day.
- March 28–April 3 — Holy Week
- March 30
  - Tony Hernández is found guilty of state-sponsored drug trafficking and fined US$138 million.
  - Hundreds of migrants who lack proper identification papers and proof of negative COVID-19 tests are turned back by police at Corinto, Honduras.

=== July to December ===
- September 15 – Independence Day, 206th anniversary of the Act of Independence of Central America.
- October 2 - 2021 Guanaja fire
- October 3 – Francisco Morazán Day, honors the 2nd president of the Federal Republic of Central America (1835–1839).

== Sports ==
- 2020–21 Honduran Liga Nacional

== Deaths ==
- February 6 – Keyla Patricia Martínez, 26 or 28, nursing student in La Esperanza, Intibucá Department; murder by choking while in police custody.
- February 12 – Celso Güity, 63, footballer (Marathón, Sula, national team); cancer.
- March 22 – Juan Carlos Cerros Escalante, 41, indegnous environmental activist (Lenca); shot
- April 25 - Pablo José Cámbar, 78, academic, COVID-19
- April 28 - Chelato Uclés, 80, footballer
- July 28 - Porfirio Armando Betancourt, 63, footballer
- October 1 - Nora Gúnera de Melgar, 78, politician, first lady

== See also ==
- 2021 in Central America
- COVID-19 pandemic in Honduras
- 2021 Atlantic hurricane season
- Public holidays in Honduras
