= 2022 in Honduras =

- Decades: 2000s; 2010s; 2020s
- See also: Other events of 2022; Timeline of Honduran history

Events of 2022 in Honduras.

== Incumbents ==
- President: Juan Orlando Hernández (until 27 January 2022); Xiomara Castro onwards
- President of the National Congress: Mauricio Oliva (until 25 January 2022); Luis Redondo onwards

== Events ==
- January 27 – Xiomara Castro is officially sworn in as the 56th President of Honduras, making her the country's first female president.
- February 6 – President Xiomara Castro tests positive for COVID-19.
- February 14 –The United States Department of Justice asks Honduras for the arrest and extradition of former Honduran President Juan Orlando Hernández, who left office less than a month ago.
- February 15 – Former Honduran President Juan Orlando Hernández is arrested in Tegucigalpa after the U.S. requested his extradition on charges of drug trafficking.
- March 28 – Courts decide that former Honduran President Juan Orlando Hernández will be extradited to the United States on drug trafficking charges.
- April 24 – Honduran President Xiomara Castro declares a state of emergency in the Colón Department following the death of three policemen in an ambush in Trujillo. The announced objective is to apprehend the perpetrators.
- July 6 – The government of Honduras releases a report stating that the deportation of Honduran migrants from Mexico and the United States increased by 84.4% during the first half of the year.
- July 24 – Police in Honduras intensify their crackdown on gangs in response to last week's murder of the son of former president Porfirio Lobo Sosa.

== Sports ==
- 2021–22 Honduran Liga Nacional

== Deaths ==
- March 11 – Guayo Cedeño, 48, musician and record producer, respiratory failure

== See also ==
- COVID-19 pandemic in Honduras
- 2022 Atlantic hurricane season
- Public holidays in Honduras
