= 2020 in Honduras =

- Decades: 2000s; 2010s; 2020s
- See also: Other events of 2020; Timeline of Honduran history

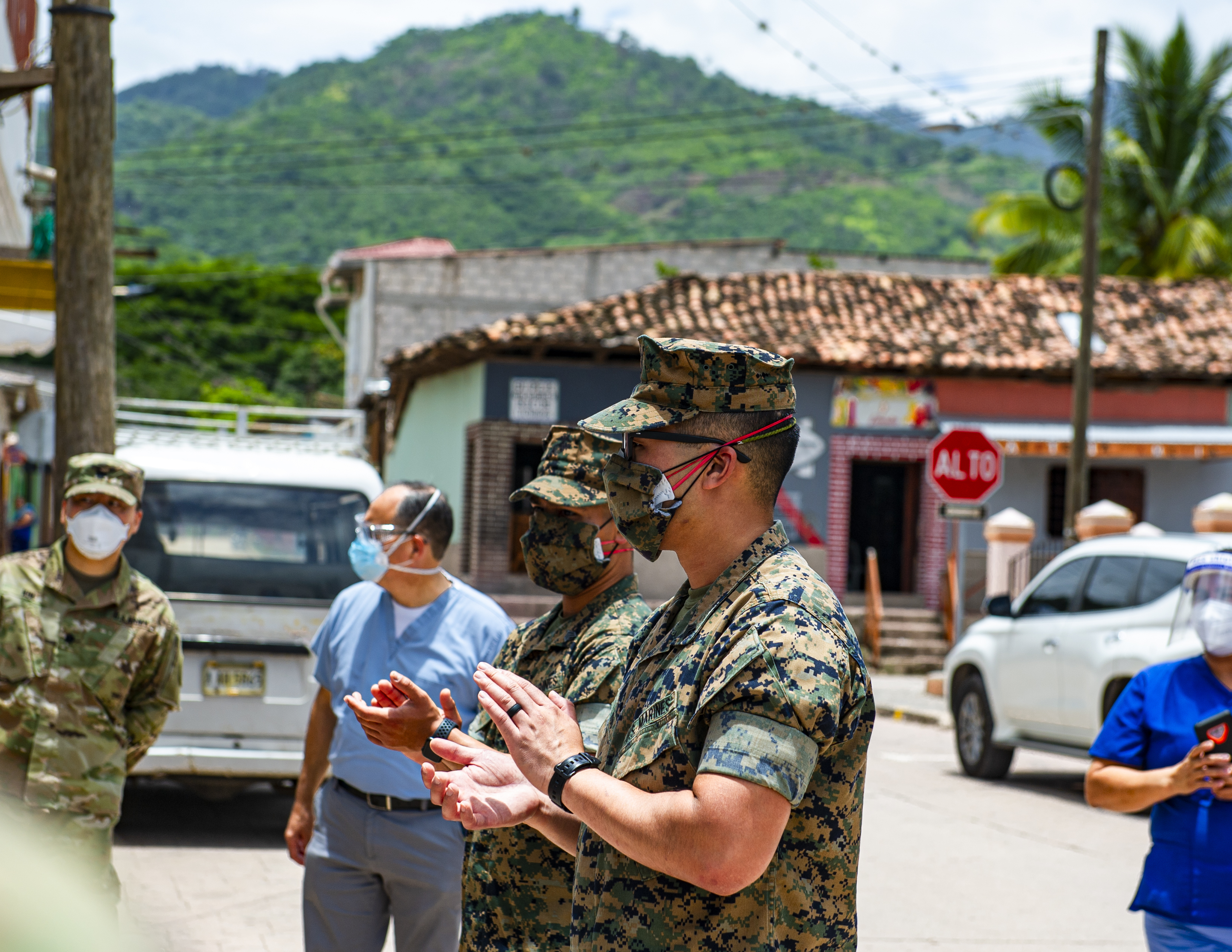
US marines in Honduras to provide protective gear

Events of 2020 in Honduras.

== Incumbents ==
- President: Juan Orlando Hernández
- President of the National Congress: Mauricio Oliva

== Events ==
- February 18 – 2020 CONACAF Champions League: F.C. Motagua v. Atlanta United FC at Estadio Olimpico Metropolitano in San Pedro Sula.
- February 20 – 2020 CONCACAF Champions League: C.D. Olimpia v. Seattle Sounders FC at Estadio Olímpico Metropolitano in San Pedro Sula.
- February 25 – 2020 CONACAF Champions League: F.C. Motagua v. Atlanta United FC at Fifth Third Bank Stadium in Kennesaw, Georgia.
- February 27 – 2020 CONACAF Champions League: C.D. Olimpia v. Seattle Sounders FC at CenturyLink Field in Seattle, Washington.
- March 10 – 2020 CONACAF Champions League: C.D. Olimpia v. Montreal Impact at Olympic Stadium (Montreal).
- June 4 – 2020 CONCACAF Nations League Final Championship: Honduras national football team v. United States men's national soccer team at BBVA Stadium in Houston, Texas.
- August 30 – Honduras's debt increased US $10,833 billion in the first quarter of 2020, 19.9% more than in 2019.
- September 10 – Children's Day: The day is marked by increased poverty due to the pandemic.
- September 11 – María Antonia Rivera, Secretary of Economic Development, announces the program Honduras Se Levanta (Honduras Wakes Up) to bring back 70,000 jobs. The COVID-19 pandemic has cost 2,049 deaths and 65,800 illnesses.
- September 15 – Independence Day (from Spain, 1821), national holiday Flags fly at half-mast in mourning for the 1,873 Hondurans who have died because of the COVID-19 pandemic.
- November 16 – Hurricane Iota: Category 5 hurricane is expected to make landfall in Honduras and Nicaragua.
- December 9 – Six hundred men, women, and children are stopped in San Pedro Sula and asked for travel documents before starting a migration caravan to the United States. At least 3 million people were effected by Hurricane Eta before Hurricane Iota hit the area.
- December 21 – The Economic Commission for Latin America and the Caribbean (ECLAC) says that the damage from hurricanes Eta and Iota was far less than government estimates. ECLAC reports 4 million people affected with 2.5 million people in need, 92,000 people in shelters, and 62,000 houses affected, and the damage is estimated at US $1.9 billion. President Juan Orlando Hernández called the two storms "the worst in Honduras history," but damages were greater in Hurricane Mitch in 1998.
- December 28 – The U.S. cuts military aid to El Salvador, Guatemala, and Honduras.

== Deaths ==
- April 4 – Rafael Leonardo Callejas Romero, politician and former President (b. 1943).
- July 18 – David Romero Ellner, journalist and politician.
- December 26
  - Cirilo Nelson, 82, botanist.
  - Felix Vasquez, defender of environmental and human rights; murdered.
- December 27 – Jose Adan Medina, Tolupan leader; shot.

== See also ==
- 2020 in Central America
- COVID-19 pandemic in Honduras
- 2020 Atlantic hurricane season
