= 2025 in Honduras =

- Decades: 2000s; 2010s; 2020s
- See also: Other events of 2025; Timeline of Honduran history

Events of 2025 in Honduras.

== Incumbents ==
- President: Xiomara Castro
- First Vice President: Doris Gutiérrez
- Second Vice President: Vacant
- Third Vice President: Renato Florentino
- President of the National Congress: Luis Redondo

== Events ==
=== January ===
- 1 January – President Xiomara Castro threatens to remove all US military bases from Honduras and seek to cancel the military cooperation with the United States if President-elect Donald Trump fulfills his threat to order mass deportations of Hondurans when he takes office.

=== February ===
- 8 February – A magnitude 7.6 earthquake hits the Caribbean Sea off the coast of Honduras.
- 18 February – President Castro announces an agreement to extend Honduras's extradition agreement with the United States.

=== March ===
- 17 March – Aerolínea Lanhsa Flight 018, a light aircraft operated by Aerolínea Lanhsa crashes shortly after takeoff from Roatan, killing 12 of the 17 people on board including Garifuna musician Aurelio Martínez.

=== July ===
- 24 July – Honduras mandates face masks again in public spaces amid a spike in respiratory illnesses, including COVID-19, and orders temporary remote work for state institutions.

=== October ===
- 29 October – The Attorney-General's office opens an investigation into a leaked audio recording allegedly showing National Electoral Council member Cossette Lopez-Osorio conspiring with Armed Forces of Honduras to influence the results of the 2025 Honduran general election.

=== November ===
- 28 November – US President Donald Trump promise to pardon former President Juan Orlando Hernández—a member of the National Party—who is currently serving a 45-year prison sentence in the United States for drug trafficking.
- 30 November – 2025 Honduran general election

=== December ===
- 2 December – Former president Juan Orlando Hernandez is released from prison in the United States after receiving a pardon from US president Donald Trump.
- 8 December – The Attorney-General's office issues an arrest warrant against former president Juan Orlando Hernandez.
- 19 December – The Trump administration imposes sanctions on National Electoral Council member Marlon Ochoa and Electoral Justice Tribunal magistrate Mario Morazán, accusing them of interfering with the counting of results from the 2025 Honduran general election.
- 24 December – 2025 Honduran general election: The National Electoral Council declares Nasry Asfura as winner of the presidential election with a voting plurality of 40.3% following a long-delayed count.

== Holidays ==
- 1 January – New Year's Day
- 18–20 April – Holy Week
- 14 April – Americas Day
- 1 May – Labour Day
- 15 September – Independence Day
- 3 October – Francisco Morazán Birthday
- 12 October – Day of the Race
- 21 October – Army Day
- 25 December – Christmas Day

== Deaths ==
- 17 March – Aurelio Martínez, 55, musician
- 30 October – Juan Matta-Ballesteros, 80, convicted drug trafficker and murderer
