= 2026 in Honduras =

- Decades: 2000s; 2010s; 2020s
- See also: Other events of 2026; Timeline of Honduran history

Events of 2026 in Honduras.

== Incumbents ==
- President: Xiomara Castro (until 27 January), Nasry Asfura (from 27 January)
- First Vice President: Doris Gutiérrez (until January 27), María Antonieta Mejía (from 27 January)
- Second Vice President: Vacant (until 27 January), Carlos Flores Guifarro, (from 27 January)
- Third Vice President: Renato Florentino (until 27 January), Diana Herrera (from 27 January)
- President of the National Congress: Luis Redondo

== Events ==
=== January ===
- 8 January – Gladis Aurora López Calderón, the vice president of the National Congress of Honduras, is injured after being hit with an explosive device at a National Party press briefing inside the Legislative Palace.
- 17 January – A magnitude 5.7 earthquake hits Omoa, damaging 50 houses.
- 27 January – Nasry Asfura is sworn in as the new president of Honduras for the 2026–2030 term.

=== March ===
- 4 March – Honduras cancels a cooperation agreement with Cuba that allowed Cuban medical professionals to operate in the country.

=== April ===
- 8 April – A bus collides with a truck near Quimistán, killing eight people.

=== May ===
- 12 May – Former Tocoa mayor Adán Fúnez is arrested on suspicion of masterminding the murder of environmental activist Juan López in 2024.
- 21 May –
  - Nineteen people are killed in a shooting at a plantation in Trujillo.
  - Six police officers are killed in a shooting on their convoy in Omoa.

=== July ===
- 24 July – The United States imposes a 10% tariff on Honduras, citing the presence of alleged forced labor in the supply chain.

=== August ===
- 16 August – Israel and Honduras sign an agreement to boost defense operation.

== Holidays ==
- 1 January – New Year's Day
- 2–4 April – Holy Week
- 13 April – Americas Day
- 1 May – Labour Day
- 15 September – Independence Day
- 1 October – Francisco Morazán Birthday
- 2 October – Day of the Race
- 3 October – Army Day
- 25 December – Christmas Day

== Deaths ==
- 14 May – Jorge Urquía, 76, footballer (Mallorca, Alavés, national team)
- 28 September – Teodoro Gómez, 63, Roman Catholic prelate, auxiliary bishop of Tegucigalpa (2020–2023) and bishop of Choluteca (since 2023)
