= 2015 Honduran protests =

- Date: 29 May 2015 – August 28, 2015
- Location: Honduras
- Caused by: Corruption scandals and fraud; Embezzlement in the 2013 Honduran general election; $200 Million embezzled in corruption scandal
- Goals: Resignation of President Juan Orlando Hernandez; Fresh general elections
- Methods: Demonstrations
- Result: Protests end with anti-corruption cabinet

The 2015 Honduran protests was mass protests and social demonstrations in Honduras consisting of nonviolent resistance rallies led by the grassroots opposition movement that began a street protest campaign against the government of Juan Orlando Hernandez after corruption scandals rocked the country in 2015.

== Protests ==
Strikes began on 29 May with protesters coming in their tens of thousands, protesting in a countywide movement against corruption. Anti-corruption marches was on the rise and rallies was taking place all across the country. Protesters waved red-white-red flags and chanted the national anthem, also saying Our Central American Spring, referring to the wave of protests in Central America.

Hundreds of thousands blocked streets and formed human chains, using nonviolent resistance demonstrations and formed protests across June–July demanding social reforms and the resignations of the entire cabinet of Juan Orlando Hernandez. Demonstrators also called on an investigation into the scandals. Protesters persisted the pot-banning protests and continued.

Protesters muted roads, used candlelight’s in solidarity with the 2015 Guatemalan protests and protested peacefully against the government. Anti-corruption pickets was also held by other cities nationwide, not only Tegucigalpa. Rallies raged on despite calls for an end to protest by Orlando. Social media also called on the movement to protest against corruption scandals in other countries, even though a trend of anti-corruption protests is rising.

Thousands participated in acts of nonviolent civil disobedience movement in the country as strikers saw worker protests and angry citizens joined the protesters. 25,000 protesters marched onto the presidential palace. The unprecedented wave of massive demonstrations and the largest protest movement in Honduras since 1980 saw no police actions.

Demonstrators participated in their last rallies in July–August which was still large, with 20,000 participants. Furious at corruption, demonstrators called on the government of Juan Orlando Hernandez and protesters waved torches and used candles despite furore over the government. Street protests had become smaller in late-August, being the last action of protest in the country in 2015.

== See also ==
- 2017-2018 Honduran protests
- 2019 Honduran protests
- 2015 Guatemalan protests
