= 2019 in Honduras =

- Decades: 1990s; 2000s; 2010s; 2020s
- See also: Other events of 2019; Timeline of Honduran history

Events in the year 2019 in Honduras.

== Incumbents ==
- President – Juan Orlando Hernández
- National congress president – Mauricio Oliva

== Events ==
- August 20: Former First Lady Rosa Elena Bonilla is convicted for embezzling U.S.$600,000 between 2010 and 2014. Her brother-in-law Mauricio Mora was acquitted.
- Since October 4 : protests against Juan Orlando Hernández

== Deaths ==
- 12 January – Jaime Rosenthal, politician, Third Vice President and MP (b. 1936).
