= 2017–2018 Honduran protests =

2017–18 Honduran protests
- Part of the aftermath of the Honduran general election, 2017
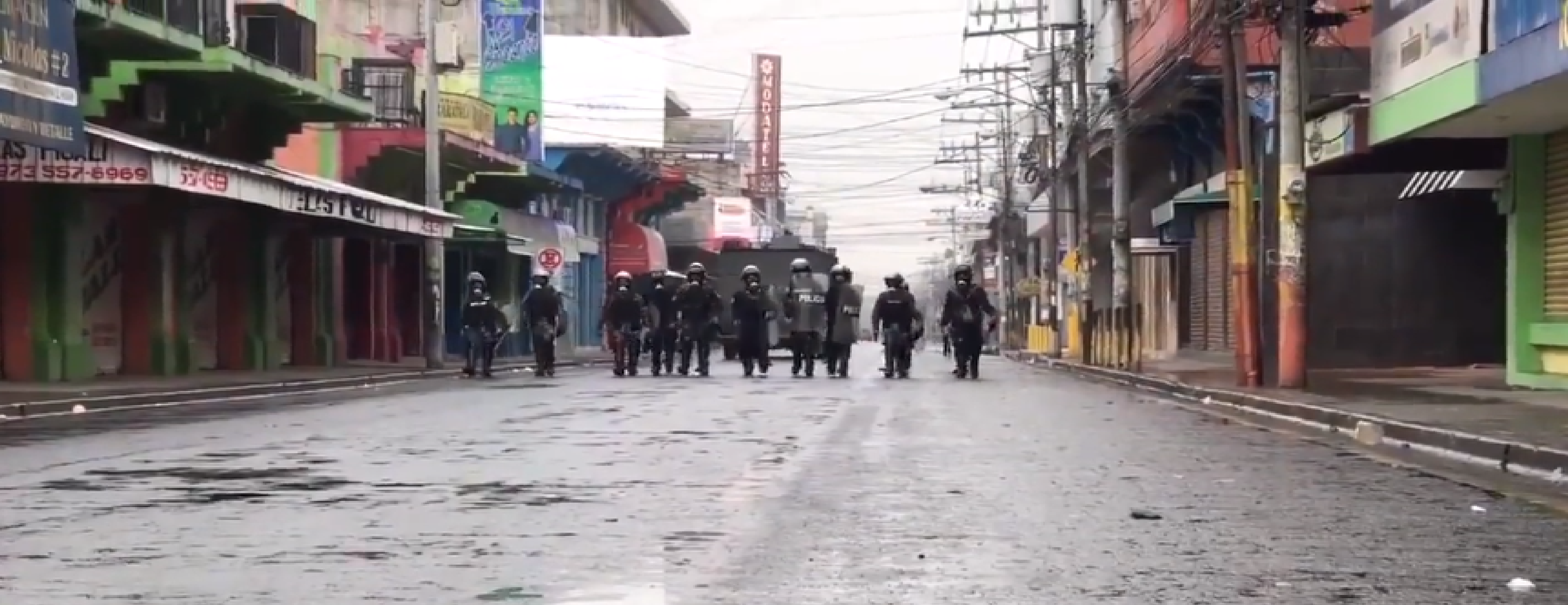
- Police marching during the Protest
- Date: 27 November 2017—11 December 2018
- Location: Honduras
- Caused by: Fraud allegations
- Methods: Demonstrations, riots, cacerolazos, street blockades, strike action

Parties
Honduran Protesters	Government of Honduras; Honduras Police

Casualties
- Deaths: 38
- Injuries: 20+
- Arrested: 1,675

The 2017–18 Honduran protests were occurring throughout the country during the 2017 general election.

== Background ==
President Juan Orlando Hernandez was accused of his 2013 presidential campaign receiving illicit funds out of the Honduran Social Security Institute in 2015. Later on in 2017, allegations of fraud damaged his re-election, and aggression soon followed. The consequences of the post-election dispute between the law enforcement and the protesters includes 23 deaths and 1,351 arrests.

On 30 November, with approximately 94% of the votes counted, Juan Orlando Hernández's lead had climbed to 42.92% compared to 41.42% for Nasralla. On 1 December, the TSE announced that they would give no further results until the TSE had been able to review all of the 1,031 tally sheets which had not been properly filled out by the political parties. The 1,031 tally sheets represent 5.69% of the total vote. Later that same day, as the TSE was still trying to convoke 60 representatives and four supervisors for both Nasralla and Hernández for the final vote count, Hernández's cabinet announced a ten-day curfew from 6pm to 6am to try to calm the violence associated with the protests.

As the government's plan to reshape and modify the nation's healthcare and the schooling infrastructure, which both have a large number of government workers, the rage and frustration began to rise as a response. On 2 December, the Honduran National Roundtable for Human Rights issued a press release, in which it declared that the government actions were state terrorism against civilians, it warned that the declaration of a state of exception was in order to create repression to ensure electoral fraud labeling it as illegal after reading several articles of the Honduran constitution. As the protests spread wider, the people's want for President Hernandez's resignation increased which led to excessive uses of force and police conflict when a new penal code was published in early May.

The protests were not only a political issue, but also an economic one too. In Honduras, 60 percent of the population lived below the poverty line. Along with that suffering, the country also struggles with unemployment, in which only 20 percent of the population earn minimum wage. The protests worsened the state of the country's economy by the strikes and blockades costing above 400 million dollars. With an increase in economic issues, there was a growing number of security issues. Regardless of the decrease in homicide rates between 2011 and 2019, Honduras has remained one of the most violent countries in the world. Statistics show that the police declared 192 additional homicides from the months of April to June compared to the same timeframe the year before. While there was a 50 percent rise in mass killings during a similar period which was indicated by the Honduran Observatory of Violence. As a result of the economic decline, the political rise, and security issues, many people have decided to leave Honduras. To add to the negative situations that the people went through, climate change introduced a drought, which impacted more than 170,000 thousand families. This caused around 300 people to flee Honduras every day. Since October 2018, around 175,000 thousand people that tried to flee got caught at the U.S. southern border. On June 24, 2019, military forces opened fire on students at the Autonomous University of Honduras in Tegucigalpa, just four days following Hernandez commands on the military to suppress protests nationwide.

== Timeline ==
The 2017 re-election of Juan Orlando Hernández in Honduras was marked by widespread controversy and allegations of electoral misconduct. The TSE finally announced a winner on 17 December, giving Hernández the victory with 42.95% of the vote to Nasralla's 41.42%. The announcement sparked a new wave of protests across the country, with Mel Zelaya announcing a national strike. The country's two major cities - Tegucigalpa and San Pedro Sula - saw streets blockaded, their main exits blocked, and traffic between them severely reduced. On the second night of the curfew, thousands of people participated in what is known as "cacerolazos", banging pots and pans in protest. The protests which were met with militant backlash leftat least 38 people dead and thousands detained by early 2018.

The Organization of American States (OAS) and the European Union Election Observation Mission (EU-EOM) both flagged major issues with the election. The OAS questioned the results, recommending a new election as the only path to a credible outcome, while the EU-EOM called for comprehensive electoral reforms. Proposed reforms included strengthening oversight by the Supreme Electoral Tribunal (TSE), ensuring transparency in political financing, and amending campaign finance laws. OAS secretary general Luis Almagro issued a statement following the TSE's announcement saying: "Facing the impossibility of determining a winner, the only way possible so that the people of Honduras are the victors is a new call for general elections." Hernández rejected the OAS's position, and his top aide accused of OAS of seeking "to try and steal the election" for Nasralla.

The controversy intensified as evidence emerged linking Hernández's administration to narcotics trafficking, with allegations that he facilitated cocaine routes to the United States. Although there was significant international backlash against the election process and violent protest suppression, the United States quickly recognized Hernández's victory, citing its longstanding alliance with Honduras for anti-narcotics and security purposes. This stance fueled accusations of foreign complicity in the erosion of democracy in Honduras, even as civil unrest highlighted the deep political and social divisions in the country.

In 2022, Xiomara Castro was elected as the Honduras's first female president, promising to restore trust in the government. Running on a platform of combating inequality, violence, and corruption, Castro's election represents a shift away from the Hernández era. However, the challenges she faces remain significant. Rebuilding public confidence in the political system, strengthening weakened institutions, and addressing longstanding issues of poverty, corruption, and gang violence are now central to her administration's goals. U.S. influence remains prominent, particularly on issues of migration and security, creating a complex environment as Castro's administration works to fulfill its reformist agenda.

== See also ==
- Honduran general election, 2017
- 2009 Honduran constitutional crisis
- List of protests in the 21st century
- 2019 Honduran protests
- 2015 Honduran protests
