= 2019 Honduran protests =

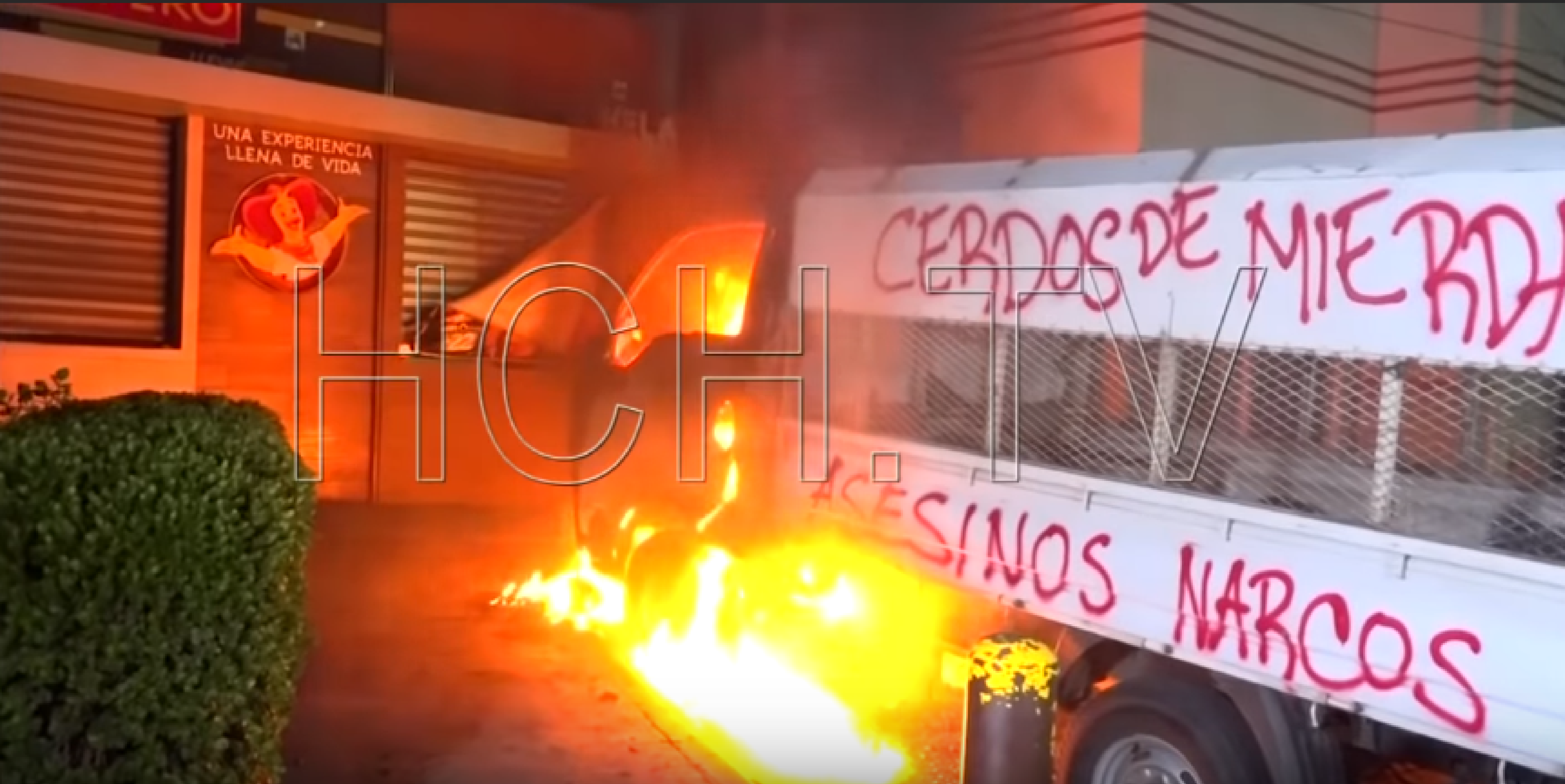
- Protests in Honduras
- Date: April 10th,12th,26th, 2019 - October 25, 2019
- Location: Honduras
- Caused by: Healthcare and education reforms; Corruption; Poverty; Drug links to 2013 Honduran general election
- Goals: Resignation of President Juan Orlando Hernandez; Fresh general elections
- Methods: Demonstrations, Riots
- Result: Protests suppressed by force

The 2019 protests in Honduras corresponded to a series of protests and riots that occurred in April to October, that called for the resignation of President Juan Orlando Hernández; this as a direct consequence of the trial on drug trafficking charges against his brother Tony Hernández, carried out in the United States. These protests first were against the privatisation of health and education then soon turned into an anti-government revolt that killed dozens of people.

== Background ==
After the 2017 Honduran general election, widespread protests and dramatic demonstrations erupted nationwide leading to the 2017-2018 Honduran protests and the violence that ensued. 38 protesters were killed and thousands of demonstrators were detained. Many were injured during clashes at demonstrations in January 2019. Honduras has a stagnant economy and since president Juan Orlando Hernandez took power in the 2013 Honduran general election, the Growth Domestic Product or GDP growth has been slow and steadily. Protests took place in 2015 and 2013 and after the reforms was brought, many had enough.

== Protests ==
In the last week of April, Riot police and protesters have clashed in Tegucigalpa, the capital of Honduras, during a demonstration against education and health reforms. These demonstrations were met with tear gas as protesters threw stones and chanted slogans and cheered on songs against the president and his narco-style dictatorship. Many protesters threw firebombs as a result of the tear gas but the response was still tear gas. Buildings were then set on fire.

On May 30–31, healthcare workers and students threatened a nationwide strike and it went ahead, disrupting airline flights and health services from their routes and work. Mass demonstrations and violent protests rocked the capital Tegucigalpa and other cities.

In June–July, the military forces were sent in to detain and quell the mass unrest from going ahead but it made it even worse. Water cannons was deployed on rock-throwing doctors and students in June while working people went on strike in July. At least 5 protesters were killed in clashes with the security forces in June–July.

On August 7, mass demonstrations were held against the government led by mostly students. Tear gas and live bullets was used to disperse protesters while throwing stones and chanting slogans against president Juan Orlando Hernandez.

On August 18, A series of rioting took place between football teams leaving three dead in clashes. Groups of supporters came out in groups protesting and clapping during the intense clashes.

On Independence Day, anti-government and anti-presidential protests took place throughout the country against president Juan Orlando Hernandez. Brutal violence ignited and turned into rioting.

In October, long-lasting protests and fighting took place in protests. Bullets was fired to disperse protesters on 9 October but they came out on the 10th, chanting songs and cheering on the opposition leader yet police did not intervene. On 21–24 October, a series of riots took place.

== See also ==
- 2017-2018 Honduran protests
- 2019 Ecuadorian protests
- 2019-20 Chilean protests
- 2019 Bolivian protests
