= 2015 in Honduras =

- Decades: 1990s; 2000s; 2010s; 2020s
- See also: Other events of 2015; Timeline of Honduran history

List of events in the year 2015 in Honduras.

== Incumbents ==
- President – Juan Orlando Hernández
- National congress president – Mauricio Oliva
- Supreme Court president – Jorge Alberto Rivera Avilés

== Arts and culture ==
=== March ===
- 3 March - An archaeological expedition finds the legendary White City in northeastern Honduras, with artifacts that date to A.D. 1000 to 1400.
