= Juan Diego Zelaya =

Honduran politician

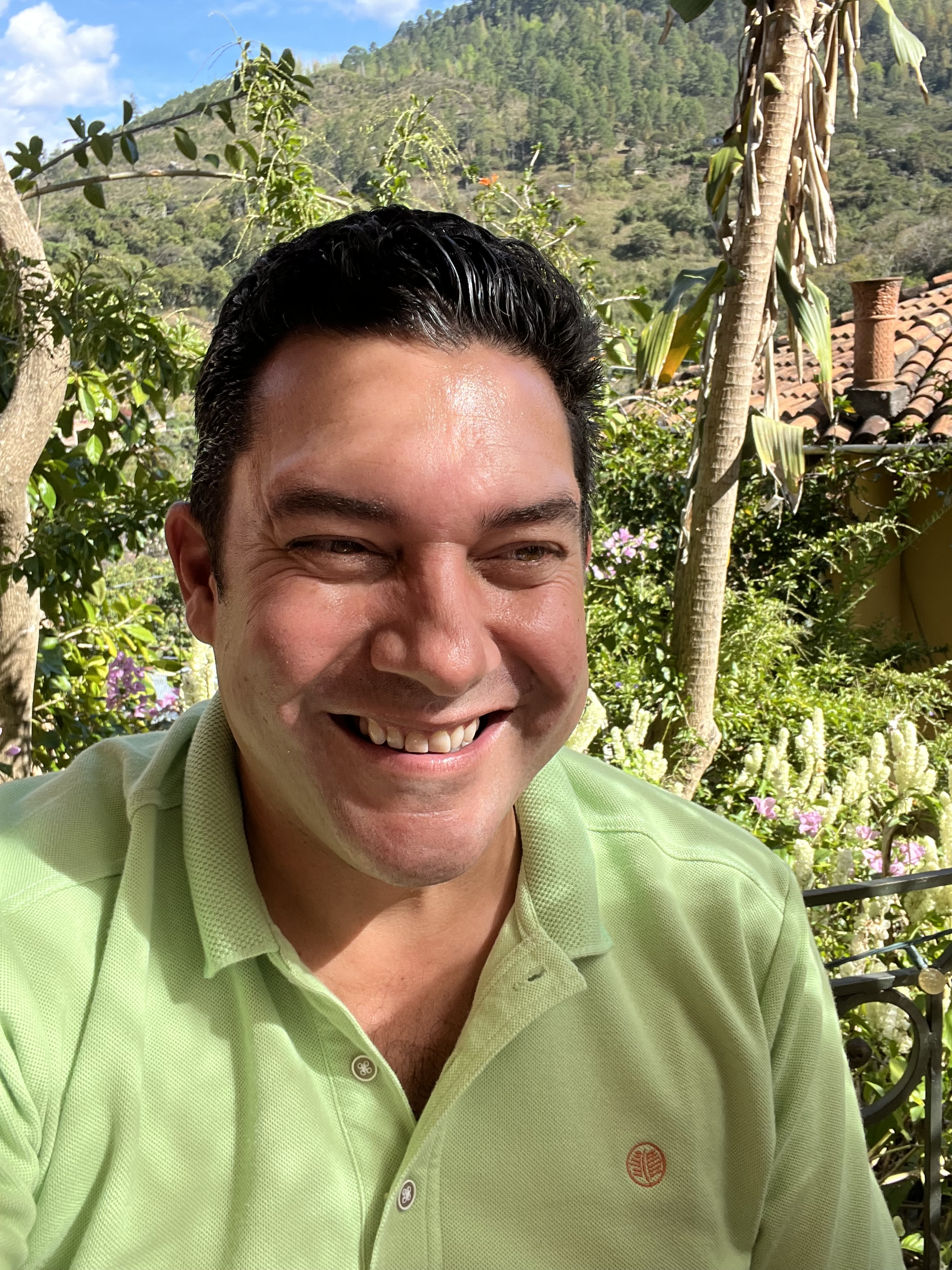
- Diego Zelaya in 2022

Mayor of Tegucigalpa
- Incumbent
- Assumed office 25 January 2026
- Preceded by: Jorge Aldana

Member of the National Congress
- In office 25 January 2014 – 25 January 2022
- President: Mauricio Oliva

Deputy Mayor of Tegucigalpa
- In office 25 January 2010 – 25 January 2014

Personal details
- Born: Juan Diego Zelaya Aguilar; 6 September 1975 (age 51) Honduras
- Party: National Party
- Education: Loyola University New Orleans College of Law

Juan Diego Zelaya Aguilar (born September 6, 1975) is the current Mayor of Tegucigalpa since 25 January 2026. He was also a member of the National Congress of Honduras, serving from 25 January 2014 to 25 January 2022. He also served as the Deputy Mayor of Tegucigalpa from 25 January 2010 to 25 January 2014.

== Early life and career ==
Zelaya was born and raised in Tegucigalpa, Honduras. During his childhood and teen years he lived in Canada (Victoria, British Columbia), Honduras and Boston, Massachusetts, USA. He graduated from Loyola University at New Orleans, earning a bachelor's degree in Business Administration (Finance and Marketing).

Zelaya's business endeavors range from consulting services, sms A2P providers, food and beverage industries, real estate and import/export activities in Central America, Spain and the United States.

In 2002, Zelaya was appointed as National Programme Coordinator for National Telephone Company's Expansion and Modernization project between HONDUTEL (national telco) and UNDP.

== Political career ==
Zelaya won his election to become Tegucigalpa's Lieutenant Mayor in 2009. He was part of the team leading the recovery of public spaces like the historic district with had been flooded by street vendors for 30 years.

In the 2013 National Elections, Zelaya won one of the 128 seats in the Honduran Congress, running for the state of Francisco Morazán for the National Party of Honduras.

He was reelected in the 2017 general elections and served until January 2022.

In October 2015, Zelaya was elected as the National Party's Executive secretary. He was confirmed as Executive Secretary again in June 2017 and served as Party Secretary until April 2018.

Zelaya served as Consul General of Honduras in New York in 2018.
