= Jorge Cálix =

Honduran politician (born 1985)

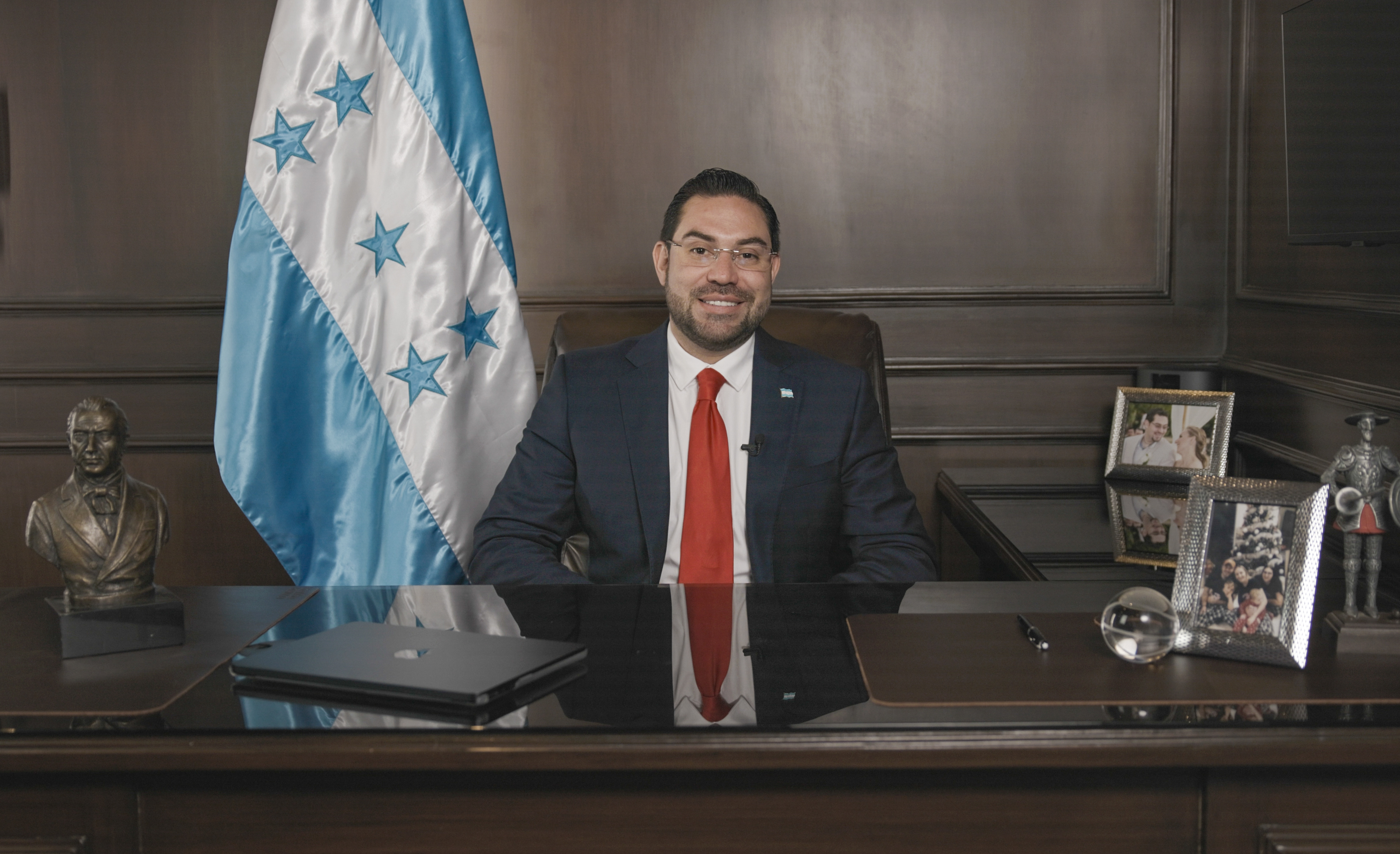
- Cálix in 2024

President of the National Congress
- Disputed
- In office 25 January 2022 – 7 February 2022; Disputed with Luis Redondo
- Preceded by: Mauricio Oliva
- Succeeded by: Luis Redondo

Personal details
- Born: 28 April 1985 (age 41)
- Party: Liberal Party

Jorge Luis Cálix Espinal (born 28 April 1985) is a Honduran politician serving as a member of the National Congress since 2014. From 2014 to 2018, he was a substitute member of the Congress. From January to February 2022, he was a disputed president of the Congress.
