= 2018 in Honduras =

- Decades: 1990s; 2000s; 2010s; 2020s
- See also: Other events of 2018; Timeline of Honduran history

Events in the year 2018 in Honduras.

== Incumbents ==
- President – Juan Orlando Hernández
- National congress president – Mauricio Oliva

== Events ==
- 9 January – 2018 Swan Islands earthquake, off the coast of Honduras

== Deaths ==
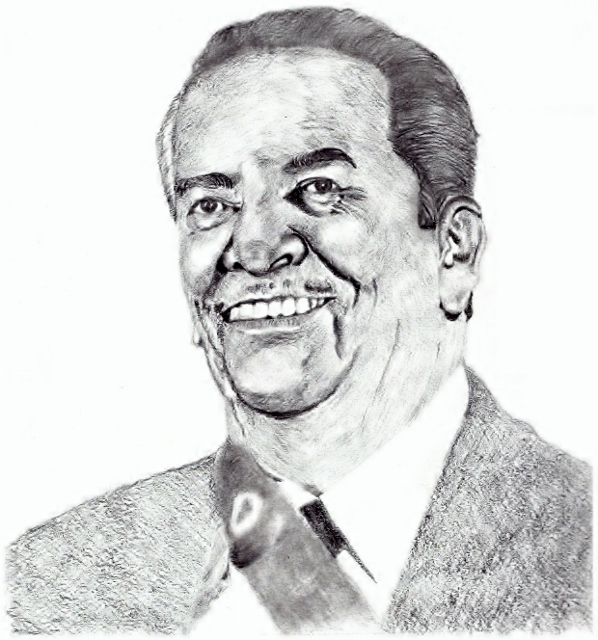
Roberto Suazo Córdova

- 8 January – Juan Carlos García, footballer (b. 1988).
- 17 June – William Chong Wong, economist and politician (b. 1950)
- 11 December – Walter Williams, footballer (b. 1983).
- 22 December – Roberto Suazo Córdova, politician, President of Honduras from 1982 until 1986 (b. 1927).
