= 2023 in Honduras =

- Decades: 2000s; 2010s; 2020s
- See also: Other events of 2023; Timeline of Honduran history

Events of 2023 in Honduras.

== Incumbents ==
- President: Xiomara Castro
- First Vice President: Salvador Nasralla
- Second Vice President: Doris Gutiérrez
- Third Vice President: Renato Florentino
- President of the National Congress: Luis Redondo

== Events ==
Ongoing – 2022–23 Honduran gang crackdown

- January 8 – President Xiomara Castro extends the state of emergency linked to the ongoing gang crackdown by 45 days.
- March 25 – Honduras switches its formal diplomatic recognition of "China" from the Republic of China to the People's Republic of China.
- June 20 – At least 41 women are killed in a riot at a women's prison in the town of Támara.
- June 24 to 25 – Thirteen people, 12 men, and 1 woman, were shot dead at a birthday party in the northern manufacturing city of Choloma. At least 11 others were killed in separate incidents across the northern de Sula region in what is assumed to be drug-related killings. Following the incident, the government imposed an immediate 15-day curfew in Choloma between 9 pm and 4 am and another in San Pedro Sula, effective 4th July.
- November 3 – The Government of Honduras recalls its ambassador to Israel as a response to Israel's military actions in the Gaza Strip.
- December 5 — 10 people were killed in a bus crash near Tegucigalpa. The government declared 3 days of mourning afterwards.

== See also ==
- COVID-19 pandemic in Honduras
- 2023 Atlantic hurricane season
- Public holidays in Honduras
