= 2012 in Honduras =

- Decades: 1990s; 2000s; 2010s; 2020s
- See also: Other events of 2012; Timeline of Honduran history

List of events in the year 2012 in Honduras.

== Incumbents ==
- President - Porfirio Lobo
- Congress President - Juan Orlando Hernández
- Supreme Court President - Jorge Alberto Rivera Avilés

== Events ==
- February 14: Comayagua prison fire: A fire inside the prison of Comayagua kills 364 inmates, is noted as the deadliest prison fire in history.
- February 18: A massive fire destroys three markets in the center of Tegucigalpa, nine persons injured.
- March 7: The Supreme Electoral Court inscribes Partido Anticorrupción as new political party.
- March 29: A unrest and fire inside the San Pedro Sula kills 13 inmates.
- May 15: The radio journalist Alfredo Villatoro is found dead in Tegucigalpa after being kidnapped 6 days before by six unknown people.
- July 31: The wife of the Finance Minister Hector Guillén is arrested in Tegucigalpa with one million Lempiras (about $50.000).
- November 18: Primary elections, Juan Orlando Hernández wins the candidature for National Party of Honduras and Mauricio Villeda wins in the Liberal Party of Honduras.
