= 2024 in Honduras =

- Decades: 2000s; 2010s; 2020s
- See also: Other events of 2024; Timeline of Honduran history

Events of 2024 in Honduras.

== Incumbents ==
- President: Xiomara Castro
- First Vice President: Salvador Nasralla
- Second Vice President: Doris Gutiérrez
- Third Vice President: Renato Florentino
- President of the National Congress: Luis Redondo

== Events ==
=== February ===
- 20 February – Former President Juan Orlando Hernández goes on trial in the United States on drug trafficking and weapons charges.
- 28 February – At least 17 people are killed after two buses collide in San Juan de Opoa, Copán.

=== March ===
- 8 March – Juan Orlando Hernández is found guilty of drug trafficking charges in a federal court in New York City.

=== June ===
- 15 June – President Xiomara Castro announces new measures to reduce gang activity, including building a 20,000-capacity "megaprison" of which similar to El Salvador's Terrorism Confinement Center (CECOT) and plans to designate gang members as terrorists which will be sent from the mainland to the island prison colony of Islas del Cisne during the crackdown on gangs.
- 26 June – Former President Juan Orlando Hernández is sentenced to 45 years in prison and fined $8 million for drug trafficking and firearms offences by a U.S. federal court.

=== August ===
- 1 August – Former National Police of Honduras commander Juan Carlos Bonilla Valladares is sentenced to 19 years in prison for drug trafficking by a U.S. federal court.
- 21 August – Honduras reports five suspected cases of the new mpox clade.
- 28 August – Honduras announces that it would end its extradition treaty with the United States that had been in place since 1912 following criticism by US ambassador Laura Dogu of a meeting between Honduran and Venezuelan officials.

=== September ===
- 14 September – Juan Lopez, an environmental activist who protested against open-pit iron ore mining in a forest reserve, is shot dead in Tocoa, Colón.
- 19 September – Two inmates are killed while three others are injured in an attempted jailbreak at a men's prison in Támara.

== Holidays ==
- 1 January – New Year's Day
- 28 –30 March – Holy Week
- 14 April – Americas Day
- 1 May – Labour Day
- 15 September – Independence Day
- 3 October – Francisco Morazán Birthday
- 12 October – Day of the Race
- 21 October – Army Day
- 25 December – Christmas Day
