= Honduras Activate =

Health initiative

Honduras Activate is a health initiative created by Juan Orlando Hernandez in order to promote physical activity and a healthy life style among the Honduran population. Honduras Activate aims to reduce significantly the amount of non-communicable chronic diseases (NCCD) such as hypertension, obesity, diabetes, among others. The program has gained both domestic and international recognition, with the PAHO and WHO praising the initiative and its goals.

== Introduction ==
With the number of obesity, hypertension and diabetes cases on the rise in Latin America, President Juan Orlando Hernandez decided to promote physical activity in Honduras through new parks and recreational spaces nationwide. The parks are equipped with soccer fields, basketball courts, running tracks and exercise machines.

== Honduras Activate events ==
In commemoration of World Health Day, President Hernandez launched a new phase for the Honduras Activate program that week. On Sunday April the 12th Hernandez and thousands of Honduras participated in 21.5 km hike in El Tigre (Honduras) Island. Honduras Activate events are now celebrated every Sunday in different National parks of the country. The event is marked by different activities to choose from. Activities include Hiking, Biking and different distance Marathons.

The Honduras Activate events have not only become popular for its health component, but its positive effect on domestic tourism. Every Sunday thousands of participants from all over the country participate in these events, which gives them the opportunity to visit different cities and national parks.

== International recognition ==
The WHO and PAHO have been very supportive of the Honduras Activate Program. Both organizations have shown interest to implement this program in other countries which also suffer from non-communicable chronic diseases. Moreover, Hernandez was invited to be the Keynote speaker at a joint WHO/PAHO conference in Washington DC in September 2015, where he disclosed the goals and benefits of the program. Due to the success of the program, both organizations named Hernandez “Health Champion 2015” since he was the first Latin American president to promote these types of activity.

== Highlights ==
- First Honduras Activate took place in El Tigre (Honduras) Island in April 2015.
- The first international event of Honduras Activity took place in Nicaragua in July 2015.
