= Hilda Hernández =

Honduran agronomist and politician

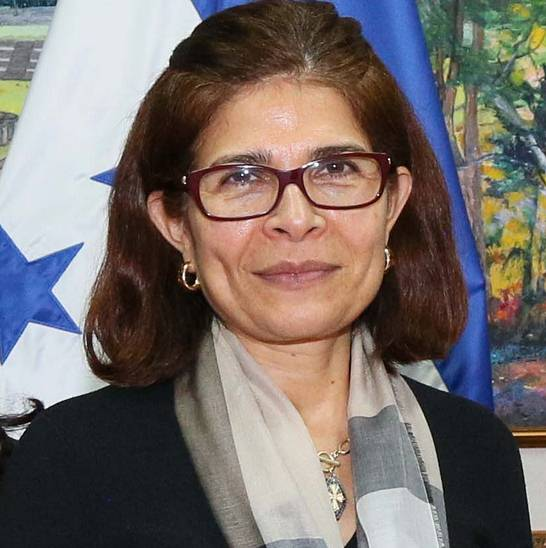
Hilda Hernández in 2016

Hilda Rosario Hernández Alvarado (5 October 1966 – 16 December 2017) was an agronomy engineer and Honduran politician. She held posts in the nationalist governments of Ricardo Maduro, Porfirio Lobo Sosa, and of her brother, Juan Orlando Hernández, who served as Honduran president between 2014 and 2022. From January 2017 until her death, she was a political advisor to her brother in his campaign for re-election in the Honduran general election of 2017.

== Biography ==
Hilda's parents were Juan Hernández Villanueva and Elvira Alvarado Castillo; she was sister of the former president of Honduras, Juan Orlando Hernández (2014-2022), and Juan Antonio Hernández. She graduated as an agronomy engineer from the Centro Universitario Regional del Litoral Atlántico, after attending the Escuela Agrícola Panamericana. During the government of Ricardo Maduro (2002–2006), Hilda headed the now-defunct Corporación Hondureña de Desarrollo Forestal (Cohdefor), and in the government of Porfirio Lobo Sosa (2010–2012) she was the minister for Social Development.

After the presidential victory of her brother Juan Orlando Hernández, Hilda was appointed Minister of Communications and Strategy on 22 July 2014, a controversial decision given the Constitution of Honduras prohibits (Article No. 250) family members of the President acting as Secretary of State.

Hilda Hernández died on 16 December 2017 in a helicopter accident while travelling to Soto Cano Air Base in Comayagua. Along with five others, she left Toncontín International Airport in Tegucigalpa, and was reported as missing after last contact was made at 09:47. Hours later, it was confirmed that the helicopter crashed in the Reserva Biológica Yerba Buena, 40 miles (64 km) north of Tegucigalpa. Some people like former army captain Santos Orellana doubted Hilda was aboard the helicopter.
