= Ana García Carías =

Former First Lady of Honduras

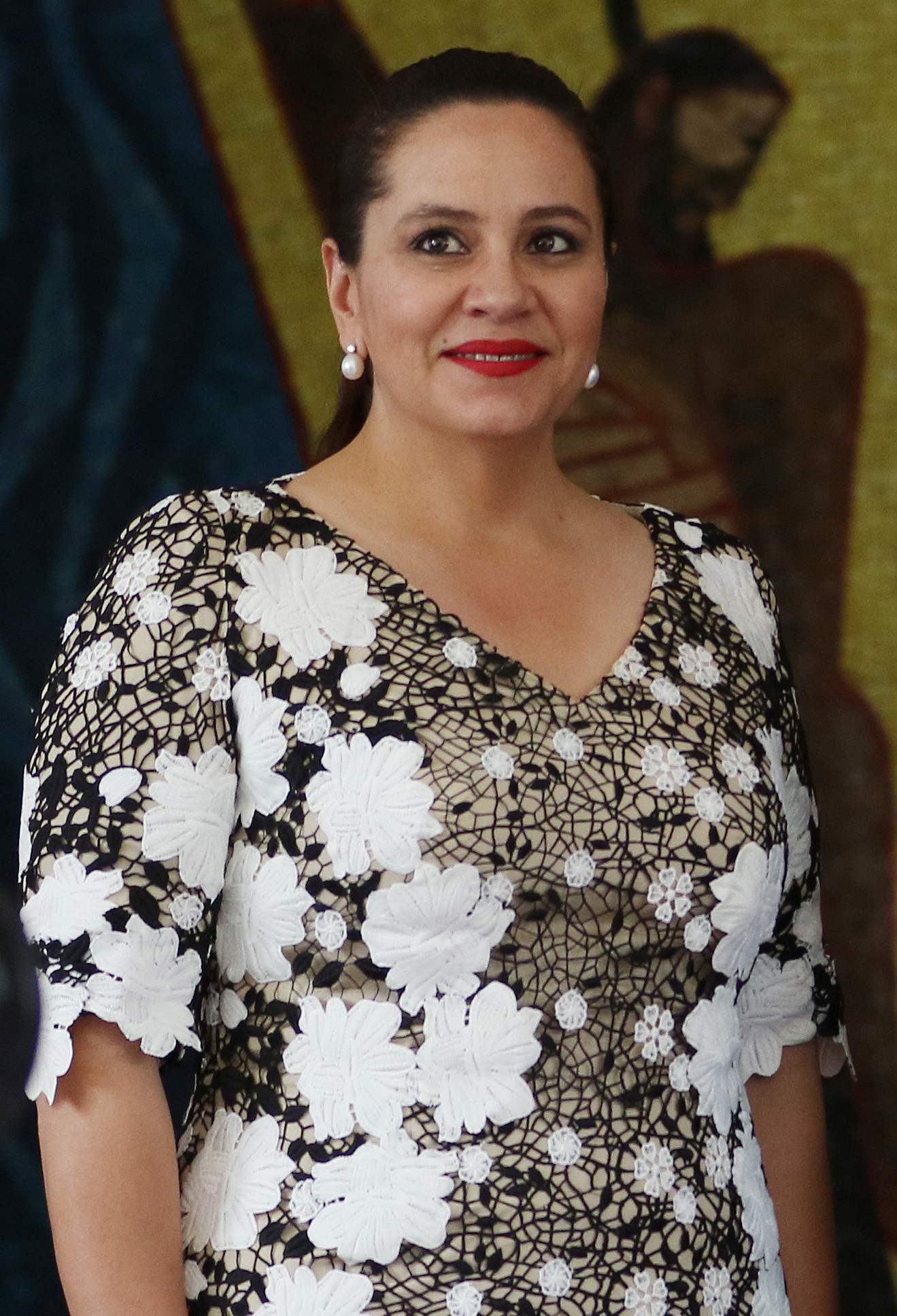

First Lady of Honduras
- In role 27 January 2014 – 27 January 2022
- President: Juan Orlando Hernández
- Preceded by: Rosa Elena Bonilla
- Succeeded by: Manuel Zelaya (as First Gentleman)

Personal details
- Born: Ana Rosalinda García Carías; 21 September 1968 (age 58) Tegucigalpa, Honduras
- Party: National Party of Honduras
- Spouse: Juan Orlando Hernández
- Children: 3
- Education: Universidad Nacional Autónoma de Honduras
- Occupation: Lawyer

Ana Rosalinda García Carías (born 21 September 1968) is a Honduran lawyer who was First Lady of Honduras from 2014 to 2022, as the wife of President Juan Orlando Hernández. She ran to be the National Party presidential nominee in the 2025 Honduran general election but was defeated by Nasry Asfura.

== Biography ==
Ana García Carías was born on 21 September 1968 in Tegucigalpa. She is the second daughter of the upper middle class marriage between José Guillermo García and Carlota Carías. During her childhood she lived in Juticalpa, Olancho – her father's birthplace – and then returned to Tegucigalpa.

At age 16 she graduated from the Sacred Heart Institute of Tegucigalpa. She studied at the Universidad Nacional Autónoma de Honduras, and graduated in 1991 with a degree in legal and social sciences with a focus in commercial law. She completed a postgraduate degree in public administration at the University of Albany in 1995. In 2002 she appeared before 15 magistrates to take her exam as a lawyer and notary, and was approved unanimously.

On 3 February 1990, she married Juan Orlando Hernández. This union has produced three children. Hernández has one daughter from a previous relationship.

García Carías is a descendant on the maternal side of General Tiburcio Carías Andino, who was president of Honduras for the National Party from 1932 to 1936, and then remained in power through a dictatorial regime from 1936 to 1949 with the backing of the United States.

== Political career ==
Ana García Carías became First Lady of Honduras on 27 January 2014, following her husband Juan Orlando Hernández's victory in the presidential election on 24 November 2013.

Following her husband's conviction for drug trafficking in the United States in 2024, Garcia announced that she would run for President of Honduras in the 2025 elections and seek a nomination from the National Party. In an interview with the Associated Press, she denied that her decision to run was an attempt to protect herself from prosecution, but that it was done to highlight the injustice done to her husband and an attempt to defend Honduras' image.

Honorary titles
Preceded by Rosa Elena Bonilla	First Lady of Honduras; 2014–2022	Succeeded by Manuel Zelaya (as First Gentleman)
