= Siomara Girón =

First Lady of Honduras (2009–2010)

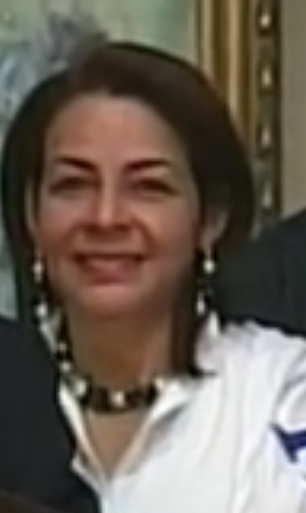

Acting First Lady of Honduras
- In role 28 June 2009 – 27 January 2010
- President: Roberto Micheletti
- Preceded by: Xiomara Castro
- Succeeded by: Rosa Elena de Lobo

Personal details
- Born: October 21, 1959 (age 66) El Progreso, Yoro, Honduras
- Party: Liberal Party of Honduras
- Spouse: Roberto Micheletti (m. 1993)
- Children: Roberto Carlos, Aldo Guillermo, Laura Donnatella
- Profession: Lawyer

Siomara Girón (born 21 October 1959) was the acting first lady of Honduras from June 28, 2009, to January 27, 2010.

== First lady following events of mid-2009 ==
The 2009 Honduran political crisis of June 28, 2009 propelled her husband Roberto Micheletti to the presidency of Honduras.

=== Family background ===
She married Roberto Micheletti on August 12, 1993, and they have three children.

== See also ==
- Roberto Micheletti#Family background
