= Leonor Bonilla =

Mexican actress

- Born: Leonor Bonilla Martínez; March 15, 1970 (age 56); Mexico City, Mexico
- Education: National Autonomous University of Mexico
- Occupation: Actress
- Years active: 1989–present
- Spouse: Ben Burton
- Children: 2
- Parents: Héctor Bonilla (father); Socorro Bonilla (mother)
- Relatives: Sergio Bonilla Martínez (brother); Fernando Bonilla Álvarez (half-brother); Mario Iván Martínez (cousin); Alma Delfina (aunt); Gonzalo Martínez Ortega (uncle) (deceased); Rosa Elena Bonilla (niece)

Leonor Bonilla (born Leonor Bonilla Martínez on March 15, 1970, in Mexico City, Mexico) is a Mexican actress. She is known for Rojo Amanecer, Mujer, casos de la vida real and Cicatrices.

== Biography ==
Bonilla was born on March 15, 1970, in Mexico City, Mexico. She is the daughter of actors Héctor Bonilla and Socorro Bonilla. she had a brother, Sergio Bonilla Martinez and a half-brother Fernando Bonilla Álvarez, from her father's next marriage. Bonilla is married to Ben Burton and has two children.

In 1989 debut in the film Rojo Amanecer as Student girl. In 1991 debut in telenovelas as Avelina in Madres egoístas produced by Juan Osorio. After an eight-year break, in 1999 she participated in Laberintos de pasión as Rebeca Fernández.

Next participation in 2001 in El manantial as Mirna and 2002 participated in television series Mujer, casos de la vida real. Bonilla in 2005 played Thelma in the film Cicatrices

== Filmography ==
Films, Telenovelas, Television
Year	Title	Role	Notes
1989	Rojo Amanecer	Student girl	Film
1991	Madres egoístas	Avelina	Recurring role
1999/00	Laberintos de pasión	Rebeca Fernández	Recurring role
2001/02	El manantial	Mirna Barraza	Recurring role
2002/06	Mujer, casos de la vida real		TV series
2005	Cicatrices	Thelma	Film
