= 2011 in Honduras =

- Decades: 1990s; 2000s; 2010s; 2020s
- See also: Other events of 2011; Timeline of Honduran history

List of events in the year 2011 in Honduras.

== Incumbents ==
- President – Porfirio Lobo
- National congress president – Juan Orlando Hernández
- Supreme Court president – Jorge Alberto Rivera Avilés

== Events ==
- February 3: At least 18 people died after a bus accident near Tegucigalpa.
- February 14: Central American Airways Flight 731 crashes outside Tegucigalpa, all the 14 passengers and crew are killed.
- March 8: General teacher's strike during five weeks. The government declared it as "illegal".
- April 9: Honduran president Porfirio Lobo, Colombian president Juan Manuel Santos and Venezuelan president Hugo Chavez met in Cartagena de Indias to accord the return of ousted Honduran president Manuel Zelaya.
- May 28: Ousted and exiled ex-president Manuel Zelaya returns to Honduras after the meeting of Honduras', Colombia's and Venezuela's presidents.
- August 2: Second major teacher's strike.
- August 20: Tropical Storm Harvey passes near Atlantic's coast.
- September 15: Honduras' independence day celebrations.
- October 20: Heavy storms and floods causes at least 50 deaths in the south of Honduras, specially in the Choluteca Department.
