= Pablo José Cámbar =

Honduran academic (1943–2021)

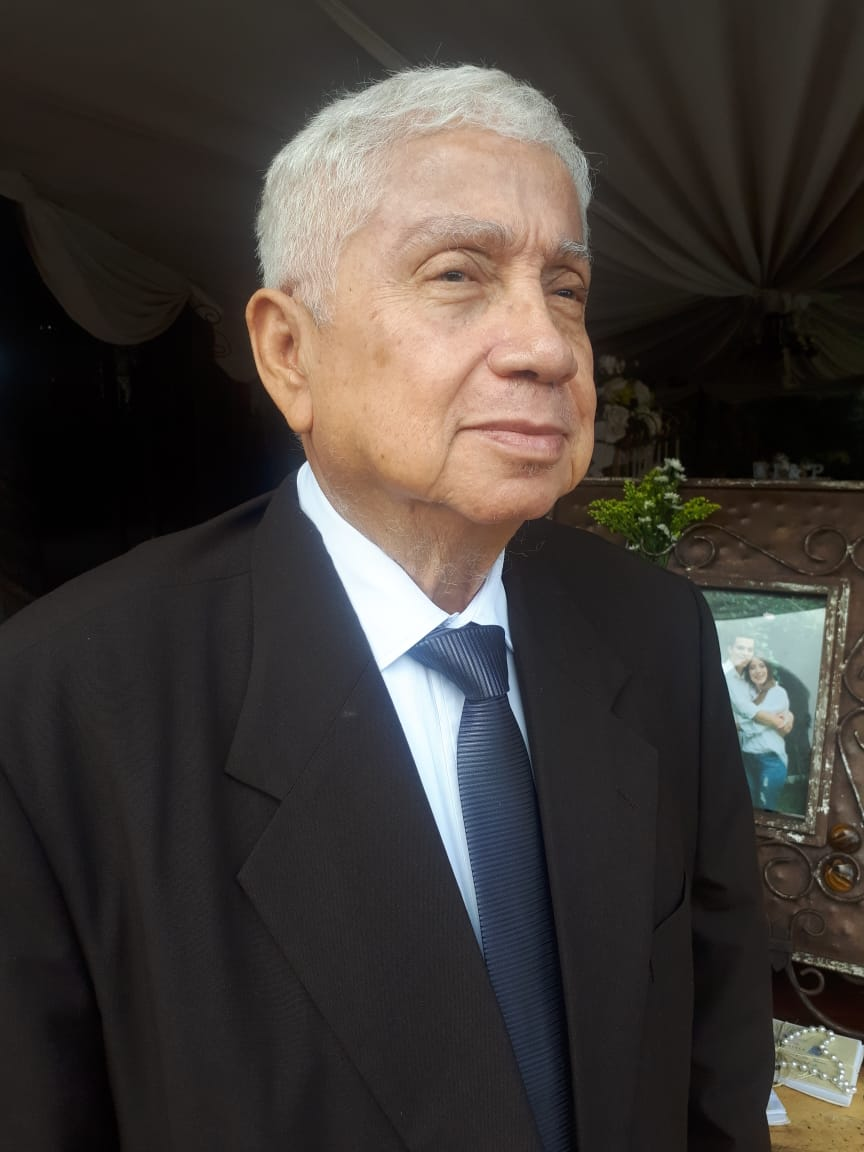
Pablo José Cámbar

Pablo José Cámbar (Tegucigalpa, 22 March 1943 – Tegucigalpa, 25 April 2021) was a Honduran academic, researcher, and physician. He died due to complications of COVID-19.
