= Rosa Elena Bonilla =

Former First Lady of Honduras

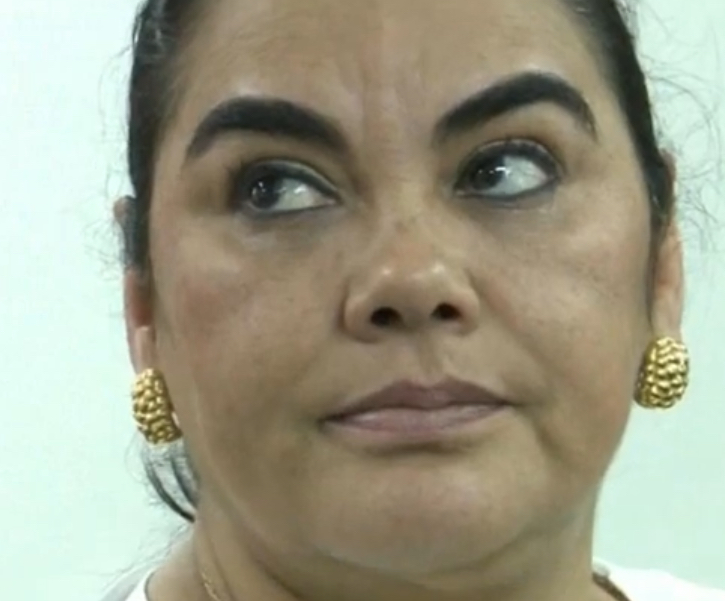

First Lady of Honduras
- In role 27 January 2010 – 27 January 2014
- President: Porfirio Lobo
- Preceded by: Siomara Girón
- Succeeded by: Ana García Carías

Personal details
- Born: 2 February 1967 (age 59) Tegucigalpa, Francisco Morazán, Honduras
- Party: National Party of Honduras
- Spouse: Porfirio Lobo
- Children: Ámbar, Saíd, Rosa Elena, and Luis
- Relatives: Leonor Bonilla (aunt); Sergio Bonilla (uncle); Fernando Bonilla Álvarez (uncle)

Rosa Elena Bonilla Ávila, also known as Rosa Elena de Lobo (born 2 February 1967), a Honduran politician and interior designer, is the wife of the 54th president of Honduras, Porfirio Lobo and former First Lady of Honduras.

== Biography ==
Rosa was born on 2 February 1967 in Tegucigalpa, Honduras to Fernando Bonilla Martínez and Maria Elena Avila. She spent her childhood in El Basque neighborhood and studied at "Escuela 14 de julio". She graduated in interior designing from "Instituto Alfa" in Tegucigalpa in 1987.

In early 1990s Rosa served as secretary in the office of Porfirio Lobo, who was then the director of the Honduran Forest Development Corporation (COHDEFOR). Porfirio and Rosa got married in 1992 and have four children Amber, Said, Rosa Elena, and Luis Fernando.

== Criminal charges ==
On the morning of 28 February 2018, Rosa Elena was arrested at her home in the El Chimbo sector of Tegucigalpa under accusations of corruption, which were the result of an investigation between the Public Prosecutor's Office and the Mission of Support against Corruption and Impunity in Honduras (Maccih), which called this case "the lady's petty cash". On that day Rosa Elena was placed under judicial arrest and sent to the Penitentiary for Women's Adaptation in Camara.6 In August, pre-trial detention was ratified for those involved in the case.

According to the accusation, Bonilla was part of a money-laundering network that appropriated some 16 million lempiras, which were state funds earmarked for social works. On 22 January 2014 (five days before the end of her term as First Lady) Rosa allegedly opened a personal account to transfer 12 million lempiras (about US$500,000) from the official account of the Office of the First Lady. Her brother-in-law, Mauricio Mora, and her former private secretary, Saúl Escobar, were also implicated in the case.

On 20 August 2019, Bonilla was found guilty of three counts of misappropriation and eight counts of fraud, and was acquitted of the crimes of money laundering and embezzlement of public funds. On 4 September, she was sentenced to 58 years in prison: 10 years for the charges of misappropriation and 6 years for each charge of fraud, in addition to a fine of 1.2 million lempiras - 10% of the appropriated value - and the confiscation of property and the total value of the fraud. Saúl Escobar was sentenced to 48 years in prison and Mauricio Mora was acquitted of all charges of insufficient evidence.

In March 2020, the Supreme Court of Honduras overturned Bonilla's conviction and ordered a new trial. During that time she appealed her case and Bonilla tried to assume her innocence, but the trial that was set for March 17, 2022. The date of the trial on March 17, 2022, the Supreme Court of Honduras found her guilty on one count of continuous fraud and misappropriation as an author. On September 20, 2022, a Honduran court sentenced Rosa Bonilla to 14 years in prison on charges of fraud and misappropriation of funds destined for social programs. She spent some 12.2 million lempiras (then worth around $590,000) meant for low-income children on personal credit card payments, her children's school fees and real estate construction, according to the public ministry.

== Personal life ==
Bonilla's son Saíd Omar Lobo Bonilla was shot dead on 14 July 2022. She was granted a brief leave from prison to attend his funeral.

Honorary titles
Preceded by Siomara Girón	First Lady of Honduras; 2010–2014	Succeeded by Ana García Carías
