= Honduran diaspora =

The Honduran Flag is a symbol of the Honduran diaspora.

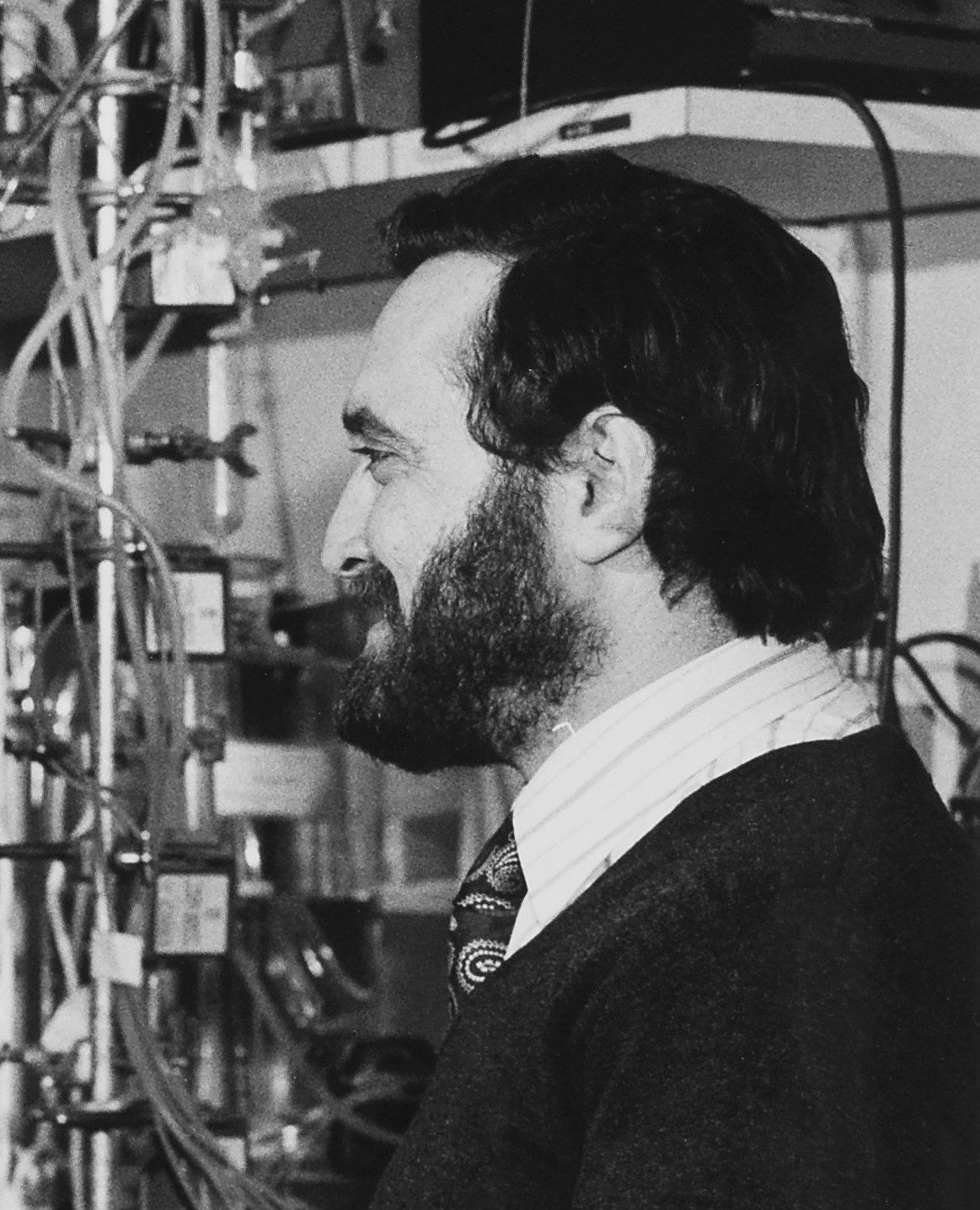
Salvador Moncada. A famous Honduran in the United Kingdom

Since 1975 emigration from Honduras has accelerated as economic migrants and political refugees seek a better life elsewhere. Although many Hondurans have many relatives in Nicaragua, Spain, Mexico, El Salvador and Canada, the majority of Hondurans living abroad are in the United States.

Nowadays, most Hondurans migrate because of the political persecution, unemployment, and poverty that has affected the country since the 1990s. However, many Hondurans have succeeded abroad; examples include Steve Van Buren, Sir. Salvador Moncada, Henry Flores, and Gerald Young.

== Countries ==
=== The United States ===
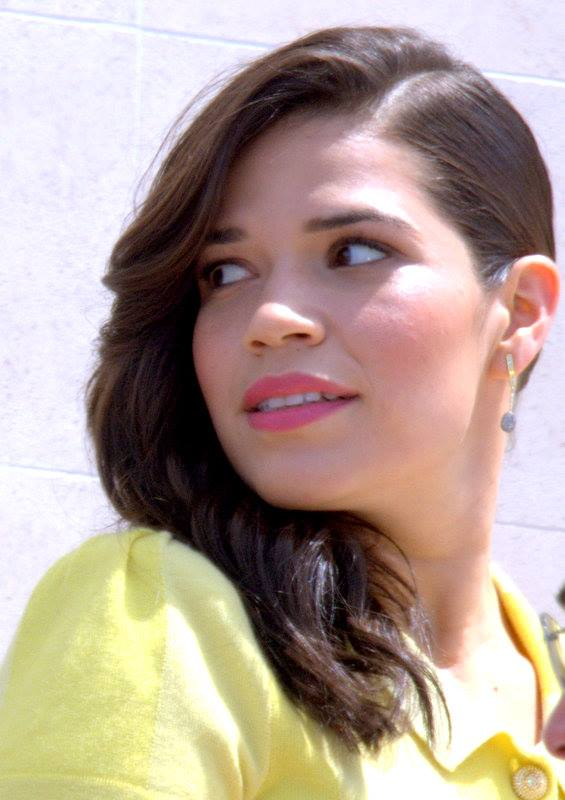
America Ferrera. American actress of Honduran descent.

According to the U.S. Census Bureau (figures taken from the 2015 American Community Survey), 1,084,000 Hondurans live in the USA, making them the third largest Central American community in the U.S. The top Metropolitan statistical areas for the Honduran community are:

Rank	Metropolitan statistical area	Hondurans - Estimated
1	New York-Newark-Jersey City, NY-NJ-PA MSA	114,769
2	Miami-Fort Lauderdale-West Palm Beach, FL MSA	89,163
3	Houston-The Woodlands-Sugar Land, TX MSA	66,756
4	Los Angeles-Long Beach-Anaheim, CA MSA	54,273
5	Washington-Arlington-Alexandria, DC-VA-MD-WV MSA	46,363
6	New Orleans-Metairie, LA MSA	28,842
7	Dallas-Fort Worth-Arlington, TX MSA	25,420
8	Atlanta-Sandy Springs-Alpharetta, GA MSA	19,836
9	Charlotte-Concord-Gastonia, NC-SC MSA	15,316
10	Boston-Cambridge-Newton, MA-NH MSA	15,194
11	Chicago-Naperville-Elgin, IL-IN-WI MSA	14,007
12	Baltimore-Columbia-Towson, MD MSA	10,246
13	Austin-Round Rock, TX MSA	9,304
14	San Francisco-Oakland-Berkeley, CA MSA	9,000
15	Riverside-San Bernardino-Ontario, CA MSA	8,975

2012 US State Department estimates suggested there are between 800,000 and 1 million Hondurans living in the United States, nearly 15% of the Honduran domestic population. The large uncertainty is due to the substantial number of Hondurans living illegally in the United States. The 2010 U.S. Census counted 633,401 Hondurans in the United States, up from 217,569 in 2000.

=== Spain ===
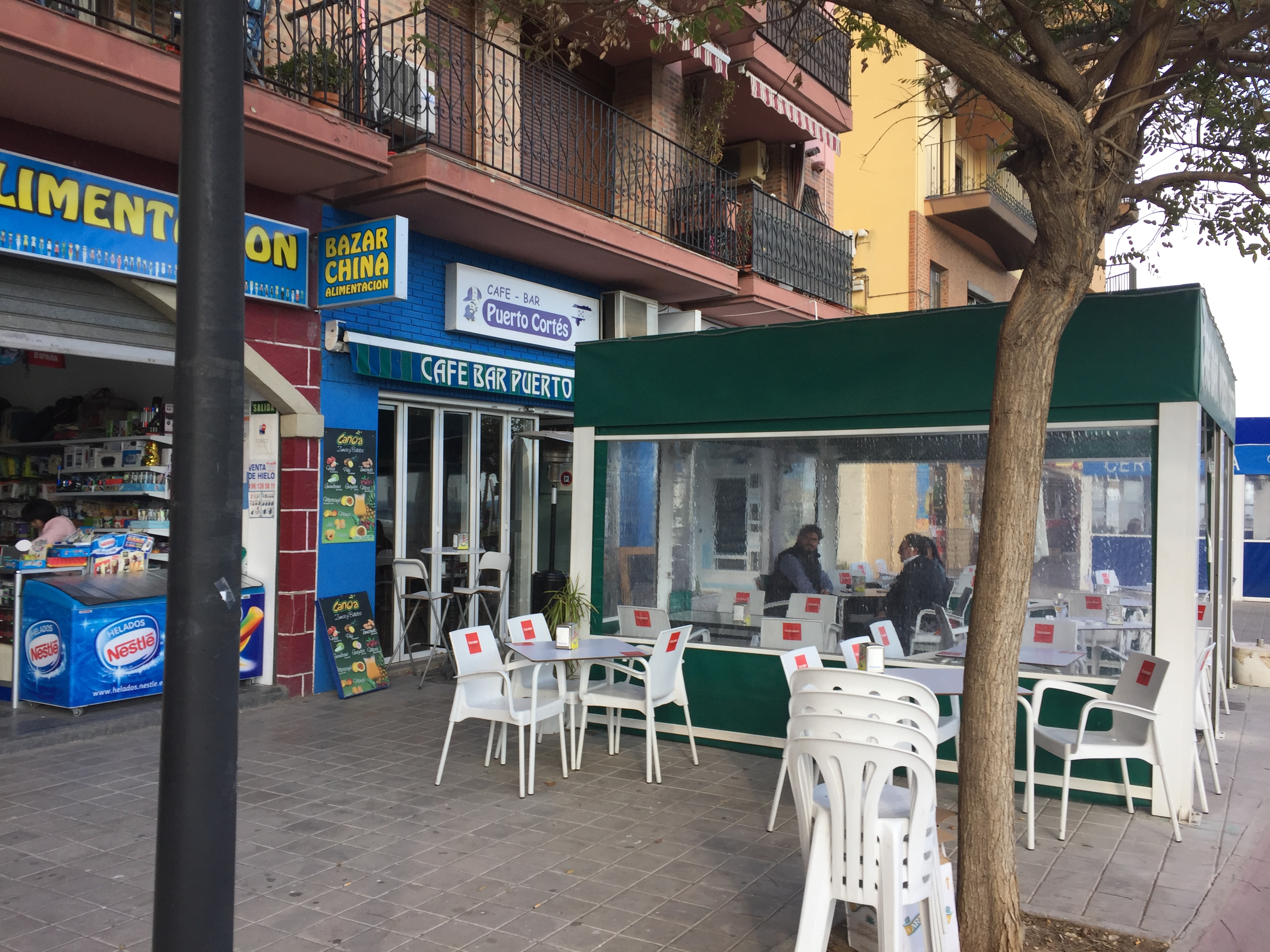
Honduran bar in Madrid, Spain.

On October 3, 1963, the then President of Honduras Dr. Ramón Villeda Morales and his wife Alejandrina Bermúdez Milla, visited Spain on the occasion of the change of Honduran Ambassador, Antonio Bermúdez for Virgilio Zelaya Rubí; Villeda Morales also met with Hondurans residing in the European nation, among them were: Harold Aldana, Jorge Rápalo, Luis Alberto Ponce, Óscar Ziri Zúñiga, Rubén Villeda.

On March 14, 1966, the Resolution on the Hispanic-Honduran Cultural Agreement2 is issued in which the Cultural Treaty between Hispano-Honduran dated October 22, 1958 is discussed and in which the citizens of both countries are exonerated from the payment of enrollment, exams and degrees when they enroll in educational centers in a country other than their own.

There were 100,000 Hondurans living in Spain in 2018.

=== The Americas ===
According to statistics compiled by CELADE (Investigación Migración Internacional de Latinoamérica) in 1992 there were more than 8,700 Hondurans living in El Salvador, 9,700 in Nicaragua (by 1995), 5,500 in Guatemala (by 2002), 3,000 in Costa Rica (by 2000); and 2,400 in Belize (by 1990). Additionally, according to the UN Demographic Yearbook (2000) 8,700 Hondurans live in Canada. There's another population of 80,587 in Mexico (by 2018).

== See also ==
- Honduras
- Demographics of Honduras
