= Honduran Social Security Institute =

Government agency

The Honduran Social Security Institute (Instituto Hondureño de Seguro Social or IHSS in Spanish) is a Honduran program that provides pensions and healthcare coverage. It was inaugurated in 1959 when the "Social Security Law of Honduras" was approved during the constitutional presidency of Ramón Villeda Morales. Honduran Institute assistance centers were created and formal operations began on March 1, 1962.

During the administration of Porfirio Lobo, Mario Zelaya was appointed as director of the Honduran Institute of Social Security. Mario Zelaya, took advantage of his position and the finances he handled to allegedly embezzle the institution of 325 million Lempiras (US$13.8 million) using a network of front men, including the former deputy minister of health, Javier Pastor and the former deputy minister of labor, Carlos Montes. An alleged result of this fraud was the unnecessary death of almost 3,000 people.
