= Tony Hernández =

Honduran politician (born 1978)

Member of the National Congress of Honduras
- In office 25 January 2014 – 23 November 2018
- President: Juan Orlando Hernández
- Constituency: Lempira Department

Personal details
- Born: 13 June 1978 (age 48) Lempira department, Honduras
- Party: National Party of Honduras
- Children: 3
- Education: National Autonomous University of Honduras
- Occupation: politician, drug trafficker
- Criminal information
- Allegiance: Sinaloa Cartel
- Convictions: Drug and arms trafficking (3 counts)
- Penalty: Life imprisonment in federal prison

Details
- Country: Honduras; United States
- Date apprehended: 23 November 2018

Juan Antonio Hernández Alvarado, known as Tony Hernández (born June 13, 1978), is a Honduran convicted drug trafficker, lawyer, politician, member of the National Party of Honduras and former deputy in the National Congress of Honduras (2014–2018) representing Lempira. He is the brother of Juan Orlando Hernández, the former President of Honduras. On November 23, 2018, Juan Antonio Hernández was arrested in Miami on drug trafficking charges. On November 26, 2018, he was formally charged in a federal court with importing tons of cocaine into the United States between 2004 and 2016, as well as on weapons charges.

On October 18, 2019, he was found guilty of drug trafficking charges. Hernández used the millions of dollars he earned through the drug trade and bribes to help fund the National Party of Honduras, led by his brother. This included a million-dollar bribe from former Sinaloa Cartel leader Joaquín "El Chapo" Guzmán. Despite his brother pledging to cooperate with US counter-narcotic operations in return for economic aid to Honduras, Hernández was also found to have alerted drug traffickers about US-led night raids. Hernández was accused of ordering the assassinations of multiple people, including former business partner Nery López Sanabria after he was convicted. In addition, he also arranged the murders of López Sanabria's lawyer as well as the warden of the prison that housed López Sanabria.

On March 30, 2021, Hernández was sentenced to life in prison by U.S. District Judge P. Kevin Castel. His brother (former Honduran President Juan Orlando Hernández) was also convicted March 8, 2024 in New York of charges that he conspired with drug traffickers and used his military and national police force to facilitate the transportation of tons of cocaine into the United States. He was however pardoned by President Donald Trump on December 1, 2025.

== Family life ==
His parents are Juan Hernández Villanueva and Elvira Alvarado Castillo. He is married to Miriam Vanessa Cruz Sierra. He has 16 older siblings, including Juan Orlando Hernández and Hilda Hernández (1966–2017).
