= Public holidays in Honduras =

Public holidays in Honduras are primarily centered on Christianity and the commemoration of significant events in Honduran history. Each celebration is very important to many families across this country. They are often celebrated with extended family members and friends. On a few of the most important holidays, such as Independence Day and holy week, parades and processions are held from early morning to late in the afternoon or evening.

== Public holidays ==
Date	English name	Spanish name	Comments
January 1	New Year's Day	Año Nuevo	
April 14	Americas Day	Día de la Americas	Commemorates the establishment of the International Union of American Republics at the First International Conference of American States, held in 1890.
March–April	Holy Week (Especially Maundy Thursday, Good Friday and Holy Saturday)	Semana Santa (Jueves Santo, Viernes Santo, Sábado Santo)	
May 1	Labour Day	Día de Trabajo	International Workers' Day
September 15	Independence Day	Día de la Independencia	Act of Independence of Central America, 1821
October 3 (celebration may vary)	Francisco Morazán's Day/Soldier's Day	Día del Soldado	Morazán was president of the Federal Republic of Central America, 1830–1839.
October 12	Discovery of America Day	Día del Descubrimiento de América	
October 21	Army Day	Día de las Fuerzas Armadas	In 1956, the army supported the people against dictator Julio Lozano Díaz.
December 25	Christmas Day	Navidad	

=== Non-obligatory ===
Date	English name	Spanish name	Comments
February 3	Virgin of Suyapa's Day	Nuestra Señora de Suyapa	Our Lady of Suyapa is the Patroness of Honduras.
March 19	Father's Day	Día del Padre	Coincides with Saint Joseph's Day
April 19	Spanish Language Day	Día del Idioma Español	Honors the Spanish language and culture; coincides with the death of Miguel de Cervantes
Second Sunday of May	Mother's Day	Día de la Madre	
June 11	Student's Day	Día del Estudiante	
July 20	Lempira Day	Día de Lempira	Dedicated to a leader of the Lenca people who led the resistance against the Spanish conquistadors in the 1530s.
September 1	National Flag Day	Día de la Bandera	
September 10	Children's Day	Día del Niño	
September 17	Teacher's Day	Día del Maestro	
December 24	Christmas Eve	Noche Buena	
December 31	New Year's Eve	Vispera de Año Nuevo	
