= COVID-19 pandemic in Honduras =

- Disease: COVID-19
- Pathogen: SARS-CoV-2
- Location: Honduras
- First outbreak: Wuhan, Hubei, China
- Index case: Toncontín International Airport, Tegucigalpa, Francisco Morazan; Ramón Villeda Morales International Airport, San Pedro Sula, Cortes
- Arrival date: 10 March 2020 (6 years, 5 months, 1 week and 5 days)
- Confirmed cases: 473,076
- Recovered: 462,812 (updated 31 July 2023)
- Deaths: 11,114
- Fatality rate: 2.35%
- Vaccinations: 6,596,213 (total vaccinated); 5,853,689 (fully vaccinated); 17,074,860 (doses administered)

Government website
- Estadística Nacional de Coronavirus

The COVID-19 pandemic in Honduras was a part of the worldwide pandemic of coronavirus disease 2019 (COVID-19) caused by severe acute respiratory syndrome coronavirus 2 (SARS-CoV-2). The virus was first confirmed to have spread to Honduras on 10 March 2020, when two women tested positive for the virus after one of them landed on Toncontín International Airport in a flight from Madrid, Spain, and the other on Ramón Villeda Morales International Airport in a flight from Geneva, Switzerland. Confirmed cases have been reported in all 18 departments of the country, with the majority of cases located in Cortés and Francisco Morazán.

Since the first cases were recorded in March, the country has implemented various measures to address the pandemic, including closing maritime, aerial, and land borders, suspending classes at all levels of education nationwide, ordering a nationwide curfew, and freezing prices for basic food items and certain medical supplies and equipment.

== Background ==
On 12 January 2020, the World Health Organization (WHO) confirmed that a novel coronavirus was the cause of a respiratory illness in a cluster of people in Wuhan City, Hubei Province, China, which was reported to the WHO on 31 December 2019.

The case fatality ratio for COVID-19 has been much lower than SARS of 2003, but the transmission has been significantly greater, with a significant total death toll.

== Timeline ==
Cases

Deaths

=== March 2020 ===
On 10 March, the first two cases in Honduras were confirmed. The first case is of a pregnant woman who traveled to Spain and returned to Honduras on 4 March, the woman is hospitalized. The second case is of a 37-year-old Honduran woman who entered on 5 March, on a flight from Switzerland, she is in self-isolation at her home with medical surveillance. That patient is the first case in the Atlántida Department in the municipality of El Porvenir.

On 13 March, a relative of the first patient was confirmed to have the virus, he is 64 years old and the second case in the capital of the country, Tegucigalpa in the Francisco Morazan department.

On 15 March, three more cases were confirmed in the country, two in Tegucigalpa and the first in the Choluteca department for a total of 6 cases. Honduras also closed all of its air, land and maritime borders to contain the virus.

On 16 March, Honduras confirmed two more cases of coronavirus in the City of Tegucigalpa, raising the confirmed cases to eight. At the same time, with the country in voluntary quarantine, further measures were taken, banning use of public transport and forcing some public and private labor to work from home where possible and abstain from presenting themselves to work. Additionally, stronger measures were taken in the Central District, Choluteca, and La Ceiba, where a total curfew is currently imposed and all nonessential movements of people are banned until further notice, including those in and out of those cities.

On the morning of 17 March, an epidemiological fence was set in the neighborhoods of El Carrizal and Abraham Lincoln in the Central District, as an individual that had tested positive was among those in a neighborhood gathering. The first case in San Pedro Sula was confirmed on that afternoon, totaling nine confirmed cases nationwide. It has been reported that the patient had previous contact with nine other individuals, they have been placed under medical observation and self-quarantine, the total curfew has been extended to San Pedro Sula, now covering four cities. The Health Secretary has reported 35 suspicious cases in Tegucigalpa.

On 18 March, three new cases where confirmed, one in Francisco Morazan, one in Cortes, and one in Choluteca. Raising the number of confirmed nationwide cases to twelve. Additionally, it was announced by the Government that on the cities placed under total curfew, 19 March has been designated as the designated day for citizens to gather or purchase their supplies, and to avoid price inflation, price freezes for designated foods and all personal and household hygiene products.

On 19 March, twelve new cases were confirmed, raising the number of confirmed cases nationwide to 24. Additionally, 90 suspected cases have been reported. The total curfew was extended to the cities of Puerto Cortés, Santa Cruz de Yojoa, and El Triunfo since new cases were reported on these locations, the curfew now extends to a total of seven cities nationwide.

On 20 March, the government has announced no new cases for the coronavirus after 27 lab tests. Additionally, the total curfew has been extended to the rest of the country, placing Honduras into a lockdown in efforts to contain the spread of the virus.

On 21 March, two new cases were announced, these were confirmed in the municipality of Villanueva in the Cortés Department.

On 22 March, a new case was confirmed in the municipality of Santa Fe in the Colon Department, totaling 27 nationwide.

On 23 March, three new cases were confirmed, one in the Lempira Department and two in the Francisco Morazan Department.

On 24 March, five new cases were confirmed in the Colon Department and one in the Cortes Department, totaling to 36 cases nationwide.

On 25 March, 16 new cases were confirmed, 14 of them in the Cortes department and 2 of them in the Yoro Department increasing the confirmed cases in the country to 52. Presently, this marks the largest increase up to date.

On 26 March, the first death was confirmed, a 60-year patient in Villanueva, in the Cortes Department. During the evening, 16 new cases were confirmed, all in the Central District.

On 27 March, 27 new cases were confirmed, 1 in the Yoro Department, 2 in the Lempira Department, 6 in the Colon Department, and 18 in the Cortes Department. Additionally, 29 suspected cases were announced. Later that evening, the health minister confirmed that 3 patients have recovered, 1 in San Pedro Sula, 1 in El Porvenir, and 1 in Tegucigalpa.

On 28 March, two more deaths by Coronavirus were confirmed in Villanueva, Cortes. Later during the day, it was clarified by the government that "Patient #85" was actually in Quimistan, in the Department of Santa Barbara and not in Santa Cruz de Yojoa in the Department of Cortes, meaning that at least 8 departments in the country have reported cases. Also that same day, 15 new cases were reported in the country.

On 29 March, it was announced by the Secretary for Security that the nationwide curfew will be extended until 12 April. Later that day, 29 new cases were confirmed in the country, for a total of 139 cases nationwide. Additionally, the third death was officially confirmed by the Virology Institute of the country. Three deaths will be confirmed the next day if it was caused by COVID-19. Cortes has now 79 cases, the most of any department in the country.

On 30 March, one death was confirmed to be from COVID-19. A couple hours later to that announcement, 3 more deaths were reported in the Cortes Department. Totaling to four confirmed deaths and seven nationwide. During that day's evening, two more cases of Coronavirus were confirmed after the Virology Institute made a total of 89 tests.

On 31 March, two deaths were confirmed from COVID-19, one in the City of Tegucigalpa and one in La Union, in the Lempira Department. During the evening, 31 new cases were confirmed, 22 from the Cortes, 4 from Colon, 2 from Francisco Morazan, 2 from Atlantida, and 1 from Lempira. One death from COVID-19 was reported from the Atlantida Department, taking the death count to 10.

=== April 2020 ===
On 1 April, the Honduran Health Minister, Alba Flores, and a representative from the Pan American Health Organization, Piedad Huerta, have been quarantined for 12 days after becoming suspicious cases for COVID-19, as they were in contact with an assistant that tested positive for the virus. During the evening, 4 deaths were confirmed, two in Cortes and two in Yoro, alongside 47 new cases for COVID-19, with the 1 April update they are now 140 cases in Cortes, 43 in Francisco Morazan, 21 in Colon, 4 in Lempira, 4 in Santa Barbara, 3 in Atlantida, 3 in Yoro and 2 in Choluteca.

On 2 April, three more cases were confirmed, alongside one death. Among the new cases, one was the first case in the La Paz Department, meaning that half of the country now has at least one confirmed COVID-19 case.

On 3 April, 42 new cases were confirmed, after performing 141 tests. 29 new cases were reported in Cortes, 7 in Atlantida, 4 in Santa Barbara, one in Yoro, and one in Francisco Morazan.

On 4 April, 4 new cases were confirmed, 2 in Francisco Morazan, 1 in Cortes, and the first one in the Comayagua Department. Additionally, 3 patients have recovered, and 7 have died, 6 in Cortes, and 1 in Colon.

On 5 April, 30 new cases were confirmed in the country, 25 in Cortes, 2 in Colon, 1 in Atlantida, 1 in Yoro, and the first one in the Copán Department.

On 6 April, 7 new cases were confirmed in the country, 6 in Francisco Morazan and 1 in Comayagua. Additionally, the government, via the Health Minister, has announced that the use of masks is now mandatory for anyone circulating in the country.

On 7 April, 7 new cases were confirmed in the country, 5 in Atlantida, 1 in Yoro, and 1 Francisco Morazan.

On 8 April, 31 new cases were confirmed, alongside 1 death, in Cortes. At the same time, the National Police announced that the curfew would continue until 19 April, alongside changes to the segmented circulation of the population, distributing it for five days instead of the initial three, in efforts to reduce the number of people circulating, maintaining the protocol utilizing the last digit of a person's ID card or passport in order to enter commercial establishments.

On 9 April, 39 new cases were confirmed, all of them in Cortes, alongside 1 recovery in Atlantida. As Cortes was badly affected, Honduran authorities pleaded for their citizens to stay at home at all costs, going so far as announcing distribution of masks to each home in Sula Valley. It was also announced, that COVID-19 tests would also be performed in La Ceiba, Atlantida, meaning the country will soon have three designated locations for lab tests.

On 10 April, 10 new cases were confirmed, being distributed in the following manner: 7 in Colon, 1 in La Paz, 1 in Santa Barbara, 1 in Francisco Morazan, another death was also announced in Atlantida. New guidelines were announced for Colon, Yoro, and Cortes, where circulation, as segmented with the last digit of the ID or passport, now limited to one digit per day, however, they were annul for some time but that night they were put again, due to the increase in cases for both those departments, which have a total curfew as previously ordered. The announcement by the National Police also pointed out the need for police forces to further enforce curfews in those departments and for the new dispositions to be followed in the rest of the country. Additionally, the government has ordered a price stabilization for face masks, antibacterial gel, and 95% ethyl alcohol, setting maximum prices for every item per its appropriate unit. Additionally, the Municipality of La Ceiba agreed to request the Central Government to apply the same methods currently enforced in San Pedro Sula and El Progreso, as to prevent further cases of COVID-19 in the city.

On 11 April, one new case was confirmed from Francisco Morazan and a death from COVID-19 in Yoro. That same day, 27 sailors who arrived on a charter flight from Brazil tested positive for COVID-19 in fast tests that were recently implemented and will be quarantined for 14 days, during that time, they will be retested to confirm the result.

On 12 April, 4 new cases were confirmed, 3 from Cortes and 1 from Colon.

on 13 April, 10 new cases were confirmed, 8 from Cortes, 1 from Lempira, and 1 from Francisco Moraza; a new death was confirmed to be from the virus and its complications. During the announcement, it was confirmed that over 2,500 tests have been performed and some minor doubts were cleared up in relation to how testing is currently working in the country. The spokesperson alluded to over 1,000 suspicious cases, explaining that tests performed with quick testing equipment have to be confirmed via laboratory tests.

On 14 April, 12 new cases were confirmed, 9 in Cortes, 2 in Atlantida, and 1 in Francisco Morazan; 5 people have died from the virus and its complications and 2 have recovered.

On 15 April, 7 new cases were confirmed, 4 in Cortes, 2 in Atlantida, and 1 in Yoro, alongside 4 more deaths due to the virus and its complications. The spokesperson, during the announcement, stressed the importance of increasing the tests count, which currently stands at 44, and confirmed that the government is seeking support from private laboratories across the country.

On 16 April, 16 new cases were confirmed, alongside 6 deaths, and one recovery, all in Cortes.

On 17 April, 15 new cases were confirmed, alongside 5 deaths, all in Cortes. The spokesperson also announced that private laboratories across the country are starting to perform tests for COVID-19, specially in Cortes, as to serve the Atlantic coast of the country.

On 18 April, 15 new cases were confirmed, 13 in Cortes, 1 in Francisco Morazan, and 1 in Santa Barbara; alongside 5 recoveries. 139 total tests were performed, and these are the first tests performed in conjunction with private laboratories in the country.

On 19 April, 5 new cases were confirmed, 2 in Cortes, 2 in Yoro, and 1 Colon; alongside 10 recoveries from the virus and its complications.

On 20 April, 17 new cases were confirmed, 16 in Cortes and 1 in Francisco Morazan; alongside 4 recoveries.

On 21 April, 16 new cases were confirmed, 14 in Cortes and 2 in Choluteca; alongside 1 recovery. In the departments of Colon, Cortes, and Yoro a new segmentation for circulation has been implemented, which will be effective until 1 May 2020.

On 22 April, 9 new cases were confirmed, 7 in Cortes and 1 in Francisco Morazan; alongside 1 recovery and 1 death.

On 23 April, 43 new cases were confirmed, most of them in Cortes; alongside 19 recoveries and various suspicious deaths from the virus and its complications. During that announcement, it was confirmed that San Pedro Sula performed their first tests in the region, increasing the amount of tests per day to 172. Valle Department also confirm its first case in the municipality of Aramecina, making Valle the twelfth department with a confirmed case.

On 24 April, 29 new cases were confirmed, 26 in Cortes, 2 in Yoro, and 1 in Choluteca. 8 people have recovered and the same number have died from the virus and its complications.

On 25 April, 36 new cases were confirmed, 32 in Cortes, 2 in Yoro, 1 in Atlantida, and 1 in Comayagua. 7 people have recovered and 4 have died.

On 26 April, 34 new cases were confirmed. 4 people have recovered and 2 have died. The curfew has been extended to 3 May 2020, following the already stablished circulation rules, the total curfew has been extended to the municipality of Las Vegas, Santa Barbara.

On 27 April, 41 new cases were confirmed, 16 in Cortes, 15 in Francisco Morazan, 6 in Yoro, 3 in Intibuca, and 1 in El Paraiso; 4 people have recovered and 3 have died. These are the first cases in Intibuca and El Paraiso.

On 28 April, 36 new cases were confirmed, 31 in Cortes, 2 in Intibuca, 1 in Atlantida, 1 in Francisco Morazan, and 1 in Yoro; alongside 2 new deaths.

On 29 April, 33 new cases were confirmed, 19 in Francisco Morazan, 4 in Yoro, 3 in Choluteca, 2 in Cortes, 2 in Colon, 2 in Intibuca, and 1 in Valle; alongside 6 recoveries and 5 deaths.

On 30 April, 33 new cases were confirmed, 18 in Cortes, 6 in Francisco Morazan, 6 in Atlantida, 2 in Colon, and 1 in Yoro; alongside 33 recoveries and 4 deaths. On this day, it was announced that the department of Cortes, the municipality of El Progreso Yoro, and the municipality of Las Vegas Santa Barbara would be entirely locked down in order to prevent uncontrollable spread of the virus.

=== May 2020 ===
On 1 May, 95 new cases were confirmed, 88 in Cortes and 7 from Francisco Morazan. Totaling to 899 cases in the country. No deaths or recoveries were announced.

On 2 May, 111 new cases were confirmed, 74 in Cortes, 22 in Francisco Morazan, 9 in Yoro, 2 in Comayagua, 1 in Choluteca, 1 in Valle, 1 in El Paraiso, and 1 in Lempira; alongside 1 death and 1 recovery.

On 3 May, 45 new cases were confirmed, 42 in Cortes, 2 in Francisco Morazan, and 1 in Comayagua. The limited circulation by the population has been revised once more, allowing for just one digit (of the ID or passport) per day, alongside an extension of the nationwide curfew to 17 May; such measures do not apply to El Progreso, Yoro; Las Vegas, Santa Barbara; and Cortes.

On 4 May, 123 new cases were confirmed, 81 in Cortes, 28 in Francisco Morazan, 4 in Yoro, 2 in Intibuca, 2 in Atlantida, 1 in El Paraiso, 1 in Choluteca, 1 in Comayagua, 1 in Valle, and the first case in the Olancho Department; alongside 1 death and 4 recoveries.

On 5 May, 92 new cases were confirmed, 50 in Francisco Morazan, 36 in Cortes, 4 in Valle, 1 in Santa Barbara, and 1 in Ocotepeque; alongside 10 deaths and no new recoveries.

On 6 May, 191 new cases were confirmed, 148 in Cortes, 27 in Francisco Morazan, 9 in Atlantida, 2 in Valle, and 5 in Yoro; alongside 6 deaths and 10 recoveries.

On 7 May, 224 new cases were confirmed, the highest single-day increase so far in the country; alongside 6 deaths and 22 recoveries.

On 8 May, 86 new cases were confirmed, most of them in the Cortes department; alongside 2 deaths and 38 recoveries.

On 9 May, 59 new cases were confirmed; most cases were reported in Cortes, there was a decrease in cases because fewer tests were done as private laboratories do not work on Saturday.

On 10 May, 142 cases were confirmed, with Cortes and Francisco Morazan having the majority of cases.

On 11 May, Sinager confirmed 128 new cases, 84 in Cortes, 21 in Francisco Morazan, 21 in Yoro, and 2 in Choluteca, 8 new deaths and 3 new recoveries were also reported.

On 12 May, a revision was made lowering the number of cases from 2,100 to 2,006, as mistakes were made from the IHSS as reports 60 and 61 have the same number of confirm cases and the same information. On the evening of the same day, 74 new cases were confirm, 42 from Cortes, 24 from Francisco Morazan, 4 in valle, 2 in Santa Barbara, 1 Comayagua, and 1 in Choluteca, 5 new deaths were also reported.

On 13 May, 175 new cases were confirmed, 145 in Cortes, 14 in Atlantida, 8 in Francisco Morazan, 4 in Santa Barbara, 2 in Yoro, 1 in Lempira and 1 in Choluteca, 2 new deaths and 26 recoveries were also reported.

On 21 May, 104 new cases were reported, 60 in Cortes, 22 in Atlantida, 16 in Francisco Morazan, 4 in Santa Barbara, 1 in Comayagua, and 1 in Santa Barbara, 5 new deaths and 42 new recoveries were also reported.

On 23 May, 266 new cases were confirmed, the majority of the cases were in Cortes. The Bay Islands reported their first case, becoming the seventeenth department to confirm COVID-19. 7 new deaths and 16 recoveries were also reported.

=== June 2020 ===
On 12 June, 463 new cases were reported: 219 in Cortes, 187 in Francisco Morazan, 14 in Valle, 14 in Atlantida, seven in Copan, six in Yoro, four in Santa Barbara, four in El Paraiso, four in Choluteca, two in La Paz, one in Olancho and one in Comayagua. 12 new deaths were also reported: eight in Francisco Morazan, three in Cortes and one in Choluteca, along with seven recoveries.

On 13 June, 323 new cases were confirmed along with four deaths and 50 new recoveries. Gracias a Dios department confirm its first case, making it the last department in the country to confirm COVID-19 cases.

On 16 June, 478 new cases were confirmed, the majority of them in Francisco Morazan. Eight new deaths were also reported. President Juan Orlando Hernandez and his wife tested positive for COVID-19.

=== 2021 ===
The Government of Honduras reported 144,007 confirmed cases of COVID-19 within its borders and 3,512 COVID-19 related deaths as of 28 January 2021. The government announced the continuation of the national curfew from 9:00 p.m. to 5:00 a.m. During the week, shopping and essential activities are allowed daily from 5:00 a.m. to 9:00 p.m. Businesses are only allowed to have 50% capacity.

78-year-old Cardinal Óscar Rodríguez Maradiaga was diagnosed with COVID-19 on 4 February 2021.

28-year-old nursing student Keyla Patricia Martínez was arrested in La Esperanza, Intibucá Department and was murdered by choking while in police custody. Her death was originally called a suicide, but following protests it was reclassified as homicide.

== Vaccination ==
The roll out of the vaccination against the virus is relatively slow in Honduras compared to other Central American countries. By October 2021, Honduras reports 5.76 M doses administered it represents 24.5% of its total population. While other countries in the region already vaccinated up to a quarter of their populations. Honduras is one of the recipients of vaccines distributed by the COVAX mechanism, which is a worldwide initiative that seeks equitable access to COVID-19 vaccines. By end of May 2021, Honduras has received 238,000 doses of the AstraZeneca/Oxford Vaccine and 253,832 doses have been administered nationwide. The total supply of vaccines covers 7.5% of the Honduran population. In contrast to other Latin American countries, Honduras, along with Guatemala, Nicaragua and Paraguay, has not received vaccine donations from China as a result of vaccine diplomacy. The reason for that is that these countries have diplomatic ties with Taiwan instead of China and recognize Taipei over Beijing. Indeed, the Honduran president Juan Orlando Hernández has expressed interest in opening a trade office for China in order to access more vaccines. While neighbouring country El Salvador has received thousands of doses of Chinese vaccines, the number of contracted doses in Honduras remains very low and most of them come through the COVAX mechanism. The need for vaccine supply remains urgent, which has led the Salvadorian President Nayib Bukele to donate 34,000 doses to seven towns in Honduras where the mayors have posted pleas for vaccines on social media.

== See also ==
- COVID-19 pandemic in North America
- COVID-19 pandemic by country and territory
- 2009 swine flu pandemic
- 2015–2016 Zika virus epidemic
- 2019–2020 dengue fever epidemic
- 2020 in Central America
