= Luis Redondo =

Honduran politician and engineer

Luis Rolando Redondo Guifarro
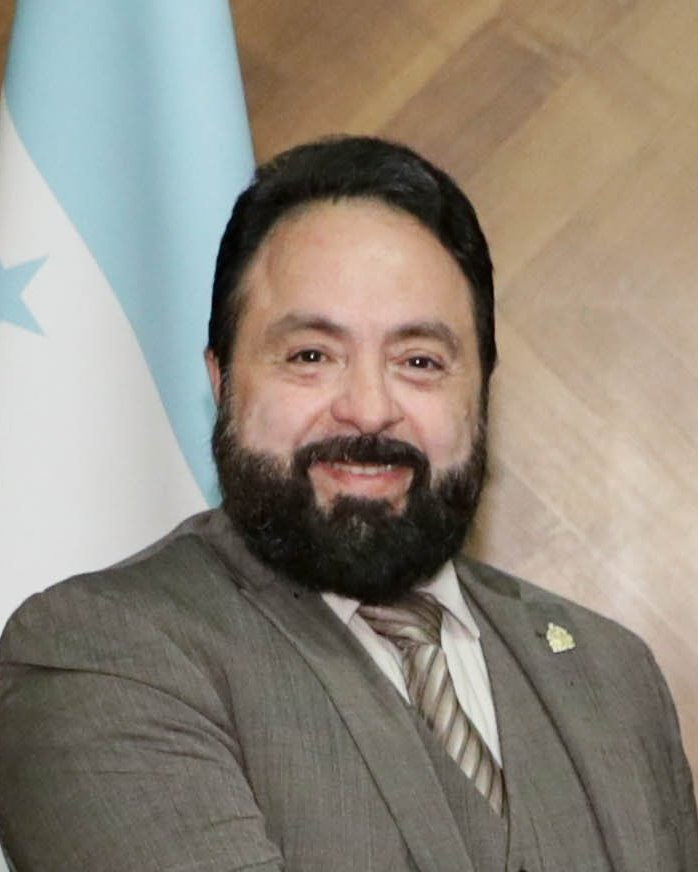
- Redondo in 2023

President of the National Congress of Honduras
- In office 25 January 2022 – 20 January 2026
- Preceded by: Mauricio Oliva
- Succeeded by: Tomás Zambrano

Deputy of the Cortés Department
- In office 25 January 2014 – 20 January 2026

Personal details
- Born: 20 March 1973 (age 53) Tegucigalpa, Honduras
- Party: Libre (2025–present)
- Other political affiliations: Anti-Corruption Party (2011–2017); PINU-SD (2017–2020); Savior (2020–2025)
- Education: National Autonomous University of Honduras (CoE)

Luis Rolando Redondo Guifarro (born 20 January 1973) is a Honduran politician and engineer who was a deputy and served as the disputed president of the National Congress of Honduras from 25 January 2022 until 20 January 2026.

== Early life and career ==
Redondo began as a businessman in San Pedro Sula. He got involved supporting the Honduras National Team, traveling everywhere they played, becoming head of the barra since 2004. In that same year he met Salvador Nasralla, with whom he began a friendship. He traveled to the 2010 and 2014 World Cups, along with the national team. In 2011, he supported Nasralla for the creation of the Anti-Corruption Party and, in turn, became a candidate for deputy to Congress, in the 2013 election, in which he was elected.

=== Partido Anticorrupcion ===
In 2016, a crisis began within the Anti-Corruption Party with Nasralla being accused of being "badly advised" which led to a dispute between Nasralla and Marlene Alvarenga about which of them would become the party's presidential candidate, the latter winning the dispute, while Nasralla would be appointed as the LIBRE-PINU presidential candidate. Redondo left PAC and joined PINU to run for Congress, being elected.

=== Congressional president ===
In October 2021, the presidential candidates for PSH and LIBRE, Salvador Nasralla and Xiomara Castro, respectively, struck an alliance. Part of the agreement for Nasralla to step down as a candidate and endorse Castro was that if they were able to gain a majority in Congress, the head of Congress would be a member of the Savior Party. Castro's party won 50 seats, whilst Nasralla's party won 10. On 23 December, during a livestream, Nasralla announced his endorsement for Luis Redondo to become the President of the Congress. The next morning, Castro followed suit.

When the newly elected congress voted for a congressional president on 21 January 2022, 18 deputies from LIBRE voted for Jorge Cálix, a member of LIBRE, rather than Redondo. As a consequence, the 18 deputies were expelled from LIBRE. On 8 February 2022 the dispute was resolved when Cálix agreed to renounce his claim to the Presidency of the Congress, allowing Redondo to lead the Congress. Cálix's and the expelled deputies' membership of LIBRE was subsequently restored by LIBRE's leader Manuel Zelaya.

On 1 November 2025 Redondo installed a temporary congressional body to assume legislative duties ahead of the 2025 general elections, provoking cries of an authoritarian takeover by opposition parties as it bypassed the congressional majority. On 9 January 2026 Gladis Aurora Lopez a lawmaker of the National Party was injured after an unidentified assailant threw what appeared to be an explosive device into an outdoor hallway in the legislature where members of the National Party were holding a news briefing ahead of the planned transition of power. Redondo who had refused to acknowledge the election results and lost his seat as lawmaker in the elections, was accused for promoting hatred and intimidation as well as weakening democracy by Tommy Zambrano, the subsequent president of the National Congress of Honduras.l

He joined the party Libre in 2025.

== Notes ==
Political offices
Preceded by Mauricio Oliva	President of the National Congress; 2022–2026	Succeeded by Tomás Zambrano
