= Mauricio Oliva =

Honduran politician

Mauricio Oliva Herrera
- Oliva in 2018

President of the National Congress of Honduras
- In office 25 January 2014 – 25 January 2022
- Preceded by: Juan Orlando Hernández
- Succeeded by: Luis Redondo

Deputy of the Choluteca Department
- In office 25 January 2002 – 25 January 2022

Personal details
- Born: 8 March 1951 (age 75) Tegucigalpa, Honduras
- Party: National Party
- Spouse: Rina Brizzio
- Education: National Autonomous University of Honduras
- Profession: Surgeon, Politician

Mauricio Oliva Herrera (born 8 March 1951 in Tegucigalpa) is a Honduran surgeon and politician. He served as deputy of the National Congress of Honduras representing the National Party of Honduras for Choluteca and as the President of the National Congress of Honduras.

In 2021, he was a candidate in the National Party primary for the presidential election. He was considered the candidate closest to President Hernández. He lost the primary to Nasry Asfura.

Political offices
Preceded by Juan Orlando Hernández	President of the National Congress; 2014–2022	Succeeded by Luis Redondo Guifarro
