= Juan Orlando Hernández =

President of Honduras from 2014 to 2022

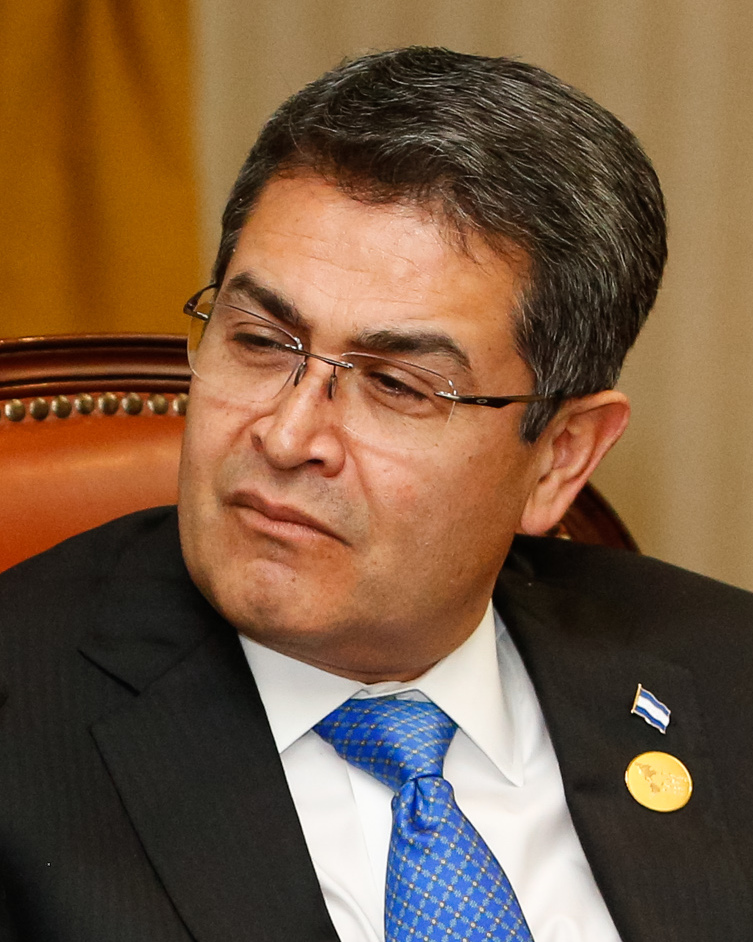
- Hernández in 2018

38th President of Honduras
- In office 27 January 2014 – 27 January 2022
- Vice President: See list: First Ricardo Álvarez Arias (2014–2022); Second Ava Rossana Guevara (2014–2018) Olga Margarita Alvarado (2018–2022); Third Lorena Enriqueta Herrera (2014–2018)
- Preceded by: Porfirio Lobo Sosa
- Succeeded by: Xiomara Castro

President of the National Congress
- In office 25 January 2010 – 25 January 2014
- Vice President: Lena Gutiérrez
- Preceded by: José Alfredo Saavedra (acting)
- Succeeded by: Mauricio Oliva

Deputy of the Lempira Department
- In office 25 January 1998 – 25 January 2014

Personal details
- Born: Juan Orlando Hernández Alvarado; 28 October 1968 (age 58) Gracias, Lempira, Honduras
- Party: National
- Spouse: Ana García Carías (m. 1990)
- Domestic partner: Cossette Lopez (2010–present)
- Children: 5
- Relatives: Hilda Hernández (sister); Tony Hernández (brother)
- Education: National Autonomous University of Honduras (BL)
- Website: Official website

Military service
- Allegiance: Honduras
- Branch/service: Honduran Army
- Years of service: 1983–1985 (reserve)
- Rank: Sub-lieutenant

Juan Orlando Hernández Alvarado (Spanish pronunciation: [ˈxwan oɾˈlando eɾˈnandes]; born 28 October 1968), also known by his initials JOH, is a Honduran convicted criminal and politician who served as the president of Honduras from 2014 to 2022.

A member of the National Party, Hernández served as the president of the National Congress of Honduras between January 2010 and June 2013, when he was given permission by the Congress to absent himself from all responsibilities in the Congress to dedicate himself to his presidential campaign. He announced that he would seek re-election in 2017, after the Supreme Court allowed it in April 2015. On 15 December 2016, the Supreme Electoral Tribunal decided, by two votes to one, to allow Hernández to stand in the primary elections by the National Party of Honduras on 12 March 2017. On 12 March 2017, he won the National Party's primary vote to allow him to represent his party during the 2017 general election on 26 November 2017. In the elections, Hernández was declared the winner by a narrow margin (0.5%), after a reelection campaign criticized as fraudulent by OAS, while the United States recognized Hernández as the official winner. On 27 January 2022, the same day he ceased to be president, he was sworn as a member of the Central American Parliament.

On 1 July 2021, Hernández had his visa revoked by the U.S. Department of State due to involvements in corruption and in the illegal drug trade. This measure was made public on 7 February 2022, less than two weeks after he was succeeded by Xiomara Castro. On 14 February, he was surrounded by the national police and DEA agents at his home in Tegucigalpa, after the U.S. government had requested his extradition for his involvement with narcotics. On 15 February 2022, he agreed to surrender to U.S. authorities, and on 21 April, Hernández was extradited to the United States. On 8 March 2024, Hernández was convicted of three counts of drug trafficking and weapons conspiracy, and on 26 June of that year, he was sentenced to 45 years in prison. On 1 December 2025, he was released from prison after being formally pardoned by U.S. President Donald Trump.

== Early life and career ==
Hernández was born in Gracias, Honduras, to Juan Hernández Villanueva and Elvira Alvarado Castillo, as the fifteenth of seventeen children. His siblings include Hilda Hernández (1966–2017) and Juan Antonio (Tony) Hernández, a former deputy once in U.S. federal custody on drug trafficking charges. He has a master's degree in public administration from the State University of New York at Albany. He was a coffee-growing campesino in his native Gracias. Hernández, who represented the department of Lempira since 2001, was elected President of the National Congress where the National Party had a comfortable majority, on 21 January 2010, and took office four days later.

== Presidential campaigns ==
In 2012, Hernández fought a campaign against Ricardo Álvarez to try to become the National Party presidential candidate for 2013, and won the internal election of November 2012; Álvarez publicly denounced the result as fraudulent and demanded a "vote by vote" recount, which the Tribunal Supremo Electoral (TSE) rejected. A poll conducted in May 2013 saw him in third place with a projected 18% of the vote.

Hernández began his presidential campaign in July 2013 in Intibucá and La Paz with a campaign entitled El Pueblo Propone (The People Propose in English). He campaigned for the military to police the streets, and claimed that his closest rival Xiomara Castro wanted to remove the Policía Militar (English: Military Police) which were already in Honduras' two main cities. He won the election, beating Castro by 250,000 votes. Hernández said National Party accountants found that approximately L3 million lempira (about US$140,000) from companies with links to the Honduran Social Security Institute (IHSS) scandal had entered its campaign coffers.

On 22 April 2015, the Supreme Court unanimously allowed presidential re-election. On 12 March 2017, Hernández became the National Party candidate by defeating his rival Roberto Castillo during the National Party primary. The Honduran Constitution allows revocation of citizenship of anyone who promotes changing the law to allow re-election; however, Hernández's National Party, which also controls Congress, said a 2016 Supreme Court ruling allowed him to stand for a new term. Opposition Liberal Party argued that the court did not have the power to make such decisions. He was re-elected in the 2017 presidential election after a vote deemed fraudulent by the opposition and international observers. The government declared a state of emergency. Some 30 demonstrators were killed and more than 800 arrested. According to the United Nations and the Inter-American Commission on Human Rights, "many of them were transferred to military installations, where they were brutally beaten, insulted and sometimes tortured".

== President of Honduras (2014–2022) ==
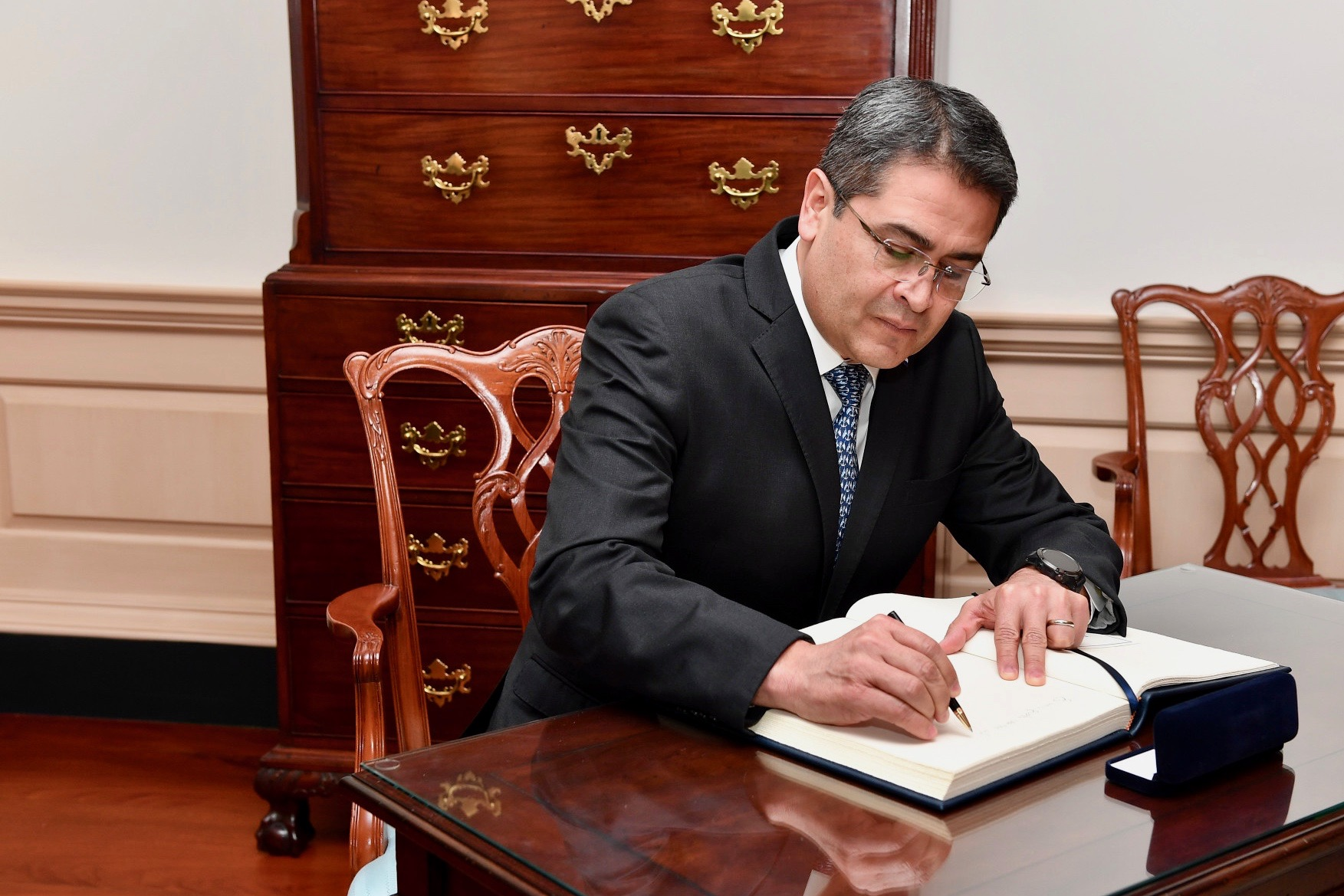
Hernández in 2018

=== Protests ===
Hondurans both in and outside Honduras have protested against alleged corruption by the Hernández government, the judiciary, the military, the police, and other public administration entities, demanding an end to embezzlement of funds and public money. In May 2015, Radio Globo discovered documents that allegedly showed that the Honduran National Party had received large amounts of cash from nonexistent companies through fraudulent contracts awarded by the IHSS when it was run by Mario Zelaya. The contracts were approved by the National Congress when Hernández was its president and the party funding committee was headed by his sister, Hilda Hernández. Hernández has accepted that his election campaign received money from companies tied to the scandal, but denies any personal knowledge. By June 2015, Hernández had appointed a commission to investigate the cause of the corruption.

In 2017, the Drug Enforcement Agency in Miami arrested Hernández's brother, Juan Antonio Hernández, for drug trafficking and for using Honduran military personnel and equipment to ship cocaine to the United States on behalf of the Mexican Sinaloa Cartel. On 21 June 2018, president Hernández ordered units of the Honduran Army and the military police in the streets of the capital after renewed protests. According to a Hospital Escuela Universitario spokesperson, at least 17 people suffered bullet wounds as a result of violence in the protests, and two of them died at the hospital. In April 2019, new anti-privatisation and anti-corruption protests erupted, led by Tegucigalpa Autonomous University students and by health care workers. Tear gas was used against the protesters in demonstrations that took place in the center of Tegucigalpa.

=== Rosenthal family and Tony Hernández cases of drug trafficking ===
On 7 October 2015, the United States Department of Justice released a statement saying that Jaime Rosenthal, his son Yani Rosenthal and nephew Yankel Rosenthal, as well as seven other businesses, were labeled "specially designated narcotics traffickers" under the Foreign Narcotics Kingpin Designation Act, the first time this had been used against a bank outside the United States. As a result, the Honduran National Commission for Banks and Insurance (Comisión Nacional de Banca y Seguros, CNBS), forcibly liquidated the Banco Continental, property of the Rosenthal family, which was closed by Monday, 12 October 2015, as well as other businesses and properties allegedly involved in money laundering. Hernández said that the financial system "is solid" and made it clear that this "is a problem between Banco Continental and the USA justice system".

President Hernández's brother, Antonio "Tony" Hernández, was convicted in the USA on drug trafficking charges and sentenced to life imprisonment. After Tony Hernández's conviction on 18 October 2019, 7,000 supporters of President Hernández, including members of the official National Party of Honduras, marched in Tegucigalpa. President Hernández criticized his brother's conviction as basado en testimonios de asesinos ("based on testimony from killers") and denied that Honduras had become a narco-state.

=== Religious conservatism ===
The presidency of Hernández was marked by an increase in the influence of conservative evangelical organizations and Opus Dei on government decisions. Compulsory prayer at the beginning of the day was instituted in schools and in certain institutions such as the police and the army. At the beginning of 2021, the total prohibition of abortion and same-sex marriage was included in the Constitution, making it very difficult to change the law later on.

=== Fake Facebook supporters ===
From June to July 2018, 78% of Hernández's Facebook posts received fake engagement and likes, artificially boosting Hernández' apparent popular support by a factor of five. The social manager of the official Facebook pages of both Hernández and his late sister, who had served as communications minister, was directly controlling several hundred of these fake entities. This campaign used Facebook's Organization Pages, configured with human names and photos, to add apparent support and to lure unaware readers.

=== Foreign policy ===
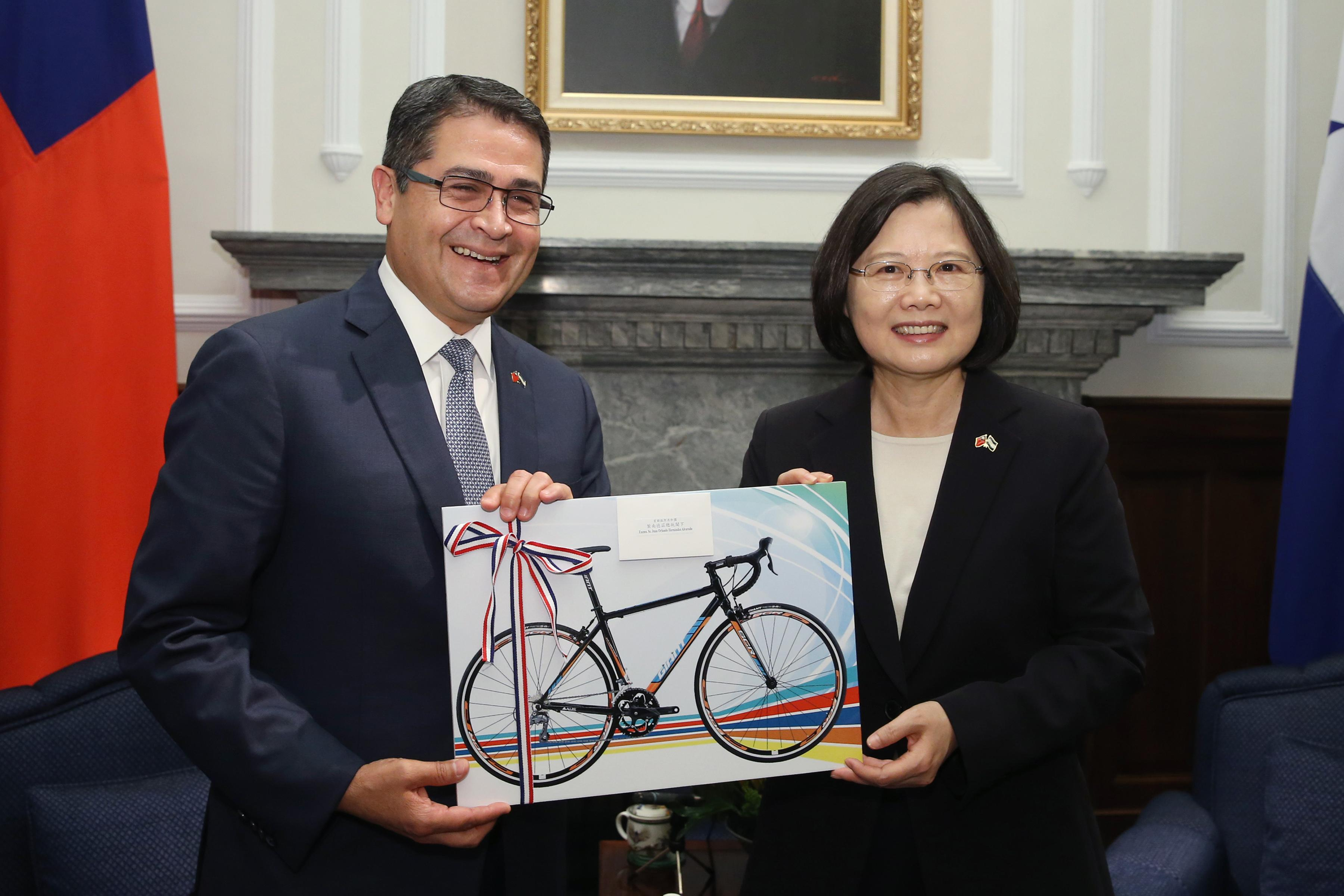
Hernández with Taiwanese President Tsai Ing-wen in Taiwan, 2 October 2016

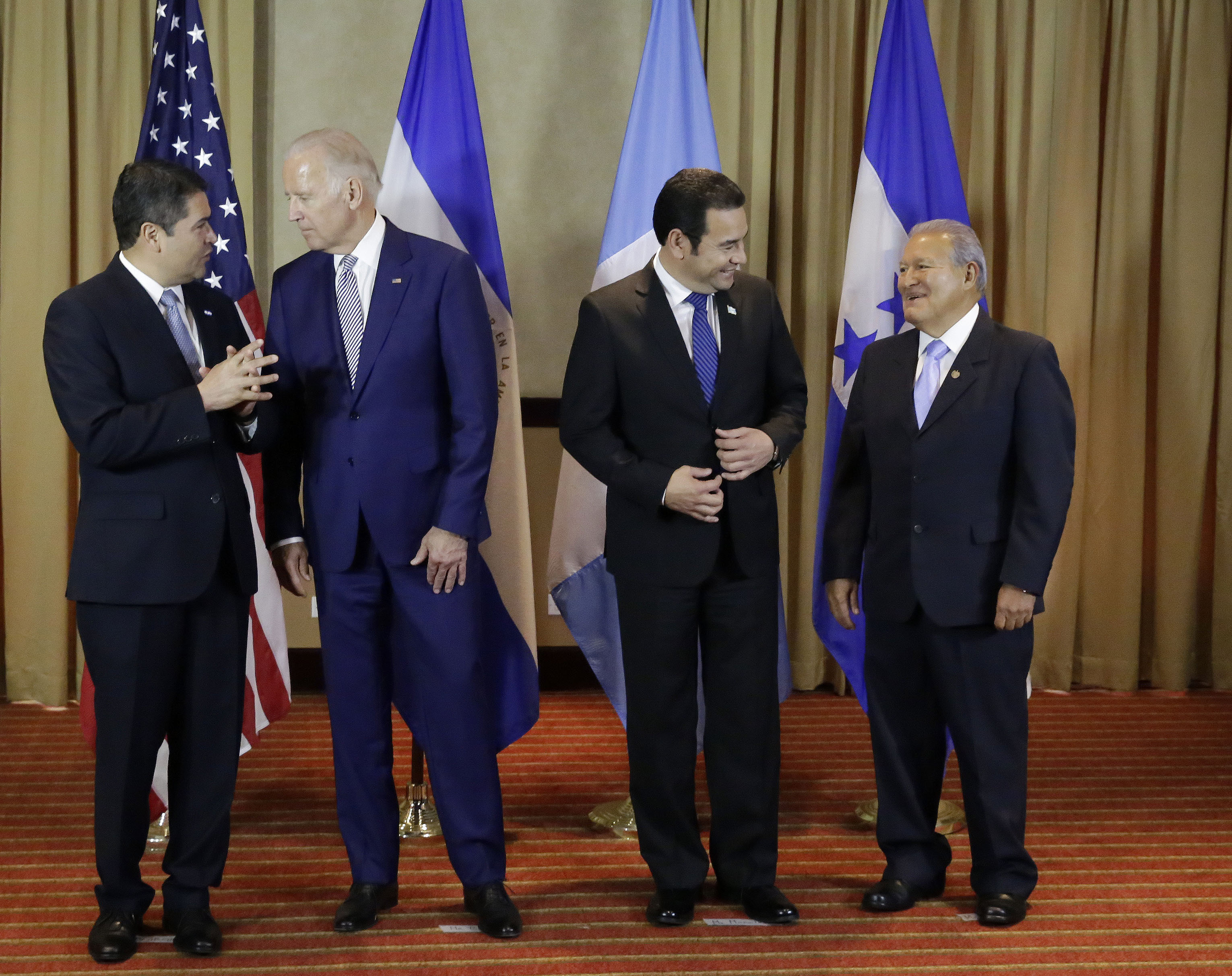
Hernández with US Vice President Joe Biden, Guatemalan President Jimmy Morales, and Salvadoran President Salvador Sánchez Cerén, 2016

Hernández maintained good relations with the Obama and Trump administrations in the United States. Hernández was seen as a key ally in Central America given the presence of Daniel Ortega in Nicaragua. In 2019, during the Venezuelan presidential crisis, Hernández recognized the legitimacy of Juan Guaidó as president of Venezuela and joined the declarations of the Lima Group, against the Maduro government. In the same way, Hernández supported the pronunciations of the Organization of American States (OAS), regarding the crisis in Venezuela.

In 2021, Hernández travelled to Israel, where he met with prime minister Naftali Bennett, and where he inaugurated Honduras's embassy in Jerusalem, becoming one of the countries which officially recognize Jerusalem as the capital of Israel. Shortly before leaving office, in October 2021, contrary to his alliance with the US, Hernández met Nicaragua's Ortega in Managua, where they signed agreements regarding disputes in the Caribbean Sea and the Gulf of Fonseca, on which there had been a ruling by a The Hague court years earlier. The summit between Hernández and Ortega was described as "strange", "surprising", and "unusual" by El País, given the leaders' differences in previous years.

== U.S. drug trafficking investigation, arrest, extradition, conviction, and pardon ==
At the end of May 2019, U.S. prosecutors unsealed documents from 2015 which revealed that Hernández was himself the subject of a major drug trafficking and money laundering investigation, alongside his sister Hilda and others. Hernández was identified as a co-conspirator in a drug trafficking and money laundering case against his brother, according to document filed in U.S. district court. Prosecutors alleged $1.5 million in drug proceeds were used to help elect him in 2013. Hernández responded by saying he was a foe of traffickers, who were out for revenge against him.

A document released by a U.S. district court implicated Hernández in a conspiracy with his brother, Tony Hernández, and other high-level officials — including his presidential predecessor Porfirio Lobo Sosa — "to leverage drug trafficking to maintain and enhance their political power." Tony Hernández was sentenced to life in prison in January 2021 following his conviction on numerous drug trafficking charges.

On 7 February 2022, it was announced that Juan Orlando Hernández's U.S. visa was revoked by the Department of State at the start of July 2021, due to involvement in corruption and narcotics. On 14 February, he was surrounded by the National Police and DEA agents at his residence to process his capture and eventually take him to custody of the United States for possible trial. The U.S. government also requested his extradition for involvement with narcotics. After an extradition warrant was issued, Hernández decided to surrender to US authorities on 15 February 2022. The same day, local authorities arrested Hernández at his home in Tegucigalpa.

On 15 February, Hernandez's first extradition hearing before the Supreme Court of Honduras took place, Justice Edwin Ortez presiding. At a second hearing on 16 March, Ortez approved the extradition order lodged by the Southern District of New York. Hernández's lawyers appealed Ortez's ruling, but on 28 March 2022, the Supreme Court rejected his appeal and authorized his extradition to the United States. On 21 April, Hernández was extradited to the United States. The United States District Court for the Southern District of New York unsealed their indictment, charging him with conspiracy to import cocaine to the United States (21 U.S.C. § 963), as well as firearms charges (under 18 U.S.C. § 924).

The United States specifically charged Hernández with accepting millions of dollars in bribes from narcotraffickers since 2004, and in particular the Sinaloa Cartel, led by Joaquín "El Chapo" Guzmán. The indictment stated that Tony Hernández collected the bribes using men armed with machine guns; in exchange, Juan Orlando Hernández conspired to protect smugglers from investigation and arrest, specifically providing "access to law enforcement and military information, including data from flight radar in Honduras". In a video statement posted on social media, Hernández said he was innocent and that he had been set up by drug traffickers. On 10 May 2022, Hernández pled not guilty to all charges and complained about the conditions in which he was being held, with his lawyer describing those conditions as those of a "prisoner of war", and saying they were "psychologically debilitating". Hernández's trial began on 21 February 2024 in New York City and concluded with a guilty verdict on 8 March. On 26 June, he was sentenced to 45 years in prison.

In November 2025, days before the Honduran general election, President Donald Trump announced that he would grant Hernández a federal pardon and endorsed Nasry Asfura, the candidate from his party. On 1 December 2025, Hernández was released from the United States Penitentiary, Hazelton, located in Hazelton, West Virginia, after receiving a pardon from Trump for his drug conviction. Trump falsely claimed that the investigation into Hernández was a "Biden administration set up”, and that "They basically said he was a drug dealer because he was the president of the country". The Wall Street Journal later reported that "Trump pardoned Hernández so quickly that White House chief of staff Susie Wiles and other senior officials had no advance notice." Hernández's release came as Honduras was locked in a "technical tie" for the election of a new president. On the afternoon of 1 December, there were just 515 votes separating Asfura from his nearest challenger, Salvador Nasralla, a former TV host standing as a centrist candidate. However, on 2 December 2025, Nasralla, who also previously challenged Hernández in the 2017 Honduras presidential election, took the lead over Asfura, with Trump alleging election fraud without evidence. Asfura was ultimately elected president, defeating Nasralla by 40.3% to 39.5%. On 8 December, the Honduran government issued an international arrest warrant for Hernández. His lawyer described the move as political. Juan Orlando Hernández returned to Honduras in July 2026, after a judge temporarily suspended his arrest warrant.

== Personal life ==
Hernández married Ana García Carías on 3 February 1990, with whom he has three children. He is the brother of convicted drug trafficker Tony Hernández.

== Honors ==
- Order of Brilliant Jade with Grand Cordon (Taiwan)

== See also ==
- Honduras Activate
- List of people granted executive clemency in the second Trump presidency
- Hondurasgate

Political offices
Preceded by José Alfredo Saavedra; Acting	President of the National Congress; 2010–2014	Succeeded by Mauricio Oliva
Preceded by Porfirio Lobo Sosa	President of Honduras; 2014–2022	Succeeded by Xiomara Castro
Party political offices
Preceded by Porfirio Lobo Sosa	National Party nominee for President of Honduras; 2013, 2017	Succeeded by Nasry Asfura
