= Chronology of the 2009 Honduran constitutional crisis =

The 2009 Honduran constitutional crisis was a political confrontation concerning the events that led to, included, and followed the 2009 Honduran coup d'état and the political breakdown associated with it. The coup was repudiated around the globe, but Roberto Micheletti, head of the government installed after the coup, has claimed that the Honduran Supreme Court ordered the detention of Manuel Zelaya, the deposed President of Honduras, and that the following succession was constitutionally valid.

The policies of Zelaya drifted to the left, causing conflicts with the political establishment. He advocated a constitutional assembly to write or reform the constitution with a fourth ballot box referendum, but opponents considered writing or reforming the constitution via a referendum was unconstitutional.

Following the removal of Zelaya as President, there were problems with the interim presidency of Micheletti and efforts were being made both domestically and internationally to resolve the political crisis. The crisis ended after President Porfirio Lobo assumed office in January 2010.

== September 30, 2008 ==
Zelaya issued emergency executive decree 46-A-2208, which authorized the transfer of 30 million lempiras of public money to the advertising of his fourth ballot box. Soon afterwards, he issued another emergency executive decree which was identical, except that the money was transferred to his office.

Auditors later found that Zelaya's administration issued 29 checks and spent a total of 29,995,887.62 lempiras. It is unclear whether another 30 million was withdrawn. It was also discovered Manuel Zelaya spent more than 100,000 lempiras in veterinarian's fees for his horse, Coffee. This was criticized. The supposed advertisers paid no sales tax. The Supreme Audit Court's investigation raised concerns of squandering.

== November 11, 2008 ==
President Zelaya announced that he was seeking to have a fourth ballot box, or cuarta urna, installed at polling places during the next election, which was scheduled for the 29 November 2009. The fourth ballot, which would be in addition to the usual ones for presidential, congressional and local elections, would ask voters whether they wanted to hold a National Constituent Assembly to draft a new constitution.

Zelaya, whose presidential term was to expire on 27 January 2010, would be ineligible, under the term-limitations of the present constitution, to run in the 2009 election.

== February 2009 ==
=== February 17 ===
At a public showcasing of tractor equipment received from Venezuela, Manuel Zelaya states that he will propose a fourth ballot box, according to a June editorial in La Prensa.

== March 2009 ==
=== March 24 ===
Zelaya called for a preliminary poll to be held on 28 June 2009 to gauge popular support for the idea of including the Constituent Assembly question in the November 2009 election. On that day he issued executive decree PCM-05-2009 for the National Statistical Institute to hold the poll by June 28, 2009. The question to be asked in this preliminary poll was:

"Are you in accord that in the general elections of November 2009 there be included a fourth ballot in which the people decide whether to convoke a National Constituent Assembly?"

President of the Congress, Roberto Micheletti, stated that article 374 of the constitution states that no referendum can be used to alter the entrenched articles in the constitution that are specified in article 384. Note that article 374 does not say that; and there is no article 384: the constitution has only 378 numbered articles. Apparently either the BBC, La Tribuna (the BBC's source), or Micheletti are in error. The quote from Micheletti, copied and pasted from the BBC article, is: "El artículo 374 dice que no se podrá utilizar el plebiscito y el referendo para reformar los artículos pétreos que establece el artículo 384 y que se refiere a la forma de gobierno, al territorio nacional, al período presidencial, a la prohibición para ser nuevamente Presidente de la República al ciudadano que lo haya desempeñado bajo cualquier tipo y referente." (BBC's source was La Tribuna.) He stated that even to announce such a referendum privately is a crime (" . . . porque eso, incluso, anunciarlo privadamente es un delito.")

== May 27, 2009 ==
In late May, an administrative court ruled Zelaya's plan illegal. On May 27, Micheletti announced that he had submitted evidence to the public prosecutor that the Executive branch had put out a contract to have him killed. He said that for more than a month he'd been followed and menaced with death and placed responsibility on the Executive branch. Zelaya responded that "whoever made these claims had swine flu and was delirious."

== June 2009 ==
=== June 3 ===
Congress passes a resolution warning Zelaya to correct his administrative conduct.

=== June 10 ===
The council of the Bar Association of Honduras unanimously agreed that Zelaya's plan is illegal. It asked Zelaya to stop the illegalities and recommended officials not follow his illegal orders.

=== June 11 ===
Civil societies demonstrated against the illegalities and asked the state prosecutor to take necessary action against Zelaya.

Members of the Democratic Unification Party reported that the government had given Cesar Ham 4 million lempiras to promote Zelaya's illegal poll.

=== June 19 ===
More than 5,000 people marched in opposition to Zelaya's plans.

=== June 20 ===
Thousands march to defend the constitution and oppose Zelaya's violations of law. The demonstrators expressed sharp opposition to Hugo Chávez.

=== June 22 ===
Political analyst and former minister German Leitzelar noted that "According to the Penal Code Article 302, officials promoting the fourth urn could face between 15 and 20 years in prison, accused of the crime of treason".

=== June 23 ===
Around 120,000 people marched in San Pedro Sula to defend the constitution and oppose Zelaya's illegal plans. They were dressed in white and carried the national flag as well as banners supporting peace, democracy and freedom.

The National Congress passed a law forbidding holding referendums and plebiscites less than 180 days before the next general election; as the next elections are set for 29 November 2009 this would have made the 28 June 2009 poll illegal.

Former President Rafael Leonardo Callejas warned Zelaya not to proceed with his illegal plans and reminded everyone that the courts decide what is legal and what is illegal, not the president.

=== June 24 ===
After 11:00 people dressed in white marched to defend the constitution and oppose Zelaya's "illegal" plans. The demonstration was organized by the Comité para la Democracia y la Paz. After speeches people cheered and chanted "Viva Honduras, we want to be free and democratic!".

The military is in charge of security and logistics in elections in Honduras. Zelaya asked them to perform their election role for the referendum, but the head of the military command, General Romeo Vásquez Velásquez, refused the order to pass out the election materials, brought from Venezuela, because the Supreme Court ruled the referendum to be illegal. Zelaya fired him. Later that day, the defense minister and heads of the army, navy and air force resigned.

Zelaya's followers violently attacked anti-Zelaya demonstrators near the presidential palace.

=== June 25 ===
Just days before his illegal survey, PCM-019-2009, which revokes the decree PCM-05-2009 and was issued (but not published) in March, is published in the official Gazette, Zelaya issued a new executive decree PCM-20-2009 (Gazette number 31945) which annulled PCM-05-2009 and PCM-19-2009. The new decree calls for a "Public Opinion Survey Convening a Constitutional Assembly".

All dependencies and organs of Public Administration, Secretaries of the State, centralized and decentralized institutions are instructed to incorporate and actively execute all assigned tasks to carry out the project known as: Survey of Public Opinion to summon a National Constituent Assembly; which is considered an official activity of the Government of the Republic of Honduras.

A Venezuelan plane landed at Toncontín International Airport. The plane carried electoral material which had been printed in Venezuela.

At 11:00 a.m., the Supreme Electoral Tribunal ordered the confiscation of electoral materials.

At 12:00 p.m., the Constitutional Room of the Supreme Court of Justice of Honduras ruled that General Velásquez be reinstated.

At 15:00, Zelaya took possession of the impounded ballots at military base Hernan Acosta Mejia, which were then moved by them to the presidential palace.

At a televised gathering of his supporters, Zelaya said that "[t]he only one who can't be re-elected is the President, but re-election is a topic of the next National Constitutional Assembly"—a statement taken by some to be a proposal in violation of the current Honduran constitution, while others viewed it as merely conjecture regarding a possible future new constitution.

Members of Congress said that Zelaya made a "very serious" mistake.

=== June 26 ===
Generation for Change (Generación por Cambio) youth movement protested outside Venezuelan embassy in Honduras against Chavez, Zelaya, and the coming referendum. They carried red handkerchiefs in their mouths to symbolize the censorship in Venezuela.

The Peace and Democracy Movement held a massive rally in Tegucigalpa's central park. Participants said that the rally was in defense of the constitution and democracy, and against Zelaya's attempts to modify the constitution. Members of the Civic Democratic Union also gathered to express their opposition to the illegal survey.

Local Catholic leader Auxiliary Bishop Darwin Andino of the Catholic Church stated that the Church did not support the referendum efforts of Zelaya, that the country must not surrender to Chavez nor anyone else, and that the constitution must be defended by all Hondurans.

Congress began discussing how to impeach Zelaya. Congress opened an investigation into whether Zelaya had violated the constitution and whether he was "mentally incapable" of holding office. Zelaya responded to the President of the National Congress Roberto Micheletti, a member of the same party who has since been sworn in as President in his stead, by saying "What's with you, Roberto. I was elected by the people, not the congress. How would you make me ineligible, you're a lousy second-rate congressman who got your post because I gave you space in my party."

President of Congress Micheletti wrote to Romeo Vásquez Velásquez saying "Respectfully I am writing you to greet you and to remind you of the Mission to be undertaken June 28; that already the institution that you lead has been called to defend our constitution and country and every one of those Hondurans thanks you ... These people who say they are Hondurans and wish to change our constitution don't deserve to be in our country, violating our constitution and selling our country."

A Honduran Supreme Court judge issued a sealed order, based on the Attorney General's petition, to detain José Manuel Zelaya Rosales for 18 different charges including "acting against the government, treason, abuse of authority, and usurpation of power" in relation to the poll.

United States Senator John Kerry, chairman of the Senate Foreign Relations Committee, expressed concern about the growing tension in Honduras over the referendum vote. "America values its longstanding partnership with Honduras, but a push to rewrite the constitution over the objections of Honduras's top court, legislature, attorney general, and military is deeply disturbing", said Kerry. "The people of Honduras deserve a democratic process that is legal, fair and transparent. I applaud the Organization of American States (OAS), consistent with its commitment to fully respect members' sovereignty, for calling an emergency meeting to discuss the crisis in Honduras."

=== June 27 ===
UN chief Ban Ki-moon urged "restraint by all concerned" amid rising political unrest in the country and expressed concern about the tensions. "It is important for the country's leaders to act with full respect for the rule of law and democratic institutions, and to seek consensus on the pressing political issues through a peaceful and inclusive dialogue", a UN statement said.

=== June 28 ===
Soldiers stormed the presidential palace early in the morning, disarming the presidential guard, waking President Zelaya and arrested him and put him on a plane to Costa Rica, in what he immediately denounced as a coup.

The Honduran National Congress agreed to:

- Accept Zelaya's letter of resignation.
- Under the Articles 1, 2,3,4, 205, 220, subsections 20, 218, 242, 321, 322, 323 of the Constitution of the Republic,
  - Disapprove Zelaya's repeated violations of the constitution, laws and court orders.
  - Remove Zelaya from office.
- Name the current President of Congress Roberto Micheletti to complete the constitutional period that ends on January 27, 2010.

A group of around 150 people that supported Zelaya gathered outside the building in protest, throwing stones at soldiers and shouting "traitors, traitors". The protest grew from hundreds to thousands. According to The New York Times, "several thousand protesters supporting the (ousted) president faced off against soldiers outside the presidential palace, burning tires." For several hours on Sunday, electricity and communications in the capital Tegucigalpa were interrupted.

The nation's Congress approved a decree on July 1 that applied during an overnight curfew and allowed security forces to arrest people at home and hold them for more than 24 hours. The Washington Post reported that the "new Honduran government clamped down on street protests and news organizations [July 1] as lawmakers passed an emergency decree that limits public gatherings following the military-led coup that removed President Manuel Zelaya from office." The decree also allowed for suspects to be detained for 24 hours and continued a nighttime curfew.

The broadcast of some news media, including a Venezuelan station, were restricted in Honduras on June 29. Members of the military reportedly shut down at least one radio station and halted TV transmission of teleSUR and CNN en Español. Associated Press reporters have been arrested. The Miami Herald reported on July 1, that broadcasting stations are friendly to the new government.

According to El Tiempo, the newspaper El Tiempo had been censored as to what it could print about the developments. Canal 11 located in Colonia de Miramontes was also prohibited to broadcast information about the developments. The Cable Color buildings, which also broadcasts programming of CNN and TeleSUR, were surrounded by military forces.

According to a press release published on the website of Radio Globo Honduras, a station which has long sided with Zelaya, a group of 60 soldiers took the radio off the air and the employees, including Alejandro Villatoro, were allegedly threatened and intimidated. The station was allowed to resume transmission, but staff had to follow rules which they believed limited freedom of expression. CNN in Spanish had interruptions of its transmission. The website of the radio was down but has been re-established. Alejandro Villatoro said that he was arrested and kidnapped for some hours by the military forces.

Honduran newspaper La Prensa reported on 30 June that an armed group of Zelaya supporters, attacked La Prensa's main headquarters by throwing stones and other objects at their windows, until police intervened. The paper supposed the group was led by Venezuelan and Nicaraguan nationalities.

Media outlets complained that the government ordered them not to report any news or opinion that could "incite" the public. News organizations in Honduras were polarized. Journalists working for small independent media—or for those loyal to Zelaya—reported being harassed by officials.

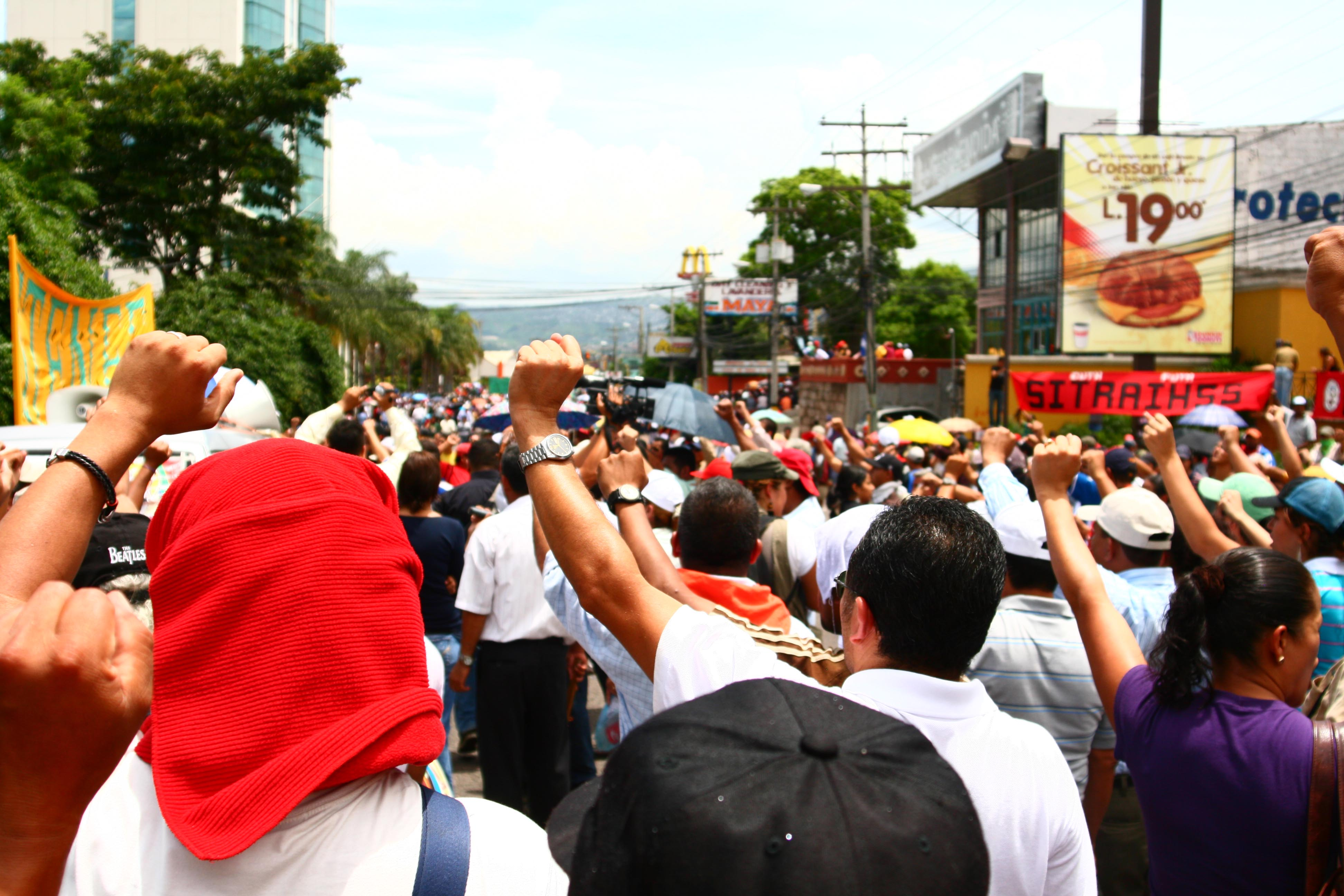
Pro-Zelaya protesters marching in Tegucigalpa

On Sunday night, Reuters reported that hundreds of pro-Zelaya protesters, some masked and wielding sticks, set up barricades of chain link fences and downed billboards in the center of Tegucigalpa and blocked roads to the presidential palace. Reuters witnesses heard gunshots outside the presidential palace that apparently came after a truck arrived at the protest, and an ambulance also appeared. It was not clear who fired the shots. One witness said shots were fired only in the air and there were no initial reports of injuries.

Late at night on Sunday, June 28, Zelaya and Foreign Minister Rodas flew to Managua, Nicaragua, to attend a meeting the next day of the Central American Integration System. Also planning to attend the meeting were several heads of state of the Rio Group and ALBA including Hugo Chávez and Felipe Calderón. At the meeting, the presidents of Central America agreed to freeze all official payments and loans to Honduras.

=== June 29 ===
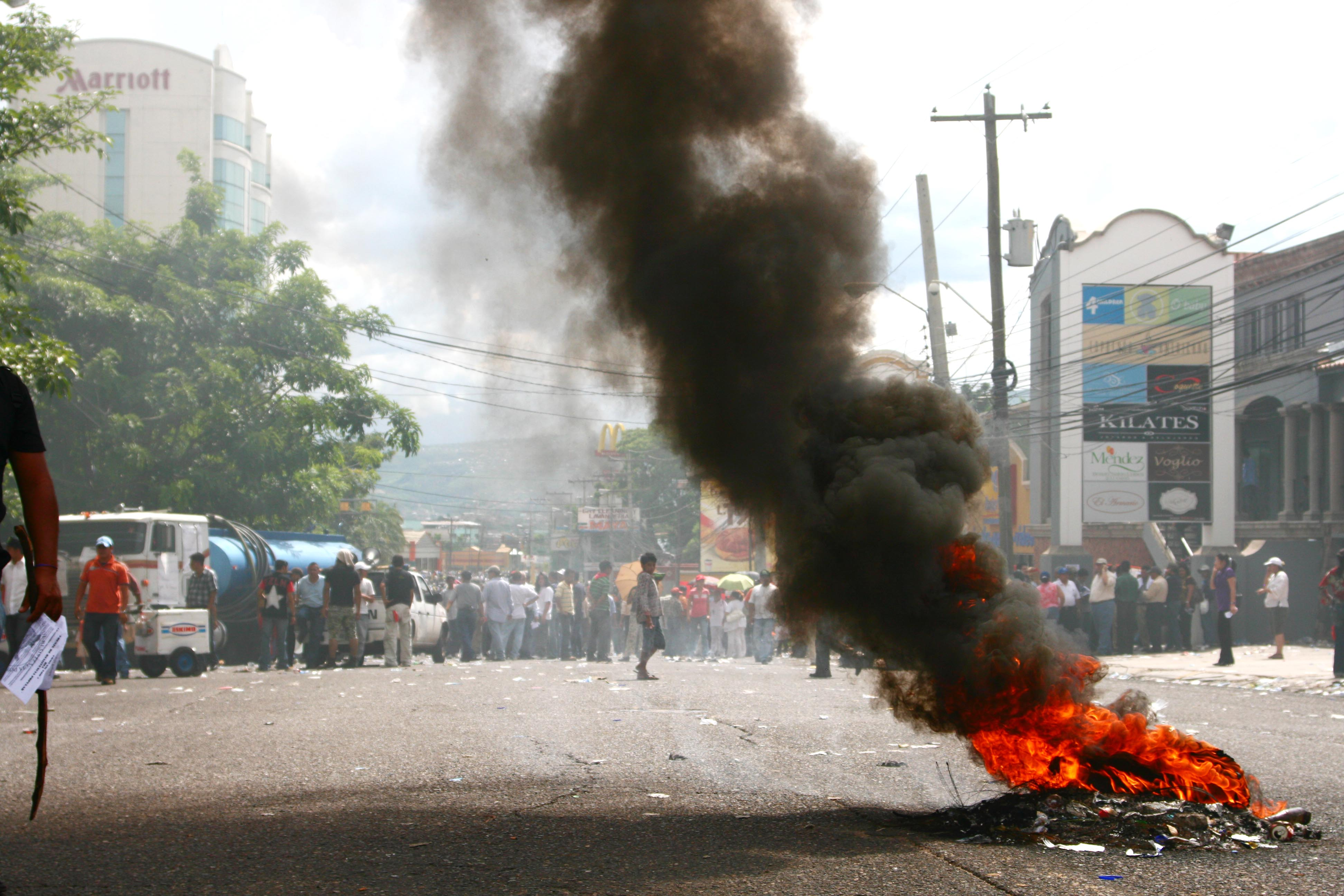
A small fire started during a pro-Zelaya demonstration

Protests continued the following Monday. Around 1,500 pro-Zelaya protesters taunted soldiers and burned tires just outside the gates of the presidential palace in a face-off with security forces. CNN reported that although the military had fired tear gas into the crowd at some point, the day was "generally calm" in Honduras. Two people were reportedly killed as a result of clashes between protesters and soldiers. Juan Barahona, leader of the United Workers Federation, claimed soldiers opened fire on the crowds with live ammunition. News media remained off air, replaced by tropical music, soap operas, and cooking shows. Reporters Without Borders condemned the "news blackout" and Reuters reported the use of Twitter to beat the censorship.

President of the Honduran Peace Committee, Dr. Juan Almendares, speaking 29 June on Democracy Now! said: the military are taking repressive actions against some members of the legitimate government of President Zelaya and also popular leaders. He claimed that there is "effectively" a national strike of workers, people, students and intellectuals.

Zelaya announced in Managua on Monday night that he would be returning to Tegucigalpa on Thursday, July 2. He also invited fellow Latin American leaders, including OAS general secretary José Miguel Insulza, to accompany him on his return. The new foreign minister of Honduras, Enrique Ortez, said that Insulza and any other presidents would be welcome but that Zelaya would not be allowed to enter.

In one of the protests, about 2000 pro-Zelaya protesters marched to the Pacific from La Colonia Las Brisas de Comayaguela to Boulevard Juan Pablo Segundo, in Tegucigalpa. The march was organized by employees of Zelaya's government and workers' groups.

There were also protests in San Pedro Sula in which the Bloque Popular and more pro-Zelaya protesters asked for the restitution of Zelaya to power.

=== June 30 ===
Pressure on the new government continued to grow as the United Nations General Assembly unanimously adopted a resolution which called for the reinstatement of Zelaya as the President of Honduras. Zelaya spoke in front of the General Assembly where he was applauded several times. In his speech, Zelaya promised not to seek another term as President and said that he would not accept a second term if he were asked to serve again. After the UN session, Zelaya then headed to Washington, D.C., where he was going to attend an emergency meeting of the Organization of American States General Assembly convened under the Inter-American Democratic Charter to discuss the crisis. In Washington, Zelaya was scheduled to meet with United States Assistant Secretary of State Thomas Shannon.

Meanwhile, Honduran Attorney General Luis Alberto Rubi announced that Zelaya would "immediately" be arrested if he returned to Honduras, where legal officials have accused him of 18 crimes including "treason" and "abuse of authority".

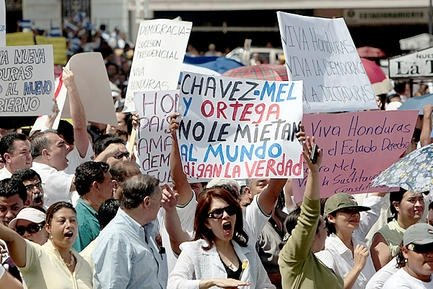
Anti-Zelaya demonstrators; one holds a sign warning against Hugo Chávez, Zelaya and Daniel Ortega

Pro-Zelaya protests continued on Tuesday, June 30. Union leaders announced a nationwide strike and estimated that up to 10,000 pro-Zelaya protesters were marching in Tegucigalpa and around the country.

Demonstrations in favor of the constitution and against Zelaya took place. In a speech, Armeda Lopez said "Chavez ate Venezuela first, then Bolivia, but in Honduras that didn't happen". Roberto Micheletti made an appearance and said that the November general elections will be held as scheduled and that a new president will be sworn in on January 27, 2010. Micheletti also had strong words for the crowd: "They told me a few people with leftist intentions would try to scare us, but not the brave men and women of our nation", as sympathizers responded with chants of "Democracy! Democracy!". General Romeo Vásquez Velásquez also attended and spoke at the rally.

The World Bank announced that it would stop disbursing loans of up to $270 million U.S. dollars to Honduras until the political situation stabilizes.

== July 2009 ==
=== July 1 ===
The Organization of American States General Assembly agreed on Wednesday to a resolution which "condemns vehemently" Zelaya's removal and gives Honduras three days to restore Zelaya to the presidency or face possible suspension from the group. Zelaya then announced that he would postpone his planned return, which was initially scheduled for Thursday, July 2. Instead, he would wait until the OAS deadline runs out, and then return to his country. The United States also said it would wait until the deadline ran out before considering what to do about US aid to Honduras, which by law must be cut off if a head of state is overthrown in a coup. After the OAS meeting in Washington, Zelaya flew to Panama City in order to attend Ricardo Martinelli's inauguration as President of Panama.

Meanwhile, Interim President Roberto Micheletti reiterated that Zelaya would be arrested as soon as he were to set foot in the country. In an interview with the Associated Press, Micheletti said that only a foreign invasion could restore Zelaya as president. "(Zelaya) can no longer return to the presidency of the republic unless a president from another Latin American country comes and imposes him using guns. I was appointed by Congress, which represents the Honduran people. Nobody can make me resign unless I break the laws of the country", said Micheletti.

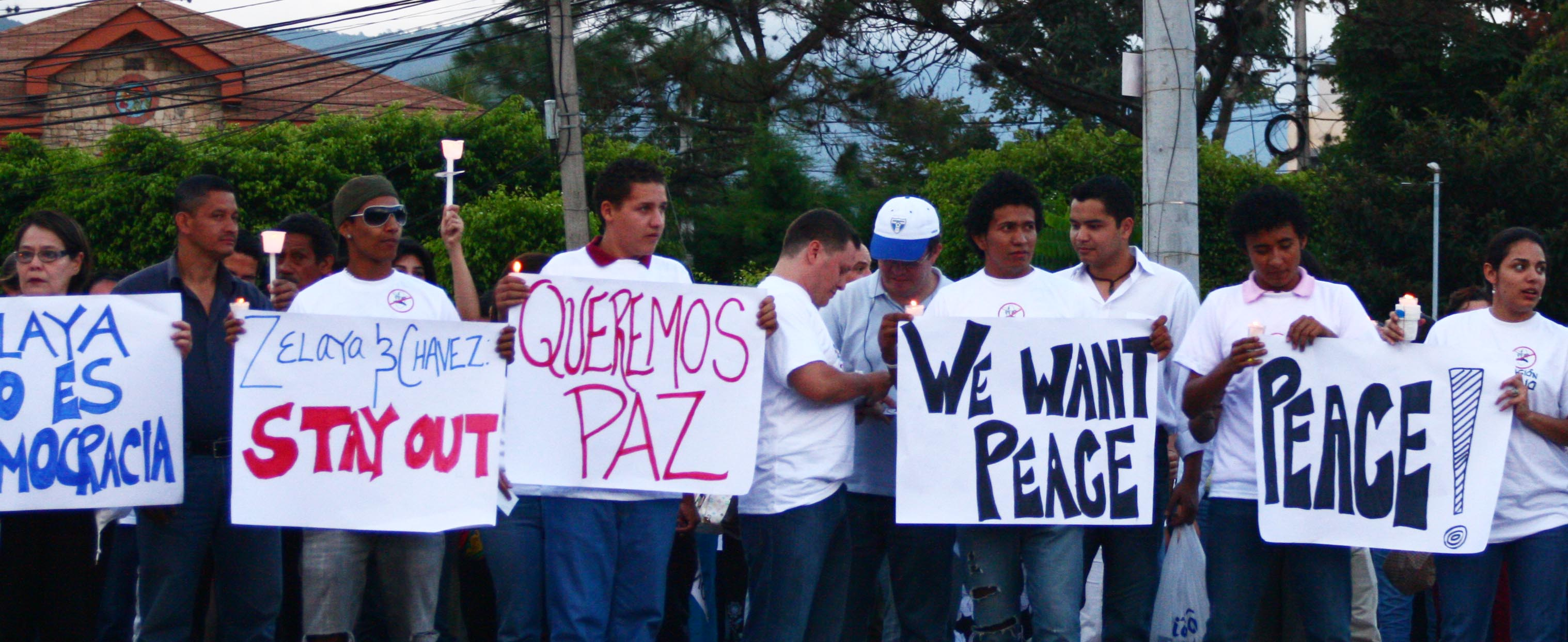
Hondurans promoting peace and opposing Zelaya and Chavez

Micheletti later announced at a press conference that a delegation representing the new government would travel to Washington on Wednesday to meet with the OAS. The delegation would explain to OAS General Secretary José Miguel Insulza "what really happened" in Honduras, according to Micheletti.

The Washington Post reported that Spain, France, Italy, Chile, and Colombia began recalling their ambassadors on July 1. The United States announced the suspension of joint military operations.

Some members of the Honduran Congress said that they were discussing ways of reaching a compromise among themselves that would reinstate Zelaya. They warned, however, that such a deal could be a hard sell, given the widespread opposition to Zelaya in Congress.

The New York Times reported that despite the uncompromising public statements of the two sides, O.A.S. officials claimed they had begun informal talks with people close to the Micheletti government to seek a peaceful resolution. The Times said that one proposal that had been floated was for an amnesty for the people who overthrew Zelaya in exchange for his reinstatement and a guarantee that he would not seek another term.

Both pro- and anti-Zelaya demonstrations continued throughout the country. The largest anti-Zelaya rally occurred in Choluteca, which received heavy coverage by the Honduran press. The pro-Zelaya protests were largely ignored by the same media outlets. Pro-Zelaya protesters claim that the authorities are trying to prevent them from converging to protest, while allowing pro-Micheletti demonstrators easy access to popular places for demonstrations.

The pro-Zelaya protesters have been targeting a Burger King franchise in central Tegucigalpa that is owned by Micheletti supporters. The restaurant has been looted several times. Also, several hundred pro-Zelaya student activists erected barricades of boulders, signposts and metal sheeting near the presidential palace. They covered their faces with bandanas and carried bats, branches and gasoline-filled bottles. Eventually however the activists removed the barricades and joined a larger, peaceful protest.

There was evidence that Venezuelan, Nicaraguan and Cuban nationalities had attempted to create a conflict. To ensure democracy, the rule of law, public safety and peace, the National Congress issued an order (decreto ejecutivo N° 011-2009) at the request of President Micheletti temporarily suspending four constitutional guarantees during the hours the curfew is in effect. These include articles 69, 71, 78, and 81 of the constitution. Article 69 guarantees the right of personal freedom. Article 71 requires being brought before a judge within 24 hours of being arrested. Article 78 provides for the freedom of association and assembly, and article 81 provides for freedom to move, enter, leave and remain in the country.

=== July 2 ===
Honduran police confirmed the presence of Venezuelans, Cubans and Nicaraguans.

Honduran Congress passed an emergency decree that limits public gatherings following Zelaya's arrest. Honduran government restricted street protests and news organizations.

More marches against Zelaya and in favor of the new government were carried out in Tegucigalpa. The anti-Zelaya demonstrators, numbering over 10,000 according to La Prensa, chanted against Zelaya, Hugo Chávez, and foreign interference in Honduran affairs.

In San Pedro Sula, 350 police and military broke up the thousands of pro-Zelaya protesters who were demonstrating in the center of the city with tear gas and water cannons and chased protesters for blocks. During the pursuit, some protesters committed acts of vandalism. Xinhua reported at least two deaths, 60 injuries, and 270 arrests. El Tiempo notes that among the arrested were bystanders not involved in the demonstration. Police are now stationed in the center of the city to prevent demonstrators from recongregating.

The police announced the arrest of Marcelo Chimirri, ex-manager of the phone company Hondutel, who they accused of corruption. Marcelo Chimirri was appointed head of Hondutel by Zelaya. Marcelo Chimirri had been under investigation for his involvement with the Latinode case in Miami where Latinode executives confessed to paying bribes to Hondutel executives in exchange for lower rates.

The Committee of Relatives of the Disappeared in Honduras (COFADEH), an association for civil rights, said that on Wednesday 1 July, police and military were flattening homes and sequestering people in the communities of Olancho, which is the birthplace of the president in exile, Manuel Zelaya Rosales. The military operations have occurred in communities Guacoca, San Francisco de la Paz, and Salamá Guarizama. The association denounced that the Armed Forces and the Police have unleashed repression against the people of Honduras and all liability for the violations being committed against social leaders, against whom there are arrest warrants, residents, rural communities, students, peasants and workers.

Zelaya, meanwhile, announced to a press conference that he would pardon those involved in what he called "the coup" when he returns as President of Honduras. "I am a Christian and know how to forgive and pardon. The people of Honduras will not forgive, but from me, in my heart, there is no ill-will towards anyone", he said.

Micheletti's government stated that it is willing to hold this year's presidential election early, and that it might hold a referendum on allowing Zelaya to serve the remainder of his term, although holding such a referendum immediately would be "difficult".

=== July 3 ===
Around 70,000 people demonstrated for the constitution and against Zelaya.

A video showing the army shooting out pro-Zelaya protesters' bus tires was released on CNN.

There were protests for and against Zelaya in Tegucigalpa. The pro-Zelaya protesters marched from Universidad Pedagógica Francisco Morazán down the Boulevard Juan Pablo II to Toncontin airport. The protesters against Zelaya concentrated in Plaza La Libertad and the interior of the Casa Presidencial and were organized by Comisión Cívica Democrática.

Radio Globo Honduras said that when Zelaya was giving an interview to the radio on Wednesday 1 July, the radio was switched off by military forces. There was said also that the military forces are keeping guard on the transmissors of the radio since Sunday 28 June.

The interim government withdraws from the OAS, saying that there is no longer space for Honduras there. New deputy foreign minister Martha Lorena Alvarado said that her government "repudiates" the "unilateral measures" and "unworthy unilateral resolutions".

The Supreme Court of Honduras has rejected a demand by the Organization of American States to reinstate the ousted President, Manuel Zelaya. OAS chief Jose Miguel Insulza was told the court's position was "irreversible" when he met its president for two hours in the capital Tegulcigalpa. Danilo Izaguirre, spokesman for the Supreme Court, confirmed that it had rejected the OAS secretary general's demand. "Insulza asked Honduras to reinstate Zelaya but the president of the court Jorge Rivera categorically answered that there is an arrest warrant for him", he said.

Of the 128 National Congress deputies, 19 refused to recognize Michelletti as the president of Honduras, with 13 Zelaya deputies of the Liberal Party of Honduras and 5 deputies from Democratic Unification Party.

Radio America journalist Gabriel Fino Noriega was murdered near La Ceiba.

=== July 4 ===
During the first five days out of country, Zelaya had spent 80,000 dollars of Honduran public money to luxury goods, including luxury hotels, food and fine clothing. Honduras canceled his governmental credit card, as well as lease of 50 luxury vehicles, 61 mobile phone lines, and 100 bank accounts.

Many demonstrations for the constitution, peace, democracy and against Zelaya's attempts to return to power took place in Tegucigalpa, San Pedro Sula, Talanga, La Ceiba, El Progreso, Choluteca, and other cities. Again, demonstrators dressed in white.

Archbishop Cardinal Oscar Rodriguez Maradiaga asked Zelaya not to return to Honduras because his return could cause a bloodbath. The Archbishop also read from Article 102 of the Constitution stating that no Honduran can be expatriated or handed over to a foreign State and that he believed that everyone merited an explication of what happened on June 28 and called for dialogue. Later that day Zelaya announced he would return to Tegucigalpa on Sunday, accompanied by various presidents and other international representatives, calling on supporters to remain peaceful: "Do not bring weapons. Practice what I have always preached, which is nonviolence. Let them be the ones who use violence, weapons and repression."

In Honduras the protests for and against Zelaya continued. A source estimated the crowd at 10,000.

OAS Secretary General Jose Miguel Insulza went to Honduras to seek Zelaya's reinstatement. The Organization of American States suspended Honduras on Saturday (July 4) after the caretaker government refused to reinstate President Manuel Zelaya.

A fragmentation grenade exploded July 4, Saturday night, in the first floor of the offices of Canal 11, the same buildings where El Tiempo is located. It was allegedly thrown from a nearby street.

=== July 5 ===
An estimated 20,000 soldiers are guarding the airport.

Hugo Chávez and the "Africanized bees" text, which is visible on the right side of Chávez's head.

Venezuelan TV showed Hugo Chávez watching Zelaya's attempt to land. Accidentally visible on the television was Chávez's blackboard and the text:

051345JUL09 Enjambre de abejas africanas, Tribuna Presidencial, heridos por picadas y desesperación de las personas.

Translation in English:

051345JUL09 Swarm of africanized bees, Presidential Podium, wounded by stings and desperation of the people

051345JUL09 appears to be a military code for July 5, 2009 at 13:45. Coincidentally, 13:45 was the time violence started in Toncontin airport.

Chávez tried to explain the text by saying that there was a small hive of bees threatening participants in the military parade in Ciudad Bolívar in Venezuela.

Former President Ricardo Maduro visited US Congressmen to explain that what occurred in Honduras was a constitutional succession.

According to the Associated Press, Zelaya, accompanied by several ambassadors and the United Nations General Assembly president, departed Washington's Dulles Airport on a jet, registration N515RN owned by CITGO a subsidiary of the Venezuelan PDVSA, hoping to land in the Honduran capital. Further Associated Press have quoted Zelaya as saying "No one can obligate me to turn around. The constitution prohibits expelling Hondurans from the country. I am returning with all of my constitutional guarantees." But with their safety in the air not guaranteed, Ecuadorean President Rafael Correa pleaded with the Honduran military forces to avoid bloodshed. "If there is violence the whole world must clearly know who is responsible", he said.

After attempting to land without a flight plan filed, Zelaya's plane was turned away by trucks and soldiers stationed on the landing strip to prevent a landing.

Pro-Zelaya protesters, including some people throwing stones, were able to break through various security cordons to an area near the airport. Stephen Ferry, an international press photographer at the scene, reported seeing government forces attack the protest. "I saw a kid being shot in the head, I think he is dead ... There are lots of injured — I don't know how many. They just opened fire — it was completely unprovoked." Hospital sources and police said at least two people had been killed and a number had been injured. Later, the de facto government declared a curfew from 6:30 pm until 5 am, Tuesday July 7, and closed Toncontin airport for another 24 hours beginning at 6 am July 6. One of the dead was identified as 19-year-old Isy Obed Murillo Mencía. The government denies having fired the fatal shot that killed Mencía, and BBC video captured the image of at least one protester holding a gun.

The Official Government stance held that Isy Obed Murillo was killed by the protesters, but a study made by the Truth and Reconciliation Commission claims to debunk that stance. The Commission had access to the official forensic report, where it highlights that the trajectory of the shots and the location at which the bullet shells where found make it nearly impossible for the shots to originate from the protesters at the area. The Commission holds the hypothesis that the shots were made by members of the Army, but it claims that certainty is impossible to reach, as the military refused to cooperate with the criminal investigations ordered in September of that year

La Prensa reports that Zelaya supporters are paying people L250-L300 ($13.22 - $15.87) to demonstrate against the de facto government. Motorcyclists and taxis were paid for transporting protesters.

=== July 6 ===
Hospitals in Tegucigalpa reported receiving victims shot by military patrols during the nightly curfew. Another pro-Zelaya march is underway in Tegucigalpa, Monday morning.

According to TeleSur and other media, Honduran constitutional president Manuel Zelaya is to travel on July 6 to Washington to meet US Secretary of State Hillary Clinton on Tuesday.

Panamanian president, Ricardo Martinelli says involvement of other countries in resolving the crisis "would worsen the current situation."

Rodolfo Pastor Fasquelle, Minister of Culture under Zelaya, told the BBC from hiding "Today there is the risk [of civil war] because both sides have a wide social base, they are completely polarised and they have weapons and resources." Presidential candidate Pepe Lobo (Nationalist Party) told El Tiempo's columnist Roberto Quesada that he was in favor of the reinstatement of Zelaya as President and would use his influence to detain the barbarism and see that that happened.

In the afternoon, the government issued a call for anyone who received funds to promote the opinion poll to return the monies to them.

The radio stations La Catracha and Cholusat Sur were able to operate again from 6 July. It was said that Canal 36 and La Catracha were taken off air because the director had said publicly that he was in favour of the Cuarta Urna. After the coup, the TV programmes Mi Nación on Honduras' Canal 13 and Hable como Habla broadcast by Canal 66 of Maya TV were banned. The Federación Latinoamericana de Periodistas informed that the de facto government was persecuting some international correspondents, mainly those who work for members of ALBA. They had to leave, according to the communique, signed by Juan Carlos Camano. In an article, Radio Globo claimed that it is the only station covering everything live, on a dedicated channel about demonstrations against or in support of Zelaya.

=== July 7 ===
Large demonstrations in favor of the constitution, peace, new government, and in opposition to Zelaya. The demonstrations were called El Plantón del Millón and they were held in six cities.

Zelaya was in Washington to meet with U.S. Secretary of State Hillary Clinton. At this meeting, Zelaya agreed to a U.S.-backed proposal for negotiation talks with Micheletti government representatives in Costa Rica set for Thursday, July 9. Costa Rican President Óscar Arias, a Nobel Peace Prize laureate, would serve as mediator in the discussions. Zelaya later told a Honduran radio station that his return as President was "nonnegotiable" and that the talks are really just "the planning of the exit of the coup leaders". The Micheletti government also accepted the invitation, but maintained that Zelaya could not return as President.

Hillary Clinton announced after meeting with Zelaya, that the United States was suspending all of the military and some economic aid to Honduras. Suspended aid includes all military aid (about $16.5 million) and support supplied to the government for CAFTA-DR, and USAID programs ($1.9 million). Humanitarian aid to the Honduran people will continue as a policy matter.

Foreign relations minister in the interim government, Enrique Ortez Colindres, said in a TV interview that Obama "is a little black man who doesn't know where Tegucigalpa is located." He later apologised after U.S. Ambassador Hugo Llorens had said: "I express my profound indignation for the unfortunate, disrespectful and racially insensitive comments made about President Barack Obama."

Supreme Court spokesman Danilo Izaguirre has said that Zelaya might be granted political amnesty.

Honduran Cardinal Óscar Andrés Rodríguez Maradiaga said "We totally reject the interference of the president of Venezuela. We may be a small country, but we are a sovereign country".

Competing demonstrations continued in Tegucigalpa, meanwhile. Both pro- and anti-Zelaya marches were attended by thousands. The pro-Zelaya protest was led by Zelaya's wife, Xiomara de Zelaya, who was making her first public appearance since the beginning of the coup.

The de facto government Civil Aviation Authority (DGAC) announced that Toncontín International Airport would be closed through July 10 inclusive. To enforce the closure, the authorities placed an ancient Lockheed Electra in the middle of the runway. The Air Force began repairing the damaged fences around the southern end of the runway.

=== July 8 ===
The interim government lifted its closure of Toncontín International Airport Wednesday morning, requesting that the airlines return to their normal flight schedules. On July 6 it had issued orders to close the airport for 5 days.

Colombia arrested 80 Venezuelans who attempted to travel to Honduras. The pro-Zelaya group was so-called "Bolivarian Continental Caravan".

A group of pro-Zelaya taxi drivers and other Zelaya supporters blocked one of the main roads to Nicaragua in a protest against the events. Later on July 27 found a booklet of receipts in a car of pro-Zelaya organizer which included a $2,500 payment to the president of taxi drivers' association.

Venezuela's oil minister, Rafael Ramírez, confirmed on Wednesday 8 July that his country had halted oil exports to Honduras until ousted president Manuel Zelaya was reinstated. Venezuela sends about 20,000 barrels (3,200 m^{3}) of oil a day to Honduras.

Manuel Zelaya landed in Costa Rica at 5:36 pm in a private jet from Washington, D.C. He said he is ready to start discussions tomorrow about ending the crisis, as required by resolutions of the OAS and UN, moderated by president Oscar Arias. He was accompanied by his chancellor, Patricia Rodas.

=== July 9 ===
Manuel Zelaya met at midday with Costa Rican president Oscar Arias in San Jose, who then awaited the interim president of Honduras. Micheletti arrived late then left early to return to Tegucigalpa. His four-person commission remained in San Jose to continue negotiations: Vilma Morales, Carlos López Contreras, Arturo Corrales and Mauricio Villeda. Spain offered to help with mediation. The interim government in Honduras announced that the curfew will be from 11:00 p.m. today until 4:30 a.m. Friday.

Jose Murillo, father of Isis Obed Murillo, the protester killed on July 5, was arrested.

=== July 10 ===
The commissions that represent Micheletti and Zelaya met July 10 until 3:30 pm with Oscar Arias, President of Costa Rica without reaching any agreements other than to meet again at some point in the future. The Zelaya commission is said to have requested that the next meeting be in Honduras. Rafael Pineda Ponce, the new Minister of the President for Micheletti, came on the radio in the early evening in Honduras and announced that the Micheletti commission was ordered to remain in San José, Costa Rica until all the conversations were resolved.

Enrique Ortez Colindres was sworn in as Micheletti's new Minister of Government and Justice, leaving the position of Foreign Minister occupied by the Vicechancellor, Martha Lorena Alvarado, until Michelleti names a new Chancellor.

Pro-Zelaya protesters took over the La Amistad bridge over the Ulua river in El Progresso on the north coast.

=== July 11 ===
Zelaya flew to Washington, D.C. from the Dominican Republic to meet with Jose Miguel Insulza, head of the Organization for American States, and with Thomas Shannon, a U.S. State Department official. Channel 8, the government channel, has broadcast anti-Chavez statements and songs of peace since coming back on the air after the June 28 coup.

Oscar Arias, President of Costa Rica, called for a renewed dialog between the commissions of Zelaya and Micheletti in San José, Costa Rica in 8 days.

=== July 12 ===
Two journalists working for TeleSUR and two working for the Venezuelan state television channel Venezolana de Televisión (VTV) were threatened by police on July 11. The TeleSUR journalists had just returned to their hotel, the Clarion in Tegucigalpa, and saw the VTV reporters being detained at reception. They in turn were ordered to stay in the hotel and wait for agents from immigration to check their papers, then leave the country as "there's nothing for you to report on here". The VTV reporters were taken to a police station and held until 3:30 am, because the car had been listed as stolen and the driver was arrested for car theft. Later the reporters were clearned of involvement and released. All of the Telesur and VTV reporters were told to leave the country, and were escorted to the airport on July 12, accompanied by representatives of Derechos Humanos (DDHH). Another group of four journalists, including an ACAN-EFE reporter, were held by police in their hotel in Tegucigalpa from early hours of the morning until 9 am July 12 allegedly on orders to wait for immigration authorities, who never materialized.

The anti-corruption prosecutor announced he had opened corruption investigations on 45 supporters of the 4th ballot box initiative, many of them Zelaya's cabinet officials. The list:

- José Manuel Zelaya Rosales
- Iris Xiomara Castro Sarmiento
- Zoe Zelaya Castro
- Xiomara Hortensia Zelaya Castro
- José Manuel Zelaya Castro
- Patricia Isabel Rodas Baca
- Enrique Alberto Flores Lanza
- Milton Danilo Jiménez Puerto
- Rixi Romana Moncada Godoy
- Mayra Yaneth Mejía Del Cid
- Carlos Orbin Montoya
- Carlos Eduardo Reina García
- Rodolfo Roberto Pastor Fasquelle
- Rodolfo Augusto Padilla Sunseri
- Fedra Nadime Thiebaud Garay
- José Holliday Venegas
- Fredis Alonso Cerrato Valladares
- José Raúl Valladares Fúnez
- Doris Yolany García Paredes
- Carlos Roberto Aguilar Pineda
- Jorge Alberto Rosa Zelaya
- Arístides Mejía Carranza
- Delia Beatriz Valle Marichal
- Tomás Eduardo Vaquero Morris
- Luis Roland Valenzuela Ulloa
- Marlon Antonio Brevé Reyes
- Marco Tulio Burgos Córdova
- Juan Carlos Elvir Martel
- Amable de Jesús Hernández
- César David Adolfo Ham Peña
- Eduardo Enrique Reina García
- Rebeca Patricia Santos Rivera
- Sonia Carolina Aspra Cruz
- Armando José Sarmiento Ney
- Orfilia Esperanza Carranza Medina
- Pedro Rafael Alegría Moncada
- Carlos Humberto Reyes
- Rodrigo Castillo Flores
- Carlos Ovidio Segura Aroca
- Roderico Argeñal Ardón
- Nehemías Martínez Argueta
- Aníbal Barrow
- Eulogio Chávez Doblado
- José Alejandro Ventura Soriano
- Edilberto Robles Aguilar

Two activists from the Unificación Democrática (UD) party were murdered in separate shootings. Roger Bados was shot in the back at his home in San Pedro Sula when he turned away from someone at his door to go get the person being asked for. Ramon Garcia was shot as he got off a bus in Callejones, Santa Barbara.

The Secretary of Information, Réne Cepeda, told the AFP that the de facto government issued a request that the UN send an independent Human Rights commission to Honduras to cut down on the disinformation. This was confirmed in a press conference by the spokesperson for the Policia Nacional, Héctor Mejia, in talking about the detention of the Venezuelan journalists. In the same press conference he confirmed that 1270 persons had been arrested for curfew violations since the curfew began. The curfew was cancelled today.

=== July 13 ===
President Zelaya's chief of staff, Enrique Flores Lanza, declined to say whether the exiled leader would participate in the second round of talks, mediated by Costa Rican President Oscar Arias, which may resume on July 18 to try to resolve the country's political crisis.

Chavez called the mediation talks in Costa Rica "dead before they started", and Zelaya has vowed to return to Honduras at any moment.

Honduras's acting president swore in a new foreign minister, Carlos López Contreras. Lopez Contreras said that only Congress can grant amnesty. Valladares, the acting president's chief of staff, said the interim government may try to hold a vote in September if possible. Otherwise they'll hold a vote in November, as stipulated in the constitution.

The US Department of State is encouraging Americans not to visit Honduras, where an unstable political situation has led to sporadic demonstrations.

The New York Times revealed that two former aides of Bill Clinton were advising Micheletti and the de facto government in their interactions with US legislators in Washington, D. C. and their meetings with Oscar Arias in San José, Costa Rica. Lanny Davis, who served as President Clinton's personal lawyer, was hired by the Honduran chapter of the Business Council of Latin America to help their delegation lobby against economic sanctions against Honduras. Bennett Ratcliff showed up as part of the Micheletti delegation meeting with Oscar Arias in Costa Rica, but refused to give The New York Times any information about his role there.

=== July 14 ===
Overriding the US travel advisory, right-wing columnist Dennis Prager broadcast his show from Honduras to "show solidarity with an unfairly isolated country, and to encourage, by example, people to visit Israel then and Honduras now." Prager compared the actions of Zelaya towards illegally changing the constitution, with the efforts of Zelaya's own Liberal Party to preserve democratic rule.

=== July 15 ===
The Honduran Roman Catholic Church declared it firmly supports the ouster of President Manuel Zelaya, Cardinal Rodriguez stated that Zelaya "doesn't have any authority, moral or legal. The legal authority he lost because he broke laws and the moral authority he lost with a discourse full of lies."

Deposed President Zelaya called for a popular insurrection in Honduras. Interim foreign minister Carlos Lopez said Honduras had removed the curfew and was not issuing threats. In San Jose, mediator Arias urged patience. General Romeo Vasquez, head of the Honduran army, said that Zelaya was exiled to avoid "deaths and injuries". Colonel Ramiro Archaga, spokesperson for the Minister of Defense, stated that the politicians could not "wash their hands" (lavarse las manos) by blaming the military for the deportation of Zelaya on June 28, assuring a reporter for the newspaper El Tiempo that they had sufficient documentation that the expulsion of Zelaya was a decision of the State (estado) and not just the armed forces.

The de facto government re-established the curfew because of the threat of a national strike July 16.

=== July 16 ===
In an interview on Radio Monumental of Costa Rica, President Oscar Arias said that he had a mandate from 34 world governments to restore constitutional order in Honduras, by which he meant restore president Jose Manuel Zelaya. He rejected Micheletti's proposal to step down if Zelaya did not return to power. He said, "we will see if we can talk of an amnesty, and for who, over political offenses (veremos si se puede hablar de una amnistía, y para quiénes, sobre delitos políticos)". "Zelaya must abandon his goal of installing a fourth ballot box", he continued. Arias indicated he intended to propose a reconciliation government headed by Zelaya combined with political amnesty.

Ramon Custodio, the Human Rights Commissioner for Honduras, suggested that both Micheletti and Zelaya could resign in favor of Zelaya's former Vice President and current presidential candidate, Elvin Ernesto Santos, noting that Santos' resignation as Vice President in 2008, which Congress accepted, was an unconstitutional act which needs to be repaired.

Campesino leader Rafael Alegria announced that if there was no settlement in Costa Rica over the weekend, that there would be a national strike on Monday supported by a variety of unions within the country.

In Honduras, peaceful protests to allow Zelaya to return continued for the 18th day, with roads blocked in the north of the country, between Choloma and Puerto Cortés, while protesters in the west block the roads to Guatemala and El Salvador, and protesters in the department of Francisco Morazan blocked the road between Tegucigalpa and Comayagua. They also blocked the road between Tegucigalpa and Choluteca. The road between San Pedro Sula and the ruins at Copan was also cut, as was the road between San Marcos in Ocotepeque and the borders with El Salvador and Guatemala.

International banks contradicted a spokesperson for the de facto government who yesterday reported that loans from international institutions were not frozen. A World Bank spokesperson, Hugo Noé Pino, confirmed that the World Bank, Interamerican Development Bank, and the Centralamerican Bank of Economic Integration all had frozen any transfers to Honduras, and that Honduras was awaiting about $250 million from the World Bank, and similar amount from the Interamerican Development Bank.

Presidential candidate for the UD (Unificación Democratica) party, César Ham returned to Honduras from voluntary exile in Guatemala and Nicaragua and vowed to work for the restoration of Zelaya.

=== July 17 ===
The International Transport Workers' Union, which groups 4.5 million workers from 654 unions in 140 countries, began a boycott of Honduran-flagged ships to protest Zelaya's ouster. Its workers will refuse to load and unload Honduran ships.

The human rights NGO Centro de Investigación y Promoción de los Derechos Humanos (CIPRODEH) released a report on human rights violations since the coup d'état.

=== July 18 ===
Oscar Arias today proposed a seven point plan to both the Zelaya and Micheletti advisors in San Jose Costa Rica.

1. The legitimate restitution of José Manuel Zelaya Rosales as President of the Republic, an office in which he will remain until the end of the constitutional period for which he was elected, 27 January 2009, the date on which he will transfer power to the candidate designated freely and democratically by the people, in elections supervised and recognized by the international community.
2. The formation of a government of unity and national reconciliation, composed of representatives of the principal political parties.
3. The declaration of a general amnesty exclusively for all those political crimes committed in the event of this conflict, before and after the past 28th of June.
4. The express renunciation by President Zelaya, and his government, of the intention of placing a "fourth ballot-box" in the next elections, or to carry out any popular poll not expressly authorized by the Constitution of the Republic of Honduras.
5. Moving up the national elections of the 29th of November to the last Sunday in October, and moving up the electoral campaign from the first days of September to the first days of August.
6. The transfer of the command of the Armed Forces from the Executive Power to the Supreme Electoral Tribunal, one month before the elections, to guarantee transparency and normality of suffrage, in conformity with the terms of the Constitution of the Republic of Honduras.
7. The integration of a commission of verification composed by distinguished Hondurans and members of international organizations, in particular, by representations of the OAS, that will oversee the fulfillment of these accords and supervise the correct return to constitutional order.

At the start of negotiations the Zelaya council indicated that they accepted all seven points, while the Micheletti council indicated that they could accept no points without discussion, and that Zelaya's return was not negotiable. Arias said, at the end of negotiations on Saturday "There are still many differences and we'll try to bring the two positions closer."

=== July 19 ===
The talks being mediated by Oscar Arias broke off shortly after they resumed today when the Micheletti advisors showed up and were unwilling to talk about the Arias proposal, and instead insisted discussion focus on a new proposal which they brought with them from Tegucigalpa. "I'm very sorry, but the proposals that you have presented are unacceptable to the constitutional government of Honduras ... in particular your proposal number one", said Carlos Lopez, head of the Micheletti negotiating team.

The Micheletti proposal is also a seven point plan, but there its resemblance to Arias's plan ends. Micheletti proposes

1. The return of petitioner Mr. Jose Manuel Zelaya Rosales with the necessary guarantees so that he can exercise his right to due process before the Judicial Powers.
2. The guarantee of democratic order and respect of the separation of powers, for which is formed a government of unity and national reconciliation, composed of members of the political parties and social sectors, with conformity to the requirements, merit, suitability, and ethics to defend the national sovereignty and combate drug traffic.
3. The guarantee of a state of rights and rejection of corruption and unpunishability, assuring at the same time the respect for the professionalism of the National Police, whose turnover should strictly follow the rules laid down in the enabling legislation. As a consequence of the above, he should preserve the integrity of public funds and return these public funds that he has taken and used illegally. At the same time he should respect the budget proposed by the National Congress recently.
4. The formation of a truth commission so that the people of Honduras and the international community can identify all the acts that lead to the actual situation, before, during June 28, and later, and make them known and publicized.
5. The possibility to move up the elections already scheduled, by accord with what the Supreme Electoral Tribunal decides in consultation with the presidential candidates.
6. Putting the Armed Forces and the National Police under the control of the Supreme Electoral Tribunal 4 months before the elections to guarantee transparency, liberty, and normalcy in the electoral process, which is a high priority of national security, in conformity with the Constitution of the Republic and the electoral law and the political organizations. The professionalism and functions of the Armed Forces should be respected and assured as expressed in the Constitution of the Republic and all changes should be strictly according to the law constituting the Armed Forces.
7. The integration of a commission of verification composed of notable Hondurans who will watch over the conformance with this agreement and periodically inform the Honduran people and international community.

The talks broke down shortly thereafter. Arias asked for 72 hours more to try and reach an agreement with both sides. Late in the evening, US Secretary of State, Hillary Clinton, called Micheletti and warned him of the consequences of failing to accept the principles that Arias had laid out. She threatened to cut economic aid to Honduras if the talks fail, and hinted that there might be long-term consequences to US-Honduran relations.

=== July 20 ===
José Miguel Insulza, the chief of the Organization of American States, made a statement indicating support for Zelaya's apparent movement towards a confrontational strategy with Micheletti's de facto government. "Insurrection and confrontation are not a good path to take, but I don't think we will avoid it unless the de facto government shows some flexibility", he said. However, in one of the first implicit criticisms of Zelaya to be issued by the OAS leadership during this crisis, Insulza also pleaded with Zelaya to wait out the 72 hours requested by Arias before staging a return to Honduras from exile in Nicaragua.

Carlos Eduardo Reina, a Liberal party leader, announced that Zelaya would return to Honduras on Friday. This decision respects the request of Insulza to wait out the 72-hour period requested by Arias.

The European Union announced it was freezing 65.5 million euros of budget support for Honduras.

=== July 21 ===
The Miami Herald's editorial staff, considered a voice for conservative opinion on Latin American issues, came out in favor of the Micheletti government accepting the seven-point Arias plan already accepted in principle by Zelaya's negotiators. While largely accepting Micheletti's casting of the coup as an attempt to preserve constitutional principles against Zelaya's actions, and characterizing those actions as a "power grab" on Zelaya's part, the editorial accuses Micheletti of "an unconstitutional response to Mr. Zelaya's unconstitutional behavior". Noting that the Arias plan also forbids Zelaya from seeking to hold any unconstitutional referendums, the editorial concludes that the seven-point plan is a "fair deal which protects democracy".

=== July 22 ===
A hundred thousand demonstrators, dressed in blue and white, marched against Zelaya. The demonstration was organized by the Unión Cívica Democrática.

Reuters reported that both sides in the crisis agreed to open new negotiations, and that at least some in the government would consider allowing Mr. Zelaya to return to power as President. The foreign minister of the interim government, Carlos Lopez, however, remained unwilling to consider Zelaya's return. Óscar Arias argued that both sides in the negotiation would have to give some ground in order to produce an agreement, and that an agreement favoring only one side of the dispute would not work. Arias went on to say "Neither side in this conflict will prevail. The victory will be halfway for both sides, or it will be for neither."

=== July 23 ===
The head of Zelaya's and Honduras' ruling Liberal Party in Congress, Valentin Suarez, said he expects the vast majority of lawmakers to vote against Arias' proposal. "The executive branch, the judiciary and Congress can't all be wrong", Suarez said. "It is a crazy recommendation for Hondurans." Zelaya headed towards Honduras despite US and OAS recommendations to wait. Lorena Calix, a spokeswoman for Honduras' national police spokeswoman Lorena Calix, said that when Zelaya "comes to Honduras, we have to execute the arrest warrant." He risks 43 years in prison over charges of violating governmental order, treason and abusing and usurping power. Honduran military checkpoints stopped thousands of Zelaya supporters from reaching the Nicaraguan border.

=== July 24 ===
Zelaya, surrounded by an entourage of supporters, entered Honduran territory from the Nicaraguan border and remained within Nicaraguan territory for a period of around 30 minutes. During this symbolic Zelaya comeback, Honduran state television displayed pro Micheletti, anti Zelaya demonstrations.

U.S. Secretary of State Hillary Clinton condemned Zelaya's crossing of the border into Honduras. "President Zelaya's effort to reach the border is reckless", Clinton said during a press conference. "It does not contribute to the broader effort to restore democracy and constitutional order in the Honduras crisis."

In Honduran border town El Paraíso, hundreds of Zelaya supporters defying a curfew clashed with security forces, near the Honduras-Nicaragua border. Many people saw opponent to the coup d'état Pedro Magdiel Muñoz Salvador, age 23, being detained by police and driven to a police station in El Paraíso.

=== July 25 ===
The body of Pedro Magdiel Muñoz Salvador, who had been detained by the police the previous day, was found in a deserted field at 6:30 in the morning, with 42 wounds from stabbing. Demonstrators and the National Front Against the Coup d'Etat stated that the murder had all the characteristics of 1980s actions of Battalion 3-16, as a method of "terrorising the masses of people participating in the struggle against the coup regime." COFADEH stated that Magdiel was the "sixth fatal victim" of the Micheletti de facto government.

Arias' proposal was submitted to the Honduran Attorney General, the National Congress, the Supreme Court for legal review. The Armed Forces of Honduras issued a press release in which they said they were respectful of the constitution and laws and subordinate to the civilian government. The affirmed their support for a solution to the problems facing the country through negotiations such as the San Jose Accords, and indicated their unconditional support for whatever results from those negotiations.

=== July 26 ===
Zelaya criticized the United States for not taking a clear stand regarding the coup. He asked for President Obama to prohibit bank transactions and cancel US visas of individuals involved.

=== July 27 ===
In an open letter to The Wall Street Journal published 27 July 2009, Micheletti listed the Honduran government's reasons and justification for Zelaya's ouster. In it, Micheletti claimed Zelaya's removal from office was supported by the Honduran Supreme Court (15-0), an overwhelming majority of the Honduran Congress, the Supreme Electoral Tribunal, the Administrative Law Tribunal, the independent Human Rights Ombudsman, the two major presidential candidates of the Liberal and National Parties, and Honduras's Catholic Cardinal. Micheletti also stated that this was no "military coup" since the military was following orders given by a civilian Supreme Court and Zelaya was replaced with a civilian from the line of succession prescribed in the Honduran Constitution.

- The articles quoted below are from conservative outlets owned by the country's elite who supported Michletti.

Police confiscates a booklet owned by Carlos Eduardo Reina, a leader pro-Zelaya operations. It contains a list of 15 receipts, dated July 24. Each receipt has the amount of money and the recipient's signature. The receipts totaled 160,000 U.S. dollars and included:

- Roland Valenzuela, former director of Pronaders, received $20,000.
- Cesar Ham, Democratic Unification Party, received $15,000.
- Nehemiah Martinez, former Vice Minister of Livestock, received $15,000
- Denis Antonio Sanchez, mayor of Santa Barbara, received $10,000
- Salvador Zuniga, an indigenous leader, received $10,000.
- Dinora Aceituno, a trade union leader, received $5,000.
- Rafael Alegría, a peasant leader, received $5,000
- Edilberto Robles, president of the National Association of Honduras taxi drivers, received $2.500
- John F. Díaz, coordinator of the department of Lempira, received $2,000.

Because Honduran currency is Lempira, the large amounts of U.S. dollars raised questions. Honduran police launched money laundering investigations. The United States had suspended Carlos Eduardo Reina's visa several months ago because human trafficking links.

The National Congress met to discuss a formal response to the San Jose Accords proposed by Oscar Arias. The session began at 4 in the afternoon with a little over half of the 128 members present. They quickly formed a 6 member committee to study the question of amnesty as covered in the document, then adjourned. The committee is not expected to report until Thursday. The Supreme court is also expected to consider the question of amnesty this week.

=== July 28 ===
The Supreme court ordered the military and police checkpoints to allow Xiomara Castro, Zelaya's wife, and supporters to be able to continue on to Los Manos on the Nicaraguan border to meet with Manuel Zelaya.

The United States State Department announced that it was canceling the diplomatic visas of 4 members of the de facto government who had worked in the Zelaya government and continued in the Micheletti government. While the State Department didn't reveal the names of those affected, the spokesperson for the de facto government, Marta Lorena Alvarado, indicated that the judge who issued the arrest order for Manuel Zelaya, judge Tomas Arita, was one of the four. El Heraldo identifies one of the other diplomats as José Alfredo Saavedra, president of the Congress. La Prensa identified the other two as Adolfo Lionel Sevilla, the minister of Defense, and Ramón Custodio, the Commissioner of Human Rights. At the same time, Spain called on the EU to revoke the visas of everyone in the interim government. Nike, the Adidas Group, Gap, Inc., and Knights Apparel urged US Secretary of State, Hillary Clinton, to work for the restoration of democracy in Honduras, in solidarity with the OAS and UN.

The de facto government of Honduras extended the curfew along the Nicaraguan border for a fifth full day.

=== July 29 ===
Roberto Micheletti expressed support for the San José Accord, which would let Manuel Zelaya return to power, according to officials in the de facto government and diplomats from the region. But the nation was so polarized over the possible return that Mr. Micheletti reached out to other regional leaders for help in building support for such a deal, especially among the country's elite, the officials said. Micheletti called Oscar Arias in the morning and asked for Enrique Iglesias, a former head of the Interamerican Development Bank, to be sent to talk with the three governmental powers and other factions of Honduran society. Arias said that Micheletti did not clarify if the San José Accord was accepted or rejected. Micheletti, in a press release, asked Arias to send a commission to start a dialog within Honduras towards reconciliation, a dialog that should include all parts of civil society. A source within the de facto government said it was unlikely they would change their mind and let Zelaya return.

Micheletti's government had shown every sign of determination to hold out until November presidential elections, gambling that the world would accept the new order after the polls.

Honduran political analyst Juan Ramon Martinez said Micheletti might be trying to float a more flexible image to the outside world while entrenching his position inside Honduras, where there have been large marches in favor of keeping Zelaya out.

=== July 30 ===
Zelaya said he had information that some soldiers and officers had been "repudiating the way in which the military leadership is directing the armed forces." He warned that young officers could rebel "at any moment" and force military chief Gen. Romeo Vasquez to restore the deposed president to power.

The head of the National Congress, José Alfredo Saavedra, announced that it would not hold its next session to consider the San Jose Accord until Monday, even though the subcommittee charged with considering the amnesty part of the proposal had finished its report. The delay was reported to be so that other sectors, such as the chief prosecutor, Luis Alberto Rubi, and the commissioner of Human Rights, Ramón Custodio, could be consulted.

The spokesperson for the Minister of Security noted that today the National Police had orders to disperse protesters blocking roadways.

An international human rights mission including, among others, Nora Cortiñas of Mothers of the Plaza de Mayo, reported that "the army and the special forces of the National Police of Honduras attacked thousands of pacific demonstrators, with fire weapons, wood and rubber projectiles and as well as tear gas, thrown even from helicopters." The international mission "gathered testimonies of protesters whom have been ill treated and brutally beaten, at times in a sexual manner (strikes on people's buttocks and threats of rape)" and said that minors had been attacked and detained. COFADEH stated that hundreds were injured and detained. In Tegucigalpa, protesters holding a "pacific demonstration" blocking the road north to San Pedro Sula were confronted with bullets and tear gas, and at least one protester, high school teacher Roger Abraham Vallejo Soriano (38 years old), was shot in the head and is in critical condition.

Carlos H. Reyes, president of the trade union STIBYS and an independent candidate for the presidency of Honduras was injured, and Juan Barahona, a coordinator of the National Front Against the Coup d'Etat, was detained.

Rafael Pineda Ponce, minister of Mr. Micheletti, reiterated today the de facto government's rejection of any return of Zelaya to power, saying that the administration was "firm, unchangeable" about Zelaya's return to power. An unnamed diplomat in Tegucigalpa said that Micheletti's calls for dialog are a delaying tactic so that the elections can happen and a new government assume power.

Manuel Zelaya left the Nicaraguan border with Honduras to meet with Hugo Llorens, US ambassador to Honduras, and others in the Honduran Embassy in Manaugua.

Ranking Member Richard Lugar of the US Foreign Relations Committee asked the Obama administration for a detailed explanation of its policy in the Honduran political crisis, warning that confirmation of Obama's nominees could be held up.

=== July 31 ===
Micheletti again insisted there would be no negotiated return to power for Manuel Zelaya. In comments made to the press after swearing in some more members of his government, he also criticized the United States as meddling. He said that if Hugo Llorens, the United States Ambassador to Honduras, had met with Zelaya yesterday in Managua, he was "making a serious mistake".

The European Union agreed to allow its member countries to enforce their own strict limits on visas for members of the de facto government. The 28 countries of the EU agreed to strictly limit contacts with the de facto government.

On Monday the National Congress will not hear the report of its committee studying whether or not to grant amnesty, as Jose Alfredo Saavedra had announced yesterday. Instead it will hear again from the Micheletti negotiating team about the San Jose Accord. Saavedra insisted that the representatives needed more time to inform themselves before making a decision. The study committee has been meeting with various groups outside of Congress to gather their opinion on amnesty. So far, they say, the majority of people are against it.

== August 2009 ==
=== August 1 ===
Middle school teacher Roger Vallejo, shot in the head during Wednesday's protests, died.

Micheletti expressed his surprise at the US support for Zelaya. "We are totally surprised with the attitude the Ambassador has taken, and we call for a correction. He can not be interfering in things that are strictly about Honduras." Micheletti went on to say that there was "no powerful people or country in the world that can make us yield."

=== August 2 ===
Middle School teacher, Martin Florencio Rivera, was killed as he left the wake for Roger Vallejo. He was stabbed 27 times, in the same way Pedro Muñoz was stabbed to death in El Paraiso after being held by the military. The family of Martin Florencio Rivera said his murder was unrelated to the political situation in Honduras and was because of robbery. Honduras is a country where several murders occurred every day even before the crisis.

=== August 4 ===
Following weeks of military intervention, threats and intimidation to Radio Globo, during which Radio Globo broadcast reports on human rights violations, the National Telecommunications Commission (CONATEL) terminated Radio Globo's emission frequency rights.

About five thousand marchers left the departments Colón and Atlántida as part of a nationwide convergence march in opposition to the coup d'état, planned to end simultaneously in Tegucigalpa and San Pedro Sula on 11 August.

Daniel Ordoñez Torres is murdered by his brother in law Humberto Almendarez in the community of La Venta. Humberto Almendarez asked his brother in law what he thought of the events that were occurring and Daniel Ordoñez told him that he thought that Mel had broken the law and was removed legally, that he (Torres) was not a member of any party, and that if he didn't work, he wouldn't eat (original (in Spanish) "que él no iba por ningún partido y que si no trabajaba no comía"). Humberto Almendarez became angry and pulled out a gun and shot Ordoñez, who died later at Hospital Escuela.

=== August 6 ===
It was reported that Hugo Chávez had made payments to ambassadors of Honduras.

While "energetically" condemning Zelaya's ouster, the US State Department decided not to impose further sanctions on Honduras (See July 7 for earlier aid cut-offs) and acknowledged that

President Zelaya's insistence on undertaking provocative actions contributed to the polarization of Honduran society and led to a confrontation that unleashed the events that led to his removal

=== August 9 ===
As part of a nationwide march organised by the Frente Nacional de Resistencia contra el Golpe de Estado en Honduras in opposition to the coup d'état, and planned to end as a convergence simultaneously in Tegucigalpa and San Pedro Sula on 11 August, about five thousand marchers who had left the departments Colón and Atlántida on 4 August arrived in El Progreso, Yoro, the town from which de facto President Roberto Micheletti originates. The marchers were welcomed by the local residents. About eight thousand marchers from the departments Ocotepeque, Lempira, Copán and Santa Bárbara are expected to converge with the five thousand from Colón and Atlántida on 11 August in San Pedro Sula, while marchers from other states converge in Tegucigalpa. The marchers demand the restoration of deposed President Manuel Zelaya and the establishment of a national constituent assembly. During a regional summit in Mexico, Obama reiterated his rejection of the coup and his desire to see democratic order restored to Honduras with Zelaya's return to power.

=== August 10 ===
Honduras reimposed a night-time curfew on the capital Tegucigalpa that had been lifted less than two weeks ago, after violent incidents flared around the city. Radio stations said police were deployed to disperse the protesters, who had gathered for the biggest show of support for Zelaya since his first aborted attempt to return to the country on July 5. The Organization of American States (OAS) planned to send a delegation of Latin American foreign ministers to Honduras late next week or early the following week to press for a negotiated solution to the crisis. Meanwhile, a group of 15 US lawmakers called on President Barack Obama to freeze the accounts of Honduras's interim leaders and ban them from entering the United States."We ask that you instruct the Treasury Department to freeze the bank accounts and assets of individuals involved in the coup, and deny them entry into the United States", Obama's fellow Democratic lawmakers wrote in a letter dated August 7 but released today. "It is clear that further action is necessary to ensure that democracy is restored and the civil rights of Honduras's citizens are respected."

=== August 11 ===
The OAS delegation was prevented from arriving, as intended, in order to negotiate the restitution of the democratically elected president. A day of action was marked by the culmination of the national convergent march from different parts of the country to Tegicigalpa and San Pedro Sula. One branch of the national convergent march organised by Frente Nacional de Resistencia contra el Golpe de Estado en Honduras arrived in Tegucigalpa. At a press conference, which among others included Manuel Zelaya's wife Xiomara de Zelaya and his daughter Hortencia Zelaya, a labour organiser, Israel Salinas, said that the National Resistance Front would "strengthen and deepen resistance actions throughout the national territory and intensify appeals for international solidarity". Salinas said that the organising process for November 2009 elections under Micheletti's de facto government was illegal and that the National Resistance Front will pursue those responsible for the coup in international legal institutions. The demonstration included teachers, trade union members from the Bloque Popular and former Cabinet ministers of the Zelaya presidency. Leaders of the protest estimate the crowd at 40,000 protesters. In San Pedro Sula one source estimated th crowd at 10,000 protesters. There was significant international support for this day of action. The de facto government reimposed a night-time curfew on Tegucigalpa: "In response to disturbances late today in the capital city, a curfew will be in place", said a government statement, which barred vehicular or pedestrian traffic from 10:00 pm (0400 GMT) to 5:00 am (1100 GMT).

CONATEL (Comisión Nacional de Telecomunicaciones ) notified Radio Globo, a nationwide radio station that broadcasts information about the activities of those supporting the return of Zelaya, that it was ordered closed for a month. Its lawyers promised to appeal the decision, and the station remains on the air for now.

The de facto government claimed that Interpol had issued red notice arrest orders for 2 Zelaya Ministers, and one Zelaya functionary. La Tribuna reported that red notice warrants were out for Rebeca Santos, Finance Minister, Aristides Mejia, Minister Vice President, and Rixi Moncada, director of the Electrical Energy company (ENEE), but no such notices were available on the Interpol website.

=== August 12 ===
About 10,000 protesters of the National Resistance Front (Frente Nacional de Resistencia) marched from the Teaching University to the central park of Tegucigalpa, where they were dispersed by tear gas. La Prensa alleges that a group of protesters beat the Vice President of the Congress, Ramón Velázquez, who had just left his office. According to the Associated Press, a group of demonstrators assaulted Ramon Velazquez, but he said he wasn't hurt: "The police and soldiers rescued me from the assailants. They didn't do me much harm." Police said 55 demonstrators were arrested during the clashes and 40 others were detained at a teachers college where Zelaya's loyalists have been sleeping. Protest leaders criticized the raid on the college campus: "We condemn and repudiate the police action of entering (the college) and taking our companions, firing tear gas canisters at people who were resting", protest leader Juan Barahona said. "This is repression."

=== August 13 ===
Around 5,000 Zelaya supporters protested outside the offices of federal investigators, seeking information on pro-Zelaya demonstrators arrested the previous day.

=== August 17 ===
Zelaya's wife Xiomara Castro led a peaceful march of several thousand through the streets of the capital.

=== August 19 ===
Amnesty International released a report on human rights violations since the coup d'état, describing the general pattern of human rights violations and specific incidents of police violence against peaceful protesters during a demonstration on 30 July and against detained protesters.

Several thousand protest outside the US embassy in the capital demanding a tougher stand against the Mecheletti government. Later a convoy of 1000 cars drove slowly across the city, sounding their horns and shouting slogans, in support of Zelaya

=== August 20 ===
Unión Cívica Democrática filed a complaint to the Inter-American Commission on Human Rights concerning Zelaya's and his followers' violence and hate campaigns in Honduras.

=== August 21 ===
In an open letter, 93 United States university professors and others criticised Human Rights Watch (HRW) for not publishing statements and reports about Honduras since HRW's 8 July press release, stating that HRW had not "raised the alarm over the extra-judicial killings, arbitrary detentions, physical assaults, and attacks on the press — many of which have been thoroughly documented — that have occurred in Honduras, in most cases by the coup regime against the supporters of the democratic and constitutional government of Manuel Zelaya." The scholars claimed that the Obama administration was supporting the de facto Roberto Micheletti government, by providing "aid money through the Millennium Challenge Account and other sources" and by training Honduran military students at the School of the Americas, and that the Obama administration was ignoring Honduras' human rights situation. The scholars appealed to HRW to make a strong statement concerning the human rights violations and to conduct its own independent investigation into them.

=== August 24 ===
The head of the Organization of American States, Jose Miguel Insulza, flew to Honduras with seven foreign ministers to persuade the post-coup government to accept a proposal to reinstall ousted President Manuel Zelaya. The United States emphasized its backing of the mission by supplying it with a C-17 aircraft to fly the delegation from Miami to an airbase near the Honduran capital Tegucigalpa.

== September 2009 ==
=== September 21 ===
BBC News reported that Zelaya returned to the interior of Honduras for the first time since July 26, quoting officials and Venezuelan president Chavez, who stated that he was in a UN building in Tegucigalpa. Reuters confirms that Zelaya is housed in the Brazilian embassy. Thousands of supporters surrounded the building but Honduras's de facto rulers imposed a curfew from 4:00 pm until 6:00 am to maintain calm. In the evening the curfew was extended until 6:00 pm the next day.

=== September 22 ===
The Micheletti de facto government issued decree PCM-M-016-2009, which suspended five constitutional rights: personal liberty (Article 69), freedom of expression (Article 72), freedom of movement (Article 81), habeas corpus (Article 84) and freedom of association.

=== September 25 ===
David Romero Ellner, the head of pro-Zelaya Radio Globo, accused Jews of being a problem in Honduras and also said to his radio listeners that "I believe it should have been fair and valid to let Hitler finish his historic vision". Media and organizations like the Anti-Defamation League tied his remarks to the political crisis in Honduras.

=== September 28 ===
Decree PCM-M-016-2009 was used to shut down the television stations Channel 36 and Radio Globo. Two international journalists recording the raid on Radio Globo were allegedly beaten by the security forces.

=== September 29 ===
The Office of the Special Rapporteur for Freedom of Expression of the Inter-American Commission of Human Rights (IAHCR) "expressed its most energetic rejection" of PCM-M-016-2009 and asked for the immediate suspension of its enforcement, because according to the IACHR, it "flagrantly [contradicted] the international standards for freedom of expression".

== October 2009 ==
=== October 9 ===
U.N. human rights experts voiced concern at reports that former paramilitaries from Colombia had been recruited to protect wealthy people and property in Honduras after the military coup.

=== October 10 ===
Honduras' interim leaders put in place new rules that threaten broadcasters with closure for airing reports that "attack national security", further restricting media freedom following the closure of two opposition stations.

=== October 16 ===
Time magazine reports, "in the past three weeks, Micheletti has cracked down on civil rights, shuttered pro-Zelaya broadcasters and decreed that more media will be muzzled if they 'transmit messages that incite national hate.' Micheletti, a devout Roman Catholic who has said he's on a calling from God, lifted many of his emergency decrees during a visit last week by U.S. Congresswoman Ileana Ros-Lehtinen, the ranking Republican on the House Foreign Affairs Committee and a Micheletti supporter. But human-rights groups like Amnesty International say police and soldiers are still blocking street protests."

=== October 17 ===
Daniel Ortega hinted that the "Resistance" is searching for weapons and training centers. Hugo Chávez said "I'm just warning ... no one to be surprised if there is an armed movement in the mountains of Honduras".

=== October 19 ===
The Micheletti de facto government decree PCM-M-016-2009 that had suspended five constitutional rights since 22 September was rescinded in La Gaceta.

=== October 21 ===
Roberto Micheletti's caretaker government imposed restrictions on street protests, which are mainly pro-Zelaya. Honduran police announced restrictions on protests, saying they must be authorized by the government 24 hours in advance with a request detailing the people in charge and the time and route the march will take, in an effort to quell near daily rallies in favor of Zelaya.

=== October 30 ===
The OAS announced that representatives from both Micheletti and Zelaya had reached an agreement that would place the decision to restore Zelaya to the presidency in the hands of the National Congress.

Zelaya, speaking in the capital Tegucigalpa, expressed his "satisfaction and optimism" at the deal, which he said heralded the return of democracy to Honduras. The Honduran Congress is expected to vote on the deal within the next few days, after a non-binding ruling by the country's Supreme Court. It is hoped the deal will restore calm to the streets of Tegucigalpa, where security forces once again used batons and tear gas against Zelaya supporters this week. Zelaya supporter Rafael Alegria, leader of the Via Campesina movement, said several had been injured and at least ten detained.

=== October 31 ===
Zelaya declared that he hopes he will be back in office by November 5, the deadline for the two sides to establish a power-sharing government. "By Thursday, the government of national unity should be installed", he said in a meeting broadcast by Radio Globo. "By that day, point No. 5 has to be resolved", he added, referring to the clause of the agreement that covers his return to office. In fact, the accord does not establish a firm deadline by which Congress has to make a final decision on Zelaya's reinstatement, Organization of American States Political Affairs Secretary Victor Rico noted following Zelaya's comments. "There is no timeframe for Zelaya to return to office", he said. "Only Congress can make that determination."

== November 2009 ==
=== November 1 ===
U.S. Secretary of Labor Hilda Solis and Chilean former president Ricardo Lagos were named to the commission tasked with monitoring the creation of a power-sharing government in Honduras, under the U.S.-brokered agreement to end the nation's 4-month-old political crisis. The Micheletti representative will be Arturo Corrales, previously of his negotiating commission and Zelaya has named Jorge Arturo Reina, his UN representative.

=== November 3 ===
National Congress President José Alfredo Saavedra called a meeting of the executive council of Congress so that they could know the text of the accord and begin contemplating how to proceed. Saavedra urged people not to put pressure on Congress at this time.

The executive council of the National Congress decided to seek the opinions of the Supreme Court, National Commissioner for Human Rights, the Attorney General's office and the Public Ministry. The Tegucigalpa-San Jose Agreement states that, by November 5, the government of Unity and National Reconciliation would be formed. The Honduran daily Tiempo contends this implicitly put the same term to Congress, and that the actions of the executive council make it impossible to comply materially with this deadline. Deputy Erick Rodriguez described the actions as a delaying tactic, since the agreement only tacitly mentions consulting the Supreme Court; he proposed that since this is a political issue no consultations be made and that the Congress proceed immediately to a vote on the issue.

Micheletti representative Vilma Morales stated that Micheletti aims to lead the Government of National Unity until Congress decides on the return of Zelaya. In a letter to Zelaya, Micheletti asked for a list of ten citizens to integrate into the Government. A similar letter was sent to the five presidential election candidates. Morales said that in the election of the members of the unity government "there must be an exchange of views on everything in order to produce a balance and that it comply with what is the reconciliation of the text and content of the accord." Zelaya indicated that he interprets the accord to mean that he should be the head of that unity government.

=== November 4 ===
Zelaya asks the Obama Administration to explain why, after pressing for his reinstatement, U.S. officials say they will recognize upcoming Honduran elections even if he isn't returned to power first. In a letter sent to the U.S. State Department, Zelaya asked Secretary of State Hillary Clinton "to clarify to the Honduran people if the position condemning the coup d'état has been changed or modified." His request came after Washington's top envoy to Latin America, Thomas Shannon, told CNN en Español that the U.S. will recognize the November 29 elections even if the Honduran Congress decides against returning Zelaya to power.

=== November 5 ===
Former Chilean President Ricardo Lagos, a member of the verification commission, said that the different interpretations given to the document in that country were hindering compliance. Lagos also emphasized that the President, Roberto Micheletti, should resign before the elections scheduled for 29 November and that the deposed president Manuel Zelaya must be returned in office before the election.

=== November 6 ===
Zelaya decided not to give a list of candidates for the unity government to Micheletti, arguing that the Congress was unacceptably delaying the agreed-upon vote on his restoration.

Micheletti subsequently announced the formation of the government of national unity and reconciliation and said it was "representative of a large ideological and political spectrum in our country and complied strictly with the agreement". When Micheletti announced he had formed the unity government without input from Zelaya, Zelaya declared the agreement "dead".

Department of State spokesperson Ian Kelly characterized the decision of Micheletti to go ahead without Zelaya's contribution as "unilateral", and said that the State Department was "disappointed that both sides are not following this very clear path" with "the unilateral statements made last night, which do not serve the spirit of the Tegucigalpa-San Jose Accord."

The Spanish Government said that it considered the creation of a unity government in Honduras without representatives of the ousted president Manuel Zelaya "a flagrant breach of the agreement" that the 'de facto' president Micheletti and Zelaya signed in order to end the political crisis. "It seems clear that a government of national unity and reconciliation, without agreement, is a Government that is a mere continuation of the situation following the coup", the Spanish Secretary of State said.

Press Secretary René Zepeda read a press release in which the Micheletti government exhorted Zelaya to "take up the accord again to achieve national unity and reconciliation", extending the time frame for Zelaya to send his list of candidates for the unity government through the weekend.

=== November 7 ===
The President of Costa Rica, Óscar Arias, said that the government never had the will to resolve the political crisis arising from the coup of June 28 against President Manuel Zelaya. "I am not surprised, because I found the same inflexibility [by Micheletti] in the talks here in San Jose." He said he felt "that they are only seeking through delaying tactics that time pass and that the elections (of the next 29th of November) come, risking, yes, that the future Government not be recognized by some countries."

=== November 10 ===
U.S. Deputy Assistant Secretary of State Craig A. Kelly, who helped broker the Tegucigalpa-San José accord two weeks ago, arrived in Honduras to help revive the moribund pact through public statements and private meetings with the two parties to the agreement.

=== November 14 ===
Ousted Honduran President Manuel Zelaya insisted that he will not accept any deal to restore him to office if it means he must recognize elections later this month.

Panamanian president Ricardo Martinelli announced that Panamá will recognize the winner of the November 29 elections in Honduras, and asked the international community to do the same.

=== November 17 ===
Congressional leader Jose Alfredo Saavedra said that Honduran lawmakers will not decide whether to restore ousted President Manuel Zelaya until after upcoming presidential elections.

=== November 19 ===
Micheletti said that he may step down temporarily to allow voters to concentrate on the upcoming presidential elections. He said would consult his advisers and those who have supported his government on whether he should step aside ahead of the November 29 election and until at least December 2, when Congress is scheduled to vote on whether to reinstate ousted President Manuel Zelaya.

=== November 26 ===
The Honduran Supreme Court recommended that Congress vote against restoring ousted President Manuel Zelaya, another blow for his quickly fading chances of returning to power. La Prensa in Honduras reported that the Supreme Court was unable to comment on the restitution because of pending charges against Zelaya.

A bomb partially exploded in an intercity bus. It may have been an attempt to disrupt the electoral process.

=== November 27 ===
Costa Rica promised Friday to restore ties with Honduras if its presidential elections are clean, joining other nations in rejecting ousted President Manuel Zelaya's insistence that recognizing the vote would legitimize a June coup. More than 50 members of the British parliament and others urged governments, including the Obama administration, to not recognise the elections on 29 November under the military coup regime.

=== November 29 ===
Despite threats from various international actors to not recognize the results of the elections, Hondurans went to the polls to elect a new president. Early returns indicate that conservative Porfirio Lobo was elected with around 55% of the votes. Initial official numbers for the turnout of the election place it at around 60%, The true figure was just under 50%.

=== November 30 ===
Colombia's conservative President Álvaro Uribe joined a list of leaders that are supporting the next Honduran government. "Colombia recognizes the next government", Uribe told reporters during an Ibero-American summit in Portugal. "A democratic process has taken place in Honduras with high participation, without fraud." Others at the Summit rejected the elections. Foreign Minister Bruno Rodriguez Parrilla, head of the Cuban delegation at the 19th Ibero-American Summit in Portugal, demanded the adoption of a declaration rejecting the Honduran elections held under a dictatorship in Honduras established through a military coup with the encouragement and support of the United States. "If we recognize the spurious government that emerges from this election, we would betray the principles of peace, democracy and justice we defend, and this Summit should take a stand in this respect."

== December 2009 ==
=== December 1 ===
The member countries of the Bolivarian Alliance for the Peoples of Our America (ALBA) said on Tuesday that they do not recognize the "illegal and illegitimate" elections held on Sunday in Honduras. The ALBA countries also warned the international community that the fact of recognizing these elections "would be an unfortunate precedent that would endanger the stability and existence of democracy" in the region. They support the efforts carried out by the government of ousted President Manuel Zelaya in urging international organizations to "bring to justice the masterminds and perpetrators of the coup d'état and those responsible for human rights violation and political persecution in Honduras."

=== December 2 ===
Honduran lawmakers debated ousted President Manuel Zelaya's future Wednesday under international pressure to reinstate him or face more isolation, despite an election that has chosen his successor. Lawmakers from Lobo's conservative National Party said they would vote the same way they did on June 28, when Congress kicked Zelaya out of office. "I believe we are going to ratify what we decided on June 28, National Party lawmaker Johnny Handal told The Associated Press as the session was starting. Congressional President Jose Alfredo Saavedra, of the Liberal Party, insisted he felt no pressure from abroad, saying he had met with diplomats of many countries and none had suggested he vote one way the other. "Congress has not been the object of pressure of any nature", Saavedra told Channel 5. "Nobody, absolutely nobody, has dared to insinuate what the route should be." Saavedra said that lawmakers must consider extensive opinions submitted by the Supreme Court and other institutions and the discussion could last until at least the following Friday.

Later that day, Honduras' Congress overwhelmingly voted against reinstating President Manuel Zelaya. After a 10-hour debate, lawmakers voted 111-14 not to return the leftist leader to power for the remainder of his term, which ends 27 January 2010, as Washington and many Latin American governments had urged. The vote was part of a U.S.-brokered deal to end the crisis. It left restoring Zelaya up to Congress. Zelaya, who listened to the proceedings from his refuge in the Brazilian Embassy, said even before the vote that he wouldn't return for a token two months if asked. He said he should have been reinstated before the presidential election and urged governments not to restore ties with the incoming administration of Porfirio Lobo. "Today, the lawmakers at the service of the dominant classes ratified the coup d'état in Honduras", Zelaya said in a statement released shortly after the vote. "They have condemned Honduran to exist outside the rule of law.".

=== December 4 ===
Officials have revised the turnout for the election down to 49% (from the previously announced 60%) which is a decline on the 55% 2005 election turnout.

Honduran activists led by Juan Barahona ended five months of daily protests demanding the reinstatement Zelaya and said that they're moving on now that Congress has voted to keep Manuel Zelaya out of office. Barahona, who has been leading protests since late June when Zelaya was forced out of the country, said that his supporters are "closing that chapter" of their struggle. Barahona said it's time for Hondurans who support policies in favor of the poor and other themes that Zelaya espoused to shift their focus to the 2014 elections.

The Latin American Parliament voted to suspend the Central American country's congress from its ranks as punishment for the coup. "It saddens us a great deal that it had to come to this", said parliament representative Maria Augusta Calle, of Ecuador.

A top Brazilian official has signaled that Latin America's largest nation may recognize the Honduran candidate who won last weekend's post-coup presidential election. Dilma Rousseff, chief of staff for Brazilian President Luiz Inácio Lula da Silva, said that the Central American country's recent elections should be considered separately from the 28 June coup that ousted ex-President Manuel Zelaya.

=== December 9 ===
Zelaya planned to leave the Brazilian Embassy in Honduras to travel to Mexico, but decided to remain there when the Honduran government said he could go only as a private citizen requesting political asylum, conditions that would bar him from any political activity and would in essence require Zelaya to concede he is no longer president.

=== December 11 ===
Brazil said that Zelaya must leave the embassy by January 27.

EFE reports, along with many other sources, that Porfirio Lobo Sosa and Manuel Zelaya Rosales have agreed to meet Monday to try to put an end to the political crisis in Honduras, announced Dominican President Leonel Fernández. The meeting will take place in Santo Domingo in the Dominican Republic, President Fernández said.

The decapitated body of Santos Corrales Garcia was found. The chairman of the Committee for the Defense of Human Rights in Honduras (CODEH), Andres Pavon, denounced on Saturday that police killed a supporter of ousted President Manuel Zelaya. Pavon said he was arrested on the afternoon of December 5 by five people dressed in uniforms of the National Directorate of Criminal Investigation (DNIC) with Galil rifles and 9mm pistols and transported Tacoma in a blue vehicle.

=== December 13 ===
Walter Trochez was shot as he walked in downtown Tegucigalpa. Friends rushed him to a hospital, where he died. National Resistance Front said "Trochez was an active militant in the resistance and an example of the fight against the dictatorship." A Honduran rights group said Trochez was briefly kidnapped Dec. 4 by four masked men who beat him. The assailants threatened to kill Trochez because of his participation in the anti-coup movement, the International Observatory on the Human Rights Situation said. He was also a gay rights activist.

=== December 16 ===
Sixteen-year-old Catherine Nicolle Rodriguez, daughter of Honduran journalist Karol Cabrera, is assassinated. She was pregnant and doctors were able to save the baby, but the baby remained in critical condition. Others receive injuries. Karol Cabrara is known for publicly supporting Micheletti. The Resistance is suspected of the assassination. This was denied by the head of National Bureau of Criminal Investigation (DNIC), Francisco Murillo López who said it arose from a problem in the bar of, the soccer team from the capital, Olimpia and Motagua.

== January 2010 ==
=== January 20 ===
The Dominican Republic and President-elect Porfirio Lobo agreed to a deal that would allow Zelaya to be transported safely from the Brazilian embassy in Tegucigalpa where he had been, to the Dominican Republic upon Lobo taking office on January 27. Lobo stated that he would ensure Zelaya would leave safely and "with dignity". Lobo negotiated with Dominican President Leonel Fernández. Lobo also discussed the situation with former presidential candidates who signed a statement on the agreement, as well as requesting that sanctions placed against Honduras as a result of the incident be lifted.

=== January 21 ===
Zelaya agreed to the deal between the Dominican Republic and Porfirio Lobo for safe conduct as a "guest" out of Honduras, calling it a "good gesture" on the part of Lobo, while a close advisor said he would remain political active and hope to later return to political activity.

=== January 26 ===
In a press briefing, US Assistant Secretary of State Philip Crowley reported that that morning, a delegation from Washington, including Assistant Secretary for Western Hemisphere Affairs Arturo Valenzuela, his Principal Deputy Craig Kelly, and Assistant Secretary for Economic and Business Affairs Jose Fernandez departed Washington for Tegucigalpa where they would observe the inauguration of a new president in Honduras the following day.

=== January 27 ===
The crisis drew to a close with the inauguration of newly elected president Porfirio Lobo and a deal to allow Zelaya to leave the Brazilian embassy into exile in the Dominican Republic.

== May 2011 ==
=== May 28 ===
A deal was made to allow Zelaya to return to Honduras in May 2011. He did so on May 28, 2011. In June, the OAS was to vote on Honduras' return to the body.

== See also ==
- Law Library of Congress report on the 2009 Honduran constitutional crisis
