= UCD =

UCD can refer to:

== Education ==
- University College Dublin, Irish university
  - University College Dublin A.F.C., the university's association football club
  - University College Dublin RFC, the university's rugby union club
  - UCD GAA, the university Gaelic games club
- University of California, Davis

== Science and technology ==
- User-centered design
- Use case diagram
- Urine collection device
- Ultra compact dwarf galaxy
- Unicode Character Database

== Other ==
- Unión Cívica Democrática
- Union of the Democratic Centre (disambiguation), party name in various countries
- Union of the Democratic Centre (Spain)
- Union of the Democratic Centre (Argentina)
