= Guaymuras =

Guaymuras may refer to

- Guaimura
- The agreement reached to end the 2009 Honduran constitutional crisis
