= Democratic Centre =

Democratic Centre or Democratic Center may refer to:

- Democratic Centre (Colombia)
- Democratic Centre (Croatia)
- Democratic Center (Ecuador)
- Democratic Centre (France)
- Democratic Centre (Italy)
- Democratic Centre (Latvia), existed during the 1920s and 1930s
- Democratic Center Party of Latvia, existed during the 1990s
- Democratic Centre (North Macedonia) (est. 2002)
- Democratic Centre (Serbia)
- Democratic Centre of Boka, Montenegro
- Democratic Center Party of Mexico
- Democratic Centre Union (Switzerland)
- Union of the Democratic Centre (Spain)
- Democratic Center Party (Turkey)

== See also ==
- Union of the Democratic Centre (disambiguation)
- Democrat (disambiguation)
- Center (disambiguation)
