= Civic Democratic Union =

Civic Democratic Union may refer to:

- Civic Democratic Union (Slovakia) (Občianska demokratická únia), former political party in Slovakia
- Unión Cívica Democrática, a political movement in Honduras
