= Union of the Centre =

Union of the Centre may refer to:

- Union of the Centre (1993), a former centre-right liberal party in Italy
- Union of the Centre (2002), a Christian democratic party in Italy
- Union of the Centre (France), a term for a centrist political alliance starting in the 2020 local elections

== See also ==
- Centre Union (disambiguation)
- Union of the Democratic Centre (disambiguation)
