= International reaction to the 2009 Honduran coup d'état =

International reaction to the 2009 Honduran coup d'état of June 28, 2009, was that the coup was widely repudiated around the globe. The United Nations, every other country in the Western Hemisphere (except Honduras itself) and others, publicly condemned the military-led 2009 Honduran coup d'état and ouster of Honduran President Manuel Zelaya as illegal and most labelled it a coup d'état. The Obama administration, along with all other governments in the hemisphere, branded the action a "coup." Every country in the region, except the United States, withdrew their ambassadors from Honduras. All ambassadors of the European Union were recalled. Venezuela said it would suspend oil shipments, and Honduras's neighbors — El Salvador, Guatemala and Nicaragua - stopped overland trade for 48 hours. The World Bank and Inter-American Development Bank suspended lending to Honduras.

President Barack Obama of the United States said, "We believe that the coup was not legal and that President Zelaya remains the President of Honduras." Amongst the stronger reactions, the President of Venezuela Hugo Chávez pledged to "bring down" any replacement government. International organizations such as the Organization of American States, Mercosur, and the Bolivarian Alternative for the Americas also condemned the events. No foreign government recognized de facto President Roberto Micheletti.

== Countries ==
- Antigua and Barbuda: Prime Minister Baldwin Spencer issued a statement denouncing Zelaya's removal. "It was with shock and dismay that I received news of the forced removal of President Zelaya and the kidnapping of Foreign Affairs Minister Patricia Rodas and the temporary detention and mistreatment of the Venezuelan, Cuban and Nicaraguan Ambassadors." Spencer voiced his support for OAS Resolution 953, the ALBA condemnation of the coup d'état, and called for the immediate and unconditional reinstatement of President Zelaya. He also called upon the international community to reject the coup.
- Argentina: Argentine President Cristina Fernández de Kirchner said: "I'm deeply worried about the situation in Honduras. It reminds us of the worst years in Latin America's history. We will demand that the OAS (Organization of American States) fully comply with the democratic charter that requires unconditional respect for democracy and, above all, the restoration of the Honduran president. I do not hesitate to call this a return to barbarity. All countries of the continent and the entire international community should demand the return of the democratically elected president." On August 12, 2009, Argentine organizers said the Honduran military would no longer be welcome at an upcoming meeting of regional military leaders because of its role in the coup.
- Belarus: Ministry of Foreign Affairs Press Secretary Andrei Popov condemned the coup at a ministry press conference: "We vigorously condemn the violent upheaval of the legitimately elected President of Honduras by a group of people and his exile from the country.. ..We hope for the immediate reversion of the situation in Honduras into a legal framework and for unconditional respect by this country of its international commitments, including relevant articles of the Vienna Convention concerning security guaranties of the diplomatic staff."
- Belize: In a statement released June 29, 2009, the Government of Belize condemned the actions of the Honduran military, calling Zelaya "the only constitutional President of Honduras". The statement demanded his reinstatement, return to the rule of law and restoration of democracy.
- Bolivia: Evo Morales, President of Bolivia, condemned the military action. "To allow people to participate and decide the future of their country through their vote, it is not possible that some groups ignore this, including the military.".
- Brazil: Brazilian President Luiz Inácio Lula da Silva condemned the coup, called it "unacceptable", and averred Zelaya's return was a condition of continued relations with his country. Celso Amorim, Brazilian Minister of External Relations issued a press release "strongly condemning the military action that resulted in the ousting of the President of Honduras", urging his "immediate and unconditional return to power", and expressing "solidarity with the Honduran people." The Brazilian ambassador to Honduras, on vacation in Brazil, was ordered not to return to Honduras. On 21 September 2009, Zelaya took refuge at the Brazilian embassy in Tegucigalpa. On 24 September, Brazil called an emergency meeting of the United Nations Security Council to ensure the safety of its embassy in Honduras. Amorim told the Security Council that "since the day it has sheltered President Zelaya at its premises, the Brazilian Embassy has been virtually under siege" and that "it has been submitted to acts of harassment and intimidation by the de facto authorities". The UN Security Council defended the inviolability of the Brazilian embassy and "called upon the de facto government of Honduras to cease harassing the Brazilian embassy and to provide all necessary utilities and services, including water, electricity, food and continuity of communications". Brazil announced it would not recognize the winner of Honduras' election on November 29, 2009.
- Canada: Peter Kent, the Minister of State of Foreign Affairs (Americas), stated: "Canada condemns the coup d'état that took place over the weekend in Honduras, and calls on all parties to show restraint and to seek a peaceful resolution to the present political crisis..." Kent nonetheless stated that "[t]here has to be an appreciation of the events that led up to the coup" and admitted that Canadian military aid would continue to flow to Honduras, describing it as "not a major issue", and said that Canada would not be cutting the $16.4-million in development aid it provides each year.
- Chile: Chilean President Michelle Bachelet condemned the coup and referred to Zelaya as "legitimately elected by the people".
- China: Qin Gang, spokesperson for the Ministry of Foreign Affairs of the People's Republic of China, stated: "China expressed concern over the situations in Honduras and hopes it can regain stability as soon as possible." China has no formal diplomatic relations with Honduras, but is a permanent member of UN Security Council. When answering questions on their relations, Qin said the PRC government is willing to develop friendly, cooperative, normal relations with all countries under the principle of one-China, peaceful co-existence, as well as the UN Charter and related UN resolutions and principles.
- Colombia: The Colombian government released a four-point statement expressing profound concern over the break in constitutional order, rejected the removal by force of the democratically elected President Zelaya, called for the re-establishment of constitutional and legal order, and supported the actions of the OAS in its attempts to find democratic solutions for the crisis. President Álvaro Uribe officially stated that the Colombian Government would recognized the new President-elect Porfirio Lobo Sosa
- Costa Rica: In a joint press conference with Manual Zelaya, Costa Rican President Óscar Arias condemned the coup and said that it "indicates that democracy in Latin America and its institutions are fragile and vulnerable". Arias also said that Zelaya was personally in "good condition" and that Costa Rica was offering Zelaya "all the courtesies that he deserves".Currently the country and its president have been designated as neutral ground where the parts will meet on July 9 to negotiate an agreement.
- Cuba: The Cuban government condemned the coup d’état. Raúl Castro said that there should be no negotiations with the "golpistas" (coup-makers) and that Honduras has and should have only president; Manuel Zelaya. He also called the United States to act in accordance with its condemnation of the coup.
- Dominican Republic: "This coup d’état represents a step backwards because it violates the Democratic Charter of the Organization of American States (OAS)", said Leonel Fernández, President of the Dominican Republic.
- Ecuador: Rafael Correa, the President of Ecuador, said he would not recognize any new government in Honduras.
- El Salvador: "(The Government of El Salvador) asks for the immediate restoration of the constitutional president of Honduras, Manuel Zelaya", said Salvadoran President Mauricio Funes in a press conference. Funes also said that he had had a telephone conversation with Zelaya, in which he expressed "solidarity" with the deposed Honduran president. The Salvadoran Minister of Defense, David Munguía Payés, said that the Salvadoran military would reinforce three border crossings between El Salvador and Honduras.
- France: The French Foreign Ministry said in a statement: "France firmly condemns the coup that has just taken place in Honduras. The arrests and expulsions of diplomatic envoys are a grave breach of the Vienna Convention. They are unacceptable. The constitutional order must be restored at the earliest opportunity. France calls on all parties to act with respect for the principles and values of democracy."
- Germany: Foreign Minister Frank-Walter Steinmeier called the arrest and exile of President Zelaya "an act which violates the constitutional order of the Republic of Honduras. It is now vital for Honduras to swiftly return to law and order. I call upon the conflict parties to resume dialogue and to find a peaceful solution which takes due account of democracy and the rule of law."
- Guatemala: Guatemalan President Álvaro Colom said in a press conference that Guatemala "recognizes President Zelaya as the democratically chosen president". Colom said that he will discuss with fellow Central American presidents in Managua how to restore democracy in Honduras.
- Guyana: The Government of Guyana said it strongly condemned the coup in Honduras. A release from the Ministry of Foreign Affairs said the government also joined the call for the early reinstatement of Zelaya.
- Israel: The Concurrent Israeli Embassy for Guatemala and Honduras based in Guatemala City recognized Micheletti's Government on June 28 and recognized Honduran general election, 2009 in the following days the elections were held.
- Italy: Foreign Minister Franco Frattini released a statement calling the coup "a serious violation of law and democratic rules".
- Jamaica: Foreign Minister Dr Ken Baugh, who was also deputy prime minister, said the removal of Zelaya was in breach of the principles of respect for the rule of law, human rights and constitutional order: "The government of Jamaica maintains its full support for and recognition of President Zelaya and therefore calls for his immediate reinstatement."
- Japan: The Ministry of Foreign Affairs of Japan condemned the coup and said that initiatives taken by the international community, including the United Nations and the Organization of American States (OAS) should leading the parties to a solution based on the San Jose Accord as swiftly as possible.
- Mexico: The Mexican government condemned the arrest and forced exile of Zelaya to Costa Rica.
- Nicaragua: President of Nicaragua Daniel Ortega invited Zelaya to come to Nicaragua and attend the Central American Integration System presidents' meeting. "Come here. We are not going to recognize any spurious, post-coup government that installs itself in Honduras. We will not recognize it", Ortega said.
- Norway: The Norwegian Ministry of Foreign Affairs also condemned the coup, and called on the legally elected government of Manuel Zelaya to be re-instated immediately and for democracy to return in Honduras.
- Panama: The Panamanian government condemned the coup.
- Paraguay: President of Paraguay Fernando Lugo said that the coup participants belonged in prison.
- Peru: José Antonio García Belaúnde, the Foreign Minister of Peru, said that his government "strongly condemns" the coup and will push for the re-establishment of democracy in Honduras.
- Russia: A spokesman for the Russian Foreign Ministry condemned Zelaya's overthrow and called it a "gross violation of basic democratic norms." Russia also welcomed the efforts by regional organizations and groups trying "to work out a solution within the framework of international law."
- Sahrawi Arab Democratic Republic: The government of the Sahrawi Arab Democratic Republic condemned the coup and called on protagonists to restore the constitutional order "to avoid the country plunging into a spiral of political convulsions... We express our strong indignation at this excessive use of force against the power of the only legitimate president of Honduras, Manuel Zelaya, aiming at subjecting the country to a true constitutional crisis and serious tensions'.
- Spain: A spokesperson for Spanish Prime Minister José Luis Rodríguez Zapatero released the following statement: "The head of the government expressed his strongest condemnation for the illegal detention and expulsion of the constitutional president of the Republic of Honduras, Manuel Zelaya. The solution to any dispute must always be found through dialogue and respect for democratic rules. There is not, neither can there ever be, a solution to the Honduran crisis outside the country's constitutional framework."
- Switzerland: The Federal Department of Foreign Affairs issued a statement expressing its concern. It "urge[d] those responsible to re-establish constitutional order and the rule of law. It call[ed] for a democratic and peaceful resolution of the current crisis."
- Taiwan: Foreign Minister of the Republic of China Francisco Ou described the overthrow of President Zelaya as a "coup" which "violated the principles of democracy and the rule of law" and thus "should be censured" even though the Taiwanese embassy in Tegucigalpa had recognized Micheletti's government.
- United Kingdom: Chris Bryant, the British Under-Secretary of State for Foreign Affairs, said: "The UK condemns the expulsion of President Zelaya and calls for the restoration of democratic, constitutional government in Honduras. We support the Organisation of American States' call supporting the rule of law and are deeply concerned about the deployment of military personnel onto the streets of Tegucigalpa."
- United States: Following his ouster, the United States recognized President Manuel Zelaya as the only constitutional president of Honduras. "We believe that the coup was not legal and that President Zelaya remains the democratically elected president there", Obama said. Although U.S. officials characterized the events as a coup, suspended joint military operations and all non-emergency, non-immigrant visas, and cut off certain non-humanitarian aid to Honduras, they held back from formally designating Zelaya's ouster as a "military coup", which would have required them to cut off almost all aid to Honduras. The Obama administration's attempts to pressure Honduras into reversing the ouster of Zelaya were influenced by Republican minority party efforts to reach out to and advocate on behalf of the Micheletti government and defend the actions taken against Zelaya. In August 2009 the Law Library of Congress released an official analysis of the situation and concluded that "Available sources indicate that the judicial and legislative branches applied constitutional and statutory law in the case against President Zelaya in a manner that was judged by the Honduran authorities from both branches of the government to be in accordance with the Honduran legal system. However, removal of President Zelaya from the country by the military is in direct violation of the Article 102 of the Constitution, and apparently this action is currently under investigation by the Honduran authorities. After an agreement was reached between Micheletti and Zelaya, the United States signaled that it would recognize the 2009 Honduran elections, which it ultimately did, even after the framework of agreement broke down.
- Uruguay: Vice President of Uruguay Rodolfo Nin Novoa condemned the coup and called for the re-establishment of democratic order in Honduras.
- Venezuela: Venezuelan President Hugo Chávez called for Obama to speak out because the US "has a lot to do" with what happens in Honduras. A few hours later, Chavez threatened to use force and put his troops on high alert, saying he would do everything necessary to abort the coup in Honduras if anything were to happen to its embassy. He also warned that if a new government was sworn in he would "bring them down". Chávez, who has both attempted a coup in Venezuela and survived a coup, in May 2009 threatened to withdraw Venezuela from OAS, has argued that the OAS should suspend Honduras from the group.

== International organizations ==
- Association of Caribbean States The organisation condemned the coup in a statement and called for Zelaya's reinstatement. Additionally it stated, "we highlight our condemnation of the brutal treatment that Honduras military personnel gave to the Minister of Foreign Affairs, Patricia Rodas as well as the Ambassadors of Cuba, Nicaragua and Venezuela. This situation is a serious violation of International law, and the Vienna Convention on Diplomatic Relations."
- Bolivarian Alliance for the Americas The nine members of the organisation announced in a joint statement that they would not recognize any new government in Honduras.
- Caribbean: In a press release, CARICOM denounced the coup and voiced its concern over the treatment of Honduran and diplomatic officials during the coup. "The Caribbean Community condemns the military action which has interrupted the democratic process in Honduras and which contravenes the principles of the Inter-American Democratic Charter. The Community therefore calls for the immediate reinstatement of President Zelaya."
- Central American Bank for Economic Integration: Central America's development bank said it was provisionally freezing credit to Honduras.
- European Union: The European Union demanded a return to the constitutional order.
- Inter-American Development Bank (IADB): IADB President Luis Alberto Moreno stated that the IADB was pausing all new loans to Honduras until democracy was restored, adding: "We hope there is a way to return to democracy."
- Mercosur: President of Paraguay and current president pro tempore of Mercosur Fernando Lugo condemned the coup and said that no member state of Mercosur would recognize a Honduran government that was not led by Zelaya. Lugo also called for those behind the coup to receive prison sentences.
- Americas: The OAS called for an emergency meeting on Sunday, where it approved a resolution demanding "the immediate, safe and unconditional return of the constitutional president, Manuel Zelaya." Secretary-General José Miguel Insulza called the situation "a military coup." On July 1, 2009, the OAS "vehemently" condemned the removal of Zelaya and issued an ultimatum to Honduras's new government: Unless Mr. Zelaya is returned to power within 72 hours, the nation will be suspended from the group. Honduras withdrew from the group on July 4.
- South American Union: Chilean president Michelle Bachelet speaking on behalf of her government and Unasur condemned the coup and referred to Zelaya as "legitimately elected by the people".
- United Nations: A one-page resolution, passed by acclamation in the then 192-member body, condemned the removal of Mr. Zelaya as a coup and demanded his "immediate and unconditional restoration" as president. The resolution calls "firmly and categorically on all states to recognise no government other than that" of Mr Zelaya.
- The World Bank "paused" all lending for development programs to Honduras, said to be around $80 million for the next fiscal year. Asked under what conditions the World Bank would consider resuming lending to Honduras, World Bank President Robert Zoellick replied: "It is a situation that is in flux and fluid and in this case we are trying to play a supportive role with the region and its overall goals to restore democracy."
