= Centre Union (disambiguation) =

Centre Union may refer to:

- Centre Union, a former political party in Greece
- Centre Union – New Forces, a former political party in Greece
- Centre Union of Lithuania, a former political party in Lithuania

== See also ==
- Union of the Centre (disambiguation)
