= Beatriz Valle =

Honduran politician

Member of the National Congress of Honduras
- Incumbent
- Assumed office 25 January 2022
- President: Luis Redondo
- In office 25 January 2014 – 25 January 2018
- President: Mauricio Oliva
- Constituency: Francisco Morazán Department

Ambassador of Honduras to Canada
- In office 2006 – 2008
- President: Manuel Zelaya

Personal details
- Born: Delia Beatriz Valle Marichal; 2 November 1966 (age 60) Tegucigalpa, Honduras
- Party: Liberal (1998–2009; 2024–present); Liberty and Refoundation (2011–2022)
- Children: 1
- Education: National Autonomous University of Honduras
- Occupation: Dentist, diplomat, politician, presenter

Delia Beatriz Valle Marichal (born 2 November 1966) is a Honduran dentist, diplomat, politician, and television presenter. She has served as the ambassador of Honduras to Canada, vice chancellor of Foreign Affairs, and deputy in the National Congress for the Liberty and Refoundation party.

== Biography ==
Beatriz Valle was born into a wealthy family in Tegucigalpa on 2 November 1966. Her father was an engineer who was murdered, while her mother was a housewife. Her brother Guillermo Valle is also a politician, and is president of the Innovation and Unity Party. In 1982, she graduated from the Elvel Bilingual Institute. She has one daughter.

She completed her university studies in dentistry at the Faculty of Dentistry of the National Autonomous University of Honduras, where she graduated as a doctor of dental surgery in 1989. Later she traveled to Mexico accompanying her husband, but soon returned to Honduras due to pregnancy, and practiced dentistry for a short time.

For a while, she served as the ambassador of Honduras to Canada. In September 2008, President Manuel Zelaya appointed Valle vice chancellor of the Secretariat of Foreign Affairs. After the coup of 28 June 2009, she denounced an alleged persecution of Zeleaya's officials by the de facto government, and said that many functionaries had been forced to leave the country.

In the 2013 general election, she won a seat in the National Congress representing Francisco Morazán Department for the Liberty and Refoundation party.

In early 2016, Valle voted against the election processes of the Supreme Court six times. On social media, she created a great controversy by responding to a tweet from the United States ambassador, James D. Nealon, criticizing him for praising the election of the new magistrates, asking him to fight corruption and impunity, and insisting that there was a dictatorship in Honduras.

In July 2016, she presented a bill to ratify the referendum to conduct a popular consultation on the issue of presidential reelection.

In July 2016, she was denounced by businessman Vicente de Jesús Carrión for the alleged criminal offenses of insults and defamation, due to tweets in which she claimed that Carrión had been caught up in money laundering on 29 November 2015. The deputy reacted by protesting an attempt to censor her on social networks.

In 2017, she proposed legalizing the morning after pill for use in cases of rape, to prevent the victim from having to have the rapist's child.

In addition to politics, Valle enjoys singing, and in December 2016 she began hosting her own television program, Código abierto, on UNE TV.

== See also ==
- Chronology of the 2009 Honduran constitutional crisis
