= Guaimura =

Guaimura (or more commonly Guaymuras) refers to a name the Spanish gave to a part of Honduras. Columbus mentions a town named Guaymuras near Trujillo. Other common names for the territory now known as the country of Honduras included Honduras and Higueras. See the entry on Honduras for additional discussion.
