= David Romero Ellner =

Honduran journalist (died 2020)

David Romero Ellner (died 18 July 2020) was a Honduran journalist, lawyer, politician. He was director of Radio Globo and Globo TV. He was known for his investigations into corruption in the country and for sexually abusing his own daughter in 2002, a crime to which he pleaded guilty in 2004.

He died on 18 July 2020, from COVID-19 that he contracted in prison during the COVID-19 pandemic in Honduras. Earlier in 2020, CPJ and 190 other agencies urged world leaders to release all journalists imprisoned for their work due to the threat of incurring COVID-19 in prison.

== Convictions ==
In 2002, Romero Ellner was charged with raping his daughter. On 30 July 2002 he was stripped of his parliamentary immunity and office. In 2004, he pleaded guilty to raping his daughter and was sentenced to ten years in prison. He was released early, and the prosecutor who tried him has accused him of then embarking on a harassment campaign against her and her family, for which he was tried and found guilty on sixteen counts of libel and defamation in 2016. In January 2019, the Honduras Supreme Court upheld a previous conviction of the journalist; he charged a public prosecutor with corruption in 2016. On March 28, 2019, after exhausting all of his appeals, including the Supreme Court of Honduras and the Inter-American Commission on Human Rights, he was arrested by the National Honduran police in a raid on Radio Globo as he was on the air.
