= Guaymuras dialogue – Tegucigalpa/San José accord =

The Guaymuras dialogue – Tegucigalpa/San José accord is a diplomatic agreement made between two rival political factions in Honduras during the 2009 Honduran constitutional crisis. Representatives from the interim Micheletti government and deposed President Manuel Zelaya reached the agreement after several weeks of diplomatic dialogue in late around 2009

== Dialogue ==
The Guaymuras dialogue began after the failure of the San José accord to achieve a diplomatic solution to the 2009 Honduran constitutional crisis. The dialogue involved representatives from both Roberto Michelleti and Manuel Zelaya, and was facilitated initially by Oscar Arias.

== Agreement ==
On 30 October 2009, the Organization of American States announced that representatives from both Micheletti and Zelaya had reached an agreement that would place the decision to restore Zelaya to the presidency in the hands of the National Congress. The content and image of the signed accord was released to the public.

== Text of accord ==
Preamble

We, Honduran citizens, men and women convinced of the necessity to strengthen the state of law, to aid our constitution and the laws of our Republic, deepen democracy and assure a climate of peace and tranquility for our people, have carried out a frank and intense process of political dialogue to seek a negotiated and peaceful exit to the crisis in which our country has been submerged in recent months.

As fruit of this dialogue in which has predominated the wisdom, tolerance, and patriotic spirit of all the participants, we have drafted a political accord that will permit the reestablishment of civic harmony and assure a proper climate for democratic governability in our country. This accord, we are sure, will define the road to peace, reconciliation, and democracy, urgent demands of Honduran society.

The agreement on this accord demonstrates yet again, that Honduran men and women are capable of successfully carrying out dialogue and thanks to that and by means of it, reach the high goals that society demands and the country requires.

In virtue of the foregoing, we have agreed on the following accords:

=== The Government of National Reconciliation and Unity ===
To achieve reconciliation and strengthen democracy, we will form a Government of Unity and National Reconciliation made up of representatives of the various political parties and social organizations, recognized for their capabilities, honesty, aptness, and willingness to dialogue, who will occupy the distinct secretariates and subsecretariates, as well as other dependencies of State, in conformity with article 246 and following of the constitution of the Republic of Honduras.

In light of the fact that before the 28 of June, the Executive Power had not submitted a General Budget of Income and Expenses for consideration to the National Congress, in conformity with that established in article 205, number 32 of the Constitution of the Republic of Honduras, this government of unity and national reconciliation will respect and function on the basis of the general budget, recently approved by the National Congress for fiscal year 2009.

=== Renouncing the convocation of a National Constituent Assembly or reforming the unreformable articles of the Constitution ===
To achieve reconciliation and fortify democracy, we reiterate our respect for the Constitution and the laws of our country, abstaining from making calls for the convening of a National Constituent Assembly, in direct or indirect manner and renouncing also promoting or aiding any popular poll with the goal of reforming the Constitution in order to permit presidential re-election, modify the form of government or contravene any of the irreformable articles of our Magna Carta.

In particular, we will not make public declarations nor exercise any type of influence inconsistent with articles 5; 373 and 373 [sic: 374?] of the Constitution of the Republic of Honduras, and we reject energetically every manifestation contrary to the spirit of said articles and of the special law that regulates the referendum and the plebiscite.

=== The General Elections and the transfer of Government ===
To achieve reconciliation and fortify democracy, we reiterate that, in conformity with the articles 44 and 51 of the Constitution of the Republic of Honduras, the vote is universal, obligatory, egalitarian, direct, free and secret, and it corresponds to the Supreme Electoral Tribunal, with full autonomy and independence, to supervise and execute everything related to the electoral acts and processes.

At the same time, we make a call to the Honduran people to peacefully participate in the next general elections and to avoid all kinds of demonstrations that would oppose the elections or their results, or promote insurrection, antijuridical conduct, civil disobedience or other acts that could produce violent confrontations or transgressions of the law.

With the goal of demonstrating the transparency and legitimacy of the electoral process, we ask urgently that the Supreme Electoral Tribunal that it authorize and accredit the presence of international missions from now until the declaration of the results of the general elections, as well as the transfer of powers that will take place, in conformity with Article 237 of the Constitution of the Republic, the 27 of January 2010.

=== The Armed Forces and National Police ===
To reach reconciliation and fortify democracy, we affirm our will to comply in all its measures with article 272 of the Constitution of the Republic of Honduras, according to which the Armed Forces remain at the disposition of the Supreme Electoral Tribunal from one month before the general elections, for the purpose of guaranteeing the free exercise of suffrage, the custody, transparency, and guarding of the electoral materials and all the other aspects of security of the process. We reaffirm the professional, apolitical, obedient and non-deliberative character of the Honduran Armed Forces. In the same way, we agree that the national police should be strictly subject to that prescribed in its special legislation.

=== Executive Power ===
To achieve reconciliation and fortify democracy, in the spirit of the themes of the proposed San Jose Accord, both negotiating commissions have decided, respectfully, that the National Congress, as an institutional expression of popular sovereignty, in the use of its powers, in consultation with the points that the Supreme Court of Justice should consider pertinent and in conformity with the law, should resolve in that proceeding in respect to "return the incumbency of Executive Power to its state previous to the 28 of June until the conclusion of the present governmental period, the 27 of January of 2010". The decision that the National Congress adopts should lay the foundations to achieve social peace, political tranquility and governability that society demands and the country needs".

=== The Verification Commission and the Truth Commission ===
To achieve reconciliation and fortify democracy, we are disposed to the creation of a Commission of Verification of the promises assumed in this Accord, and of those that shall derive from it, coordinated by the Organization of American States (OAS). Said commission will be made up of two members of the international community and two members of the national community, these last will be sought one by each of the parties.

The Verification Commission will be charged with giving witness of the strict completion of all of the points of this Accord, and will receive for this the full cooperation of Honduran public institutions. Incompletion of any of the commitments contained in this Accord, proven and declared by the Verification Commission, will produce the activation of measures that the commission will establish against the transgressor or transgressors.

With the goal of clarifying the deeds that occurred before and after the 28 of June 2009, there will also be created a Truth Commission that will identify the acts that led to the present situation, and provide to the Honduran people elements to avoid that those deeds will be repeated in the future. This Commission of Dialogue recommends that the next Government, in the framework of a national consensus, constitutes the said Truth Commission in the first half of the year 2010.

=== The normalisation of relations of the Republic of Honduras with the International Community ===
On committing ourselves to faithfully comply with the promises assumed in the present Accord, we respectfully ask the immediate revocation of those measures and sanctions adopted at a bilateral or multilateral level, that in any manner would affect the reinsertion and full participation of the Republic of Honduras in the international community and its access to all forms of cooperation.

We make a call to the international community that it should reactivate as soon as possible the projects of cooperation in effect with the Republic of Honduras and continue with the negotiation of future ones. In particular, we ask urgently that, on the request of competent authorities the international cooperation be made effective that might be necessary and opportune for the Verification Commission and the future Truth Commission to assure the faithful completion and follow-through of the commitments acquired in this Accord.

=== Final Dispositions ===
Any difference in interpretation or application of the present Accord will be submitted to the Verification Commission, which will determine, in keeping with that disposed in the Constitution of the Republic of Honduras and in the legislation in effect and through an authentic interpretation of the present Accord, the solution that corresponds.

Taking into account that the present Accord is a product of the understanding and fraternity among Honduran men and women, we ask vehemently that the international community respect the sovereignty of the Republic of Honduras, and fully observe the time-honored principle in the Charter of the United Nations of non-interference in the internal affairs of other States.

=== Calendar of completion of the Accords ===
Given the immediate entrance into effect of this accord from the date of its signing, and with the goal of clarifying the timetable for completion and follow-through of the commitments acquired to reach national reconciliation, we agree on the following calendar of completion:

- 30 of October 2009

1. Signing and entry into effect of the accord. 2. Formal delivery of the accords to Congress for the effects of point 5, of "Executive Power".

- 2 of November 2009

1. Appointment of the Verification Commission

- Beginning with the signing of the present Accord and no later than the 5 of November

1. Appointment and installation of the Government of Unity and National Reconciliation

- 27 of January 2010

1. Celebrate the transfer of government

- First half of 2010

1. Formation of the Truth Commission

=== Final Declaration ===
In the name of reconciliation and the patriotic spirit that has convened us at the table of dialogue, we commit to complete in good faith the present Accord and that which derives from it.

The world is witness to that demonstration of unity and peace, to which we commit our civic conscience, and patriotic devotation. Together, we shall know to demonstrate our valor and determination to fortify the State of Law and construct a tolerant, pluralistic, and democratic society.

We sign the present Accord in the city of Tegucigalpa, Honduras, the 30th of October 2009.

=== Acknowledgement ===
We take advantage of the occasion to thank the accompaniment of the good offices of the international community, in particular the OAS, and its Secretary General, Jose Miguel Insulza, the Missions of Chancellors of the Hemisphere; the President of Costa Rica, Oscar Arias Sanchez; the ultimate government of the United States, its president Barack Obama; and its Secretary of State, Hillary Clinton.

=== The entry into effectiveness of the Tegucigalpa/San Jose Accord ===
For internal effects, the Accord has full effectiveness from its signing.

For effects of protocol and ceremony, there will be carried out a public act of signing on the 2nd of November 2009.

== Failure of the accord ==
Micheletti asked Zelaya to provide him with a list of candidates from which Micheletti could select members of a unity government. Zelaya chose not to give a list of candidates, arguing that he himself should be at the head of any unity government; several of the other parties did submit names for consideration. Zelaya also stated that the Congress was unacceptably delaying the agreed-upon vote on his restoration.

Zelaya had hoped to be back in office by November 5, the deadline for the two sides to establish a power-sharing government. "By Thursday, the government of national unity should be installed", he said in a meeting broadcast by Radio Globo. "By that day, point No. 5 has to be resolved", he added, referring to the clause of the agreement that covers his return to office. In fact, the accord did not establish a firm deadline by which Congress has to make a final decision on Zelaya's reinstatement, Organization of American States Political Affairs Secretary Victor Rico noted following Zelaya's comments. "There is no timeframe for Zelaya to return to office", he said. "Only Congress can make that determination."

When Micheletti announced he had formed what he called the unity government without input from Zelaya, Zelaya declared the agreement "dead" early on November 6. Diplomats from the United States then attempted to revive the pact, through public statements and private meetings with the two parties. Zelaya insisted that he would not accept any deal to restore him to office if it meant that he had to recognize the elections as a prerequisite of returning to power.

== See also ==
- 2009 Honduran constitutional crisis
