= Unión Cívica Democrática =

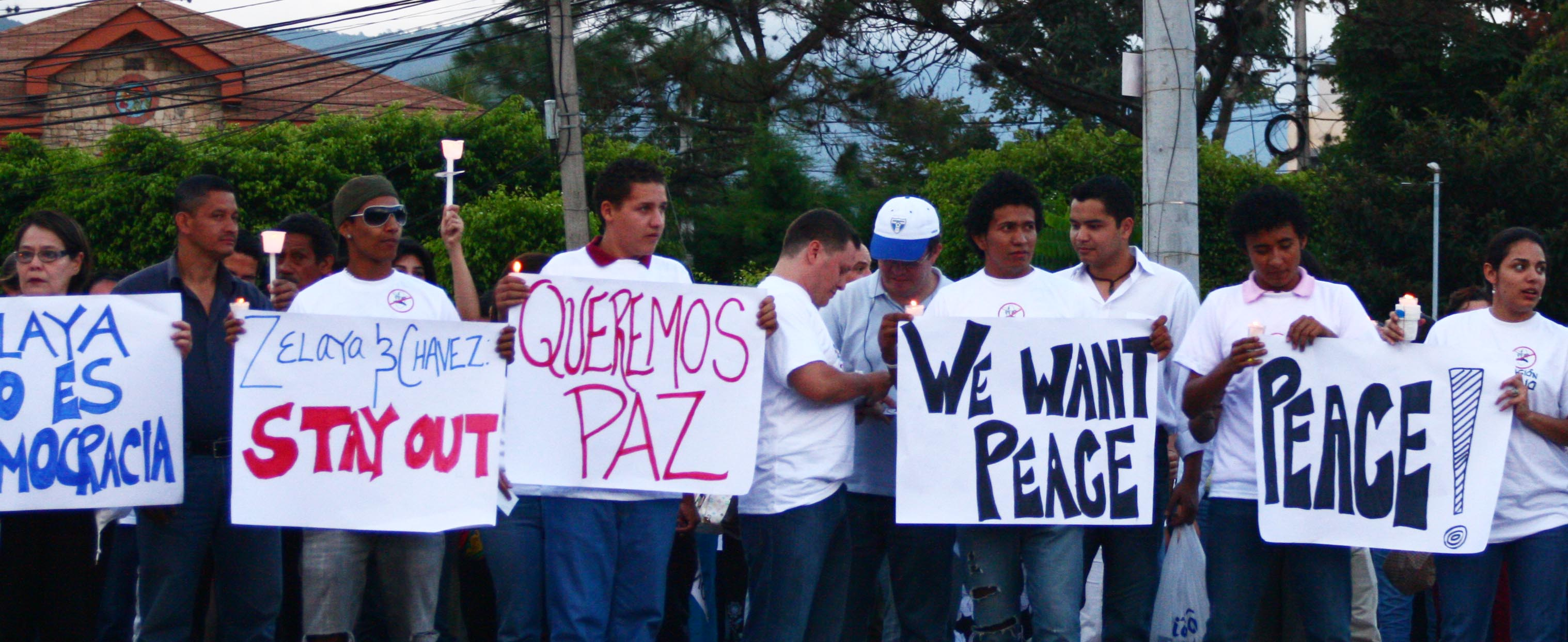
Demonstrators in Tegucigalpa on July 1, 2009

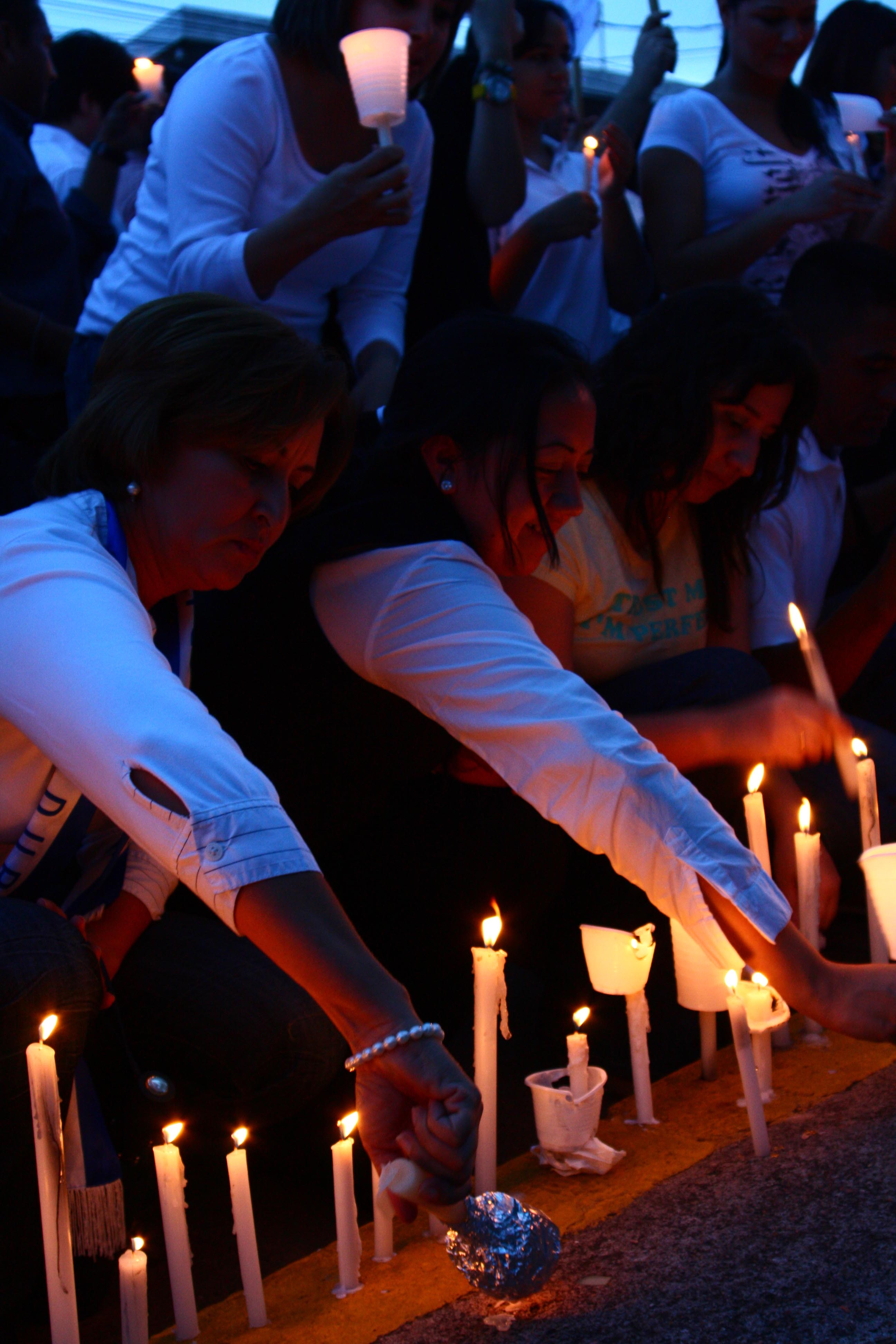
Demonstrators lighting candles in support of peace.

Unión Cívica Democrática (UCD, English: Civic Democratic Union) is a network of forty Honduran activist organizations, which took an active part during the 2009 Honduran constitutional crisis, promoting several demonstrations against the former ousted president Manuel Zelaya.

== Mission ==
Its supporters claim that, the organization defends democracy and the constitution of Honduras, while its opponents claim that it rather defends the interests of the local elite.
The organization's official mission is:

- To contribute to strengthening civil society.
- Promote institutional mechanisms for dialogue between different sectors of civil society and political parties and the state.
- Promote actions to strengthen public awareness and mobilize civil society to support universally accepted principles of collective welfare.

== Events ==
- June 26, 2009 - Demonstration for democracy and the constitution. Other organizations included the Peace and Democracy Movement.
- June 30, 2009 - Demonstrations. In an emotional speech, Armeda Lopez said "Chávez ate Venezuela first, then Bolivia, but in Honduras that didn't happen". Signboards included "Enough to illegality", "I love my Constitution".
- July 3, 2009–70,000 people demonstrated for the constitution and against Zelaya.
- July 7, 2009 - Demonstrations in six cities. The demonstrations were called El Plantón del Millón.
- July 22, 2009 - A hundred thousand demonstrators dressed in blue and white.
- August 20, 2009 - UCD files a complaint to the Inter-American Commission on Human Rights concerning Zelaya's and his followers' alleged violence and hate campaigns in Honduras.
- August 24, 2009 - Thousands of people dressed in white demonstrate outside OAS building.
- September 4, 2009 - UCD participated in marches expressing opposition to Hugo Chávez. The demonstrations were part of the worldwide No Más Chávez (No More Chávez) day.
- September 24, 2009 - Thousands demonstrating outside the United Nations building in Tegucigalpa.
- September 28, 2009 - A march supporting the oncoming general elections on November 29.
- October 1, 2009 - UCD supported decree PCM-M-016-2009 issued by interim government, suspending for 45 days five constitutional rights: personal liberty (Article 69), freedom of expression (Article 72), freedom of movement (Article 81), habeas corpus (Article 84) and freedom of association. Its spokesperson, Luz Ernestina Mejia, endorsed the closing during this period of critical media, namely Radio Globo and Canal 36, stating "We are against the repeated crimes of these journalists".

== See also ==
- 2009 Honduran constitutional crisis
- 2009 Honduran coup d'état
