= Union of the Democratic Centre =

Union of the Democratic Centre or Union of the Democratic Center may refer to:

- Union of the Democratic Centre (Argentina), a centrist party in Argentina
- Union of the Democratic Centre (Greece), a former liberal party in Greece
- Union of the Democratic Center (Mauritania), a former party in Mauritania
- Union of the Democratic Centre (Spain), a former centrist party in Spain
