= Radio Globo (Honduras) =

Radio Globo (HRXH-FM) is a radio station operating in Tegucigalpa, Honduras. The station broadcasts on 88.5 MHz in Tegucigalpa.

It is known for its opposition to the 2009 Honduran coup d'état as well as being the radio station for 24/7 news channel Globo TV. It is owned by Alejandro Villatoro.

== List of repeatersepeaters ==
Call sign	Frequency	City of license
HRXH	88.5 FM	Tegucigalpa
HRXH-1	90.7 FM	Comayagua
HRXH-2	104.5 FM	San Pedro Sula
HRXH-3	93.3 FM	Sonaguera
HRXH-4	95.5 FM	Santa Bárbara
HRXH-5	95.5 FM	Nueva Ocotepeque
HRXH-6	95.1 FM	La Ceiba
HRXH-8	95.1 FM	Tela
HRXH-9	97.9 FM	Choluteca
HRXH-10	97.9 FM	Nacaome
HRXH-11	98.3 FM	Juticalpa
HRXH-12	101.1 FM	Danlí
HRXH-13	106.7 FM	Catacamas
HRXH-14	107.5 FM	La Entrada

The station was headed by David Romero Ellner.

On September 28, 2009 it was taken off the air by the de facto Honduran government, which was able to do so due to a decree suspending some articles of the constitution of Honduras, On October 19, 2009 it went back on the air. It was awarded an Ondas Award for the best Iberoamericanan radio station for the team effort of fighting against the censorship of de facto government in 2009.
