= Krausirpi =

Village in Gracias a Dios, Honduras

Coordinates: 15°02′N 84°52′W

Krausirpi (also spelt Krausirpe) is a village in the department of Gracias a Dios, Honduras. The village is located on the bank of the Patuca River in Tawahka Asagni Biosphere Reserve. While part of the municipality of Wampusirpi, the town of Wampusirpi is located 30 kilometers away and is the nearest market town to Krausirpi. The village could only be reached by boat until 2020, when an illicit road was cut through the Tawahka Asagni Reserve. Krausirpi is the centre of the Tawahka people.

== Name ==
Krausirpi is a compound name. 'Krau' means 'island' in Tawahka language, while 'sirpi' means 'small' in the Miskito language.

== History ==
Krausirpi was founded in 1938 by the Tawahka chief Claudio Cardona. The original name of the village was Kaununhi. At the time, the Tawahka people had been uprooted from their traditional centre, Yapuwas, by disease and forced displacement by the Tiburcio Carias government and some of them settled down in the new village.

Around the time of the Honduran-Nicaraguan border conflict of 1958–1959, the government of Honduras founded a school in Krausirpi.

Another wave of migration from Yapuwas to Krausirpi took place in the early 1960s, as a number of Ladinos (escaping from law enforcement) had reached Yapuwas. In 1967 Moravian missionaries sent pastors to Krausirpi and built a church there.

In 1989, the National Agrarian Institute issued a guarantee of protected lands for the Tawahkas, extending some 7,500 hectares in the surroundings of Krausirpi. In 1992, a health sub-centre was built in the village. That same year, the first attempt to launch Krausirpi as an ecotourism destination was launched.

In the early 2000s, Krausirpi and the surrounding Moskitia region became epicenters for the illegal drug trade. Fueled by profits of cocaine smuggling and money laundering, deforestation increased dramatically to accommodate cattle ranching. The administration of president Xiomara Castro ordered the construction of a control post in the village to attempt to control the rampant deforestation in the nature reserve.

== Demographics ==
According to a 1995 estimate, the village was home to 58 households and 479 inhabitants. At the time, about half of the Tawahka people lived in the village. Another estimate stated that some 930 people lived in Krausirpi as of 1997, constituting the overwhelming majority of the Tawahka people in Honduras. According to a third estimate, some 100 Miskito people and 4 Ladinos lived in the village as of 1995. In a census for a study conducted in 2009, there were 115 houses, 218 families, and 1056 people living in the community.

Krausirpi is divided into two distinct areas, a Tawahka settlement and an area inhabited by Miskito people. The village hosts one Catholic church.

== Politics ==
The Tawahka Indigenous Federation of Honduras (FITH) is based in Krausirpi. Apart from FITH, there is also an Auxiliary Mayor (appointed by the municipal mayor), some NGO presence, parents' society, Health Committee and Teachers' Association.

Krausirpi, with its surroundings, is one of three electoral sectors in Wampusirpi municipality. In the 2009 presidential election Elvin Santos obtained 152 votes in the sector, Porfirio Lobo 124 votes, César Ham 9 votes, Felicito Ávila 3 votes and Bernard Martínez 3 votes.

== Economy ==
Around half of the inhabitants in the village work as artisans. The Tawahka grow rice, cassava, beans, and corn for their own consumption.

Cacao is grown in the area. Cacao farming began in the 1980s, when a non-governmental organization distributed hybrid seedlings. Community leaders have sought to promote ecotourism in the area, but with little success.
