= Financial irregularities during the Manuel Zelaya administration =

Alleged Financial irregularities during the Manuel Zelaya administration was an incident in Honduran politics in 2008 that related to squandering and embezzlement of presidential expenses.

In late 2008, then Honduran president Zelaya went as far as refusing to send Congress a budget, claiming that it was impossible to come up with numbers, even though the constitution required the president to provide budget. The alleged irregularities are currently being investigated by the post coup government.

== Early presidency ==
At least 20 alleged corruption scandals came to light during his first year. By February 2007, his administration had prosecuted four cases, and three had been dismissed while the others were still being investigated.

One of the early instances of alleged financial irregularities in the administration was a contract to resurface 94 miles of road from Tegucigalpa to Danli. The company was paid the full price of the contract, but it resurfaced only 50 kilometers.

Zelaya spent millions of dollars on consulting and professional costs without documentation. A joint investigation by auditors in Honduras has so far identified alleged squandering of presidential expenses amounting to 123,025,613.63 lempiras.

=== Corruption at Hondutel ===
Hondutel was the best-documented case of embezzlement. Manuel Zelaya's nephew Marcelo Chimirri is one of the suspects. The investigations were helped by evidence retrieved by the FBI. After the scandal was published in Honduran media, Chimirri sued the journalists. Renato Alvarez was sentenced to 2 years and 8 months in prison.

=== 2008 Allegations ===
Zelaya allegedly earmarked 5.4 million lempiras on mobilizing supporters of the country's accession to the Bolivarian Alternative for the Americas (ALBA), an organization founded by Hugo Chávez. The pro-ALBA "demonstration" took place on August 25, 2008. The beneficiaries included 38 individuals, union leaders, unions, and owners transport companies.

The constitution of Honduras requires that the President files the budget by September 15. Zelaya refused. He claimed that it was impossible to come up with numbers. Julio Raudales, Zelaya's former deputy minister, said the budgetary black hole cost the country some $400 million in funding. Cardinal Rodríguez criticized Zelaya for using public money to promote his plans instead of spending it on the poor. He said "We were good friends. But he changed drastically... It was Chávez."

On September 30, 2008 Zelaya issued emergency executive decree 46-A-2208, which authorized transfer of 30 million lempiras of public money to advertising of his fourth ballot box. Soon after he issued another emergency executive decree which is identical except that the money is transferred to his office. Auditors later found documentation of 29 checks and total 29,995,887.62 lempiras. The expenses weren't well documented. The supposed advertisers paid no sales tax.

=== 2009 Allegations ===
On May 30, 2009, auditors found that Zelaya had directly spent more than 2 billion lempiras without competitive bidding.

On June 24, Enrique Flores Lanza, Zelaya's chief of staff, withdrew millions of dollars from the Central Bank of Honduras. The money was taken "to help the Ministry of the Presidency" and transported by car to Lanza's office. The suspected theft was captured by surveillance cameras.
