= Public opinion on the 2009 Honduran coup d'état =

Public opinion on the 2009 Honduran coup d'état is divided in Honduras. There are three known opinion polls on the 2009 Honduran constitutional crisis. The polls show polarized Honduras. The first CID-Gallup showed support for President Manuel Zelaya's removal from office because of his actions but not the manner in which it was carried out. Subsequent opinion polls showed higher levels of opposition to the events of the coup, though the opinion of the government it inaugurated was more evenly mixed. According to the latest poll in October, only 48% of Hondurans regard Roberto Micheletti's performance as good or excellent, and 50% as bad or poor. Porfirio Lobo Sosa, an opposition member, led polls before the November elections and subsequently won the elections.

== Before the coup ==
In a 2008 survey, only one in four Hondurans approved Zelaya - the lowest approval rate of 18 regional leaders. On June 22 La Prensa counted that people had organized 18 Facebook groups against Manuel Zelaya. Tens of thousands Hondurans had joined the Internet campaigns against Zelaya.

== Opinion polls ==
Polling organization: Dates of polling: MOE and sample size:	CID-Gallup Aug 2008 – Jul 2009 +/– 3.3% (>1000 adults)	COIMER & OP 23–29 Aug. +/− 4% (1,470 surveys)	Greenberg Quinlan Rosner 9–13 Oct. 2009 (621 individuals)
Do you favor Zelaya's expatriation?	Yes 41% / No 46% / NR 13%	Yes 17.4% / No 52.7% / NR 29.9%	Yes 38% / No 60% / NR 3%
Did Zelaya's actions justify his removal from office?	Yes 41% / No 28% / NR 31%		
Favor constitutional convention to resolve crisis?			Yes 54% / No 43% / NR 11%
Favorable opinion of Manuel Zelaya?	Favorable 46% / Unfavorable 44%	Favorable 44.7% / Unfavorable 25.7% / "Regular" 22.1% / NR 7.5%	Warm 37% / Cool 39% (Personal opinion); Approve 67% / Disapprove 31% (Government actions)
Favorable opinion of Roberto Micheletti?	Favorable 30% / Unfavorable 49%	Favorable 16.2% / Unfavorable 56.5% / "Regular" 17.1% / NR 10.2%	Warm 28% / Cool 57% (personal opinion); Approve 48% / Disapprove 50% (Government actions)
Favorable opinion of Hugo Chávez?			Warm 10% / Cool 83% (personal opinion)
Zelaya should be restored?		Yes 51.6% / No 33% / NR 15.4%	Yes 46% / No 52% / NR 2% (Full powers); Yes 49% / No 50% / NR 1% (Limited powers)
Elections should go forward even if crisis unresolved?		Yes 66.4% / No 23.8% / NR 2.9%	Legitimate 54% / Illegitimate 42% / NR 4%

=== CID-Gallup poll comment ===
CID-Gallup conducted a poll in 16 of the nation's 18 departments between 30 June and 4 July, but the results were reported initially to the press on 9 July and 10 July, leading to confusion. Honduran newspapers, such as El Heraldo, and some news sources outside Honduras, such as the Washington Post, reported that when asked whether they believed the removal of President Zelaya was justified, 41% agreed, 28% disagreed, and 31% said don't know/won't answer. However, the New York Times, the Associated Press, and others reported, possibly based upon an interview of the President of CID-Gallup, that 46% disagreed with Zelaya's ouster, 41% approved of it, with 13% declining to answer.

A blogger obtained the original data from CID-Gallup and explained the inconsistency. CID-Gallup asked two different questions:

Q: Do you consider the actions taken by Mel Zelaya with respect to the fourth ballot box to have justified his dismissal from the post of President of the Republic?
¿Considera usted que las acciones que tomó Mel Zelaya con respecto a la cuarta urna justificaban su destitución del puesto de Presidente de la República?
Yes 41%, No 28%, Don't know/No answer: 31%.

Q: Do you agree with the action taken last Sunday that removed President Zelaya from the country?
¿Cuánto está usted de acuerdo con la acción que se tomó el pasado domingo que removió el Presidente Zelaya del país?
Support 41%, Oppose 46%, Don't know/No Answer 13%.

Some press sources reported the results from the first question, and some the results from the second question.

== See also ==
Honduran general election, 2009
