= Juan Ramón Martínez =

Juan Ramón Martínez may refer to:

- Juan Ramón Martínez (footballer) (1948–2024), football player from El Salvador
- Juan Ramon Martinez (politician) (born 1941), Honduran writer and politician

== See also ==
- Juan Martínez (disambiguation)
