= Bernard Martínez Valerio =

Honduran politician

Bernard Martínez Valerio (born 19 January 1962) is trade union and Garifuna leader who was a candidate for the Innovation and Unity Party (PINU) in the Honduran 2009 presidential election. He was formerly a member of the Honduran Patriotic Front (FPH).

== Candidature in 2009 presidential election ==
Bernard Martínez stood as a candidate for PINU in the 2009 presidential election in Honduras, which was held on 29 November 2009.

Bernard Martínez sees the Innovation and Unity Party (PINU) as being labelled "social-democratic" in relation to the concepts of liberty, equality and solidarity, that he attributes to social democracy.

In relation to the 2009 Honduran constitutional crisis, Martínez stated that Manuel Zelaya had carried out his project for constitutional reform with "disorder and indiscipline", that led to his failure and removal. He stated that reforms to the Constitution were necessary within the mechanisms established by that same constitution. He supported the interim government of Roberto Micheletti.

Martínez said that the "bipartisan" dominance of Honduras by the Liberal Party and the National Party had done more ill than good and that by their poor policies and support for corruption, they are responsible for poverty.

PINU stated that Martínez was the "first black presidential candidate" in Honduras. Martínez said that the term "Honduran Barack Obama" used by some media to describe him was an innovation by journalists and not his own point of view.
