= Jesse Freeston =

Canadian video journalist and filmmaker

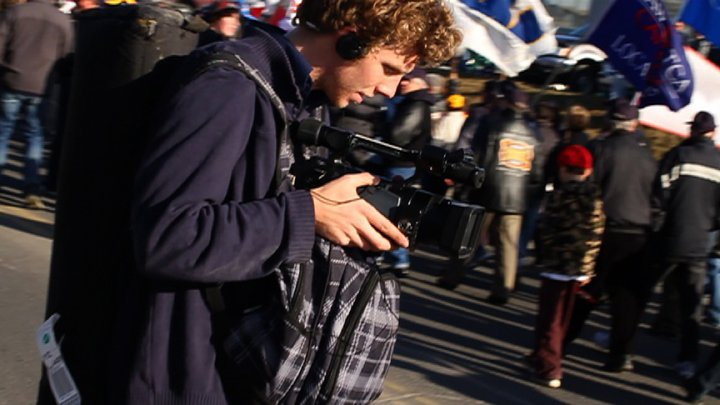
- Jesse Freeston filming in Sudbury, Ontario. Photo by Bert Riviere
- Born: February 18, 1985 (age 41)
- Occupation: Video-Journalist/Filmmaker

Jesse Freeston (born February 18, 1985) is a Canadian video journalist and filmmaker on social movements in North and Central America, the military-industrial complex, the 2008 financial crisis, and undocumented migration. He is mostly known for exposing fraud in the Honduran election of 2009, and for his coverage of the 2010 G-20 summit in Toronto, where Freeston was attacked by an officer with the Toronto Police Service before having his microphone ripped from his hand by another officer. His video-journalism work with The Real News Network, which is all licensed copyleft, has been republished by outlets including The Huffington Post, Common Dreams and Le monde diplomatique. In 2012 he made three 30-minute Spanish-language documentaries for the Venezuelan government propaganda network Telesur.

== 2009 Honduran coup d'état ==
Since the 2009 Honduran coup d'état, Freeston has produced roughly 30 mini-documentaries on the coup and the rise of the National People's Resistance Front. He has covered the post-coup struggles of various groups such as the students and teachers, the feminists, the musicians and ousted president Zelaya's return to Honduras. However, his prime focus has been on the land conflict in the Bajo Aguán part of Honduras' Aguán River Valley following the December 2009 occupation of more than 10,000 hectares of palm oil plantations by the Aguan Unified Campesino Movement. According to Devlin Kuyek of GRAIN, Freeston's video documenting the burning to the ground of the village of Rigores by Honduran police "vividly illustrates the courageous struggle for land and food sovereignty that peasants in Honduras are waging against the ruthless combined force of agribusiness and national and foreign governments." Freeston is currently in post-production on a feature-length documentary on the land conflict in the Aguan Valley.

== Honduran election fraud ==
In November 2009, the Honduran coup regime held elections that, in Freeston's words, "laundered a military coup". In a December 6, 2009 report from the Honduran capital of Tegucigalpa, Freeston provided evidence that the election was more theatre than democratic practice. In particular, he exposed that the Honduran Supreme Electoral Tribunal's own internal figures on voter turnout were not 65% as election winner Pepe Lobo and Western media reported, but actually 49%. His conclusion was that no one could know for sure how many Hondurans voted, given that the election was run by the same military that overthrew the elected president five months earlier, and that all international election monitoring groups (including the UN, Organization of American States, Carter Center, and EU) refused to observe the election. On December 22, 2009, Freeston was featured on Honduras' Radio Globo alongside ousted Honduran President Manuel Zelaya and American University Anthropologist Adrienne Pine, where he spoke about electoral fraud.

== Canadian mining in El Salvador ==
In 2008, Freeston reported from El Salvador on Canadian mining company Pacific Rim's attempt to open an industrial gold mine in the Central American country. He documented how the company hired 'promoters' in communities opposed to mining, a move that led to violence in a phenomenon the Salvadoran social movement began to call "social contamination". His video reports for The Real News document the popular resistance to mining and the $100 million lawsuit Pacific Rim launched against the government of El Salvador itself for alleged losses when, after months of exploration, it was denied a mining permit. In a November 15, 2009 story for The Real News, Freeston interviewed Tom Shrake, the CEO and President of Pacific Rim about the lawsuit. Shrake claimed Pacific Rim followed El Salvador's mining, investment, and environmental laws and was therefore denied a mining permit illegally. Freeston's investigation from San Isidro revealed contamination of the country's little-accessible water during the exploration stage, the inflammation of conflict by company promoters, the perception that the 2% tax Pacific Rim would pay on its revenues, and other social and environmental concerns were behind the resistance to the proposed mining project. He also reported on cases of murder and torture of anti-mining activists, such as that of Gustavo Marcelo Rivera. The Rivera family maintains that Rivera was killed for his opposition to the mining project and the local leadership that supports it.

== FMLN victory in 2009 Salvadoran elections ==
In 2009, Freeston covered the El Salvadoran elections from the country's capital, San Salvador. He documented the historic ascension to power of former guerrilla group FMLN and their presidential candidate, former journalist Mauricio Funes. According to Freeston, it marked the first time in 500 years that a leader not supported by the tiny Salvadoran elite would take a position of power in the country.

== G-20 coverage ==
During the 2010 G-20 Summit in Toronto, Freeston published a series of video stories for The Real News. Most of his stories focused on police brutality and repression against activists before, during, and after the Summit. Freeston was himself the target of police violence when he was attacked during one of the demonstrations. He spoke about the event in a CTV interview after the incident. "I was taken back by my collar, I was thrown against bikes and then one officer punched me twice in the mouth." In another CTV interview he added, "I then had my mic stolen from me by one of the officers as you'll see in the tape, and it was only after a few other journalists gathered around and put pressure on them that they returned my mic within a few minutes." When asked whether he believes he was targeted, he answered, "there's a pattern here, we've seen numbers of journalists that have gone through similar things. I wasn't detained, but there are numerous journalists who were detained and we see a real pattern here throughout the weekend of journalists being denied access." Freeston filed an official complaint with the Office of the Independent Police Review Director, but as of June 2011, he had received no response.

In a piece published by the Canadian Journalism Project, Freeston asked all concerned journalists to openly call for a public inquiry into police actions during the G20. He called into question the meaning of having Freedom of the Press listed as a fundamental freedom in the Canadian Charter of Rights and Freedoms, saying that "no crisis, real or perceived, gives authorities the right to revoke it. On the contrary, it is precisely for such times that these freedoms exist. In other words, it is not to cover Blue Jays games that we have freedom of the press, but specifically to document things like extraordinary measures taken by authorities." Ontario Premier Dalton McGuinty said no public inquiry was necessary.

In the months following the summit, Freeston filed additional reports and opinion pieces about the G-20 aftermath including the story of Alex Hundert. Hundert is a Kitchener-based activist who was arrested in a house raid before the G-20 began and charged, alongside 17 other activists, with conspiracy. After being released on bail, Hundert was re-arrested and jailed for participating as an invited speaker on a university panel at Ryerson University in Toronto. The government argued that his participation on a panel broke his bail condition barring him from participating in public protests. The courts agreed and adjusted Hundert's bail conditions to ban all political speech, including to the media. In an apparent challenge to the ban, Freeston published a 10-minute video that included a lengthy interview with Hundert, which according to Freeston was filmed before the ban was put into place.

== Officer Bubbles ==
Also following the G-20, Freeston released a mini-documentary based around the experience of lawyer Riali Johanesson during the mass arrest of anti-G20 activists in the working-class Toronto neighborhood of Parkdale. Johanesson was detained without charges when she arrived to provide legal advice to a client who had been detained without charges. Freeston and colleague Nazrul Islam captured footage of Toronto Police 52 Division Constable Adam Josephs threatening a G-20 protester for blowing bubbles. A short YouTube video of the confrontation was released as a supplement to the longer Parkdale video. The shorter video received more than 1,000,000 views and was commented on by international news outlets as far away as Fox News in the United States and ABC National News in Australia. In an appearance on Dan Speerin's show Truth Mashup lamented the "YouTube physics" that saw the "Officer Bubbles" video skyrocket to stardom while the longer Parkdale video was "weighed down by all the context".

Josephs quickly became infamous in Toronto under the nickname "Officer Bubbles". According to Jesse McLean of the Toronto Star, "The original video of Const. Josephs became a symbol for what many viewed as heavy-handed policing during the G20 summit that brought world leaders to Toronto in June."

Josephs, with the support of the Toronto Police Union, filed a defamation lawsuit against Google-owned YouTube, a user who posted a "collection of eight cartoons… that show a police officer resembling Josephs engaging in abusive acts of power" and 24 additional YouTube users that commented on the cartoons. The animations depict "Officer Bubbles" arresting Santa Claus and Barack Obama, punching a news photographer, and overreacting in various ways. Josephs' lawsuit also targets 24 YouTube users who commented on the animation. However the lawsuit did not target the original news video.

The cartoons were removed by YouTube but copies were immediately uploaded by dozens of other YouTube users. Legal commentators across the spectrum said the lawsuit had zero chance of success and views of the original video tripled as a result of the lawsuit.

== Telesur ==
In 2012, Freeston made three 30-minute documentaries for the Venezuelan government television propaganda network, Telesur. Informar y Resistir en Honduras details the repression of critical journalists in post-coup Honduras, and includes interviews with numerous survivors. ¿Un sueño aplazado? is a look at activism in the United States following the Occupy Wall Street movement. Also in the U.S., Todo está bien argues that the two major political parties deny the true nature of the 2008 financial crisis, the film focuses on the regions of Detroit and Central Appalachia, alongside interviews with Noam Chomsky and Richard D. Wolff.

== Resistencia ==
Freeston is currently finishing a feature-length documentary, called Resistencia, on the farmer-led land occupation movement in Honduras' Lower Aguan Valley. According to Resistencia's Facebook page, the film is about "landless farmers [who] have taken over the most fertile land in Central America, the palm oil plantations of Miguel Facussé, the richest and most powerful man in Honduras. Just months after he helped organize a military coup."

Resistencia finished in second place at the Cuban Hat Pitch Contest at the 2012 Montreal International Documentary Festival. The film raised $21,210 through a crowdfunding campaign on the website Indiegogo. It is expected to be released sometime in 2013.

== Acknowledgements ==
- Professor of Viral Video at the 2010 School of Authentic Journalism in Cancún, Mexico.
- Invited speaker at the 2011 1st International Blogger Conference in Foz do Iguaçu, Brazil.
- Invited filmmaker for the Center for Independent Documentary's 2011 Kopkind Retreat.
