= Policy switch =

Politician doing the opposite of their campaign promises

In political science, a policy switch is when a candidate makes certain promises during a campaign and conducts an ideologically opposite agenda after election.

== History ==
Commenting on populism in Latin America, Paul Drake described what he called ‘bait-and-switch’ strategies, in which candidates engage in a redistributive discourse in order to attract the support of the poor, only later to apply neoliberal structural adjustment policies. It is possible that these ‘bait-and-switchers,’ as Drake called them, would actually prefer to implement their favored redistributive policies, but were forced by constraints deriving from market imperatives to implement orthodox policies. Kenneth Roberts proposed the bait-and-switch argument as one of the core characteristics of a new kind of Latin American populism (broad-based and supported by the lower classes, but implementing market-driven policies) of which presidents Alberto Fujimori of Peru (1990–2000) and Carlos Menem of Argentina (1989–99) would be exemplars.

However, the first scholar to propose and study the policy switch phenomenon on its own right was Susan Stokes, who studied 44 Latin American elections between 1982 and 1995. Stokes found that the policy switches in Latin America always occur from left to right. Her results show that a majority of presidents (27 out of 44, or 61.4 percent) have been elected with left-of-center political platforms and alliances, promising popular and non-neoliberal policies. Out of the 27 left-wing candidates elected from her sample, 16 (59.3 percent) switched to pro-market policies once in office and acted contrary to the platform on which they were elected, strengthening so-called structural reforms, making deals with international financial institutions, and deepening macroeconomic adjustment in order to maximize the country's economic performance and boost their reelection chances.

Stokes, however, failed to explain the unidirectional nature of the policy switch. Since there is no a priori reason why a candidate who has campaigned on the left would not embark upon his promised platform once elected, unless one would have to assume beforehand that right-of-center policies are technically superior. Departing from these shortcomings, Daniela Campello further developed Stokes' theory in order to better explain the underlying causal mechanisms of the policy switch. She expanded Stokes' sample from 44 to 89 cases of Latin American elections during the 1978–2006 period and found that the main predictor for a policy switch is economic, with the occurrence of a currency crisis alone being able to account for 77 percent of the switches. She found that a scarcity of international reserves leaves a country vulnerable to pressure from international investors, who demand the adoption of pro-market policies in return for the capital they invest. This would explain the unidirectionality of the phenomenon: right-of-center incumbents would already be pursuing the kind of policies demanded by the markets. Even when caught in a currency crisis in which such incumbents desperately need to attract capital, there would be no incentive to switch to the left as there normally aren't any international financing institutions willing to lend capital in exchange for a right to left policy switch. When leftist candidates come to power on a less market-driven platform, but find themselves faced by a currency crisis, however, they may feel pressured to abandon their campaign promises and switch to a pro-market approach in order to attract the capital needed to revive their flagging economies.

The presidency of Manuel Zelaya (2006-2009) in Honduras would later serve as critical case to confirm Campello's theory, as shown by Clayton M. Cunha Filho et al. Having been elected on a right-of-center platform, Zelaya would later switch to a left-of-center agenda, the first such case registered. But as Cunha Filho et al. showed, the same causal mechanisms described by Campello were in action, as he had assumed office during a severe currency crisis and found in the Venezuelan government of Hugo Chávez an international agent willing to lend him the badly needed capital in exchange for a switch to the left.
