= Juan Martínez =

Juan Martínez may refer to:

== Arts and entertainment ==
- Juan Martínez Montañés (1568–1649), sculptor of the Spanish Golden Age
- Juan Martínez de Jáuregui y Aguilar (1583–1641), poet and painter of the Spanish Golden Age
- Juan Martínez Abades (1862–1920), Spanish painter
- Juan Martínez Gutiérrez (1901–1976), Chilean architect
- Juan Luis Martínez (1942–1993), Chilean poet and writer

== Law and politics ==
- Juan Martínez de Medrano (died 1337-1338) Navarrese politician, regent of the Kingdom of Navarre, lieutenant of the Governor of Navarre, ricohombre, Baron and Lord of Sartaguda
- Juan Martínez de Ampiés (died 1533), Spanish army officer, first governor of Venezuela Province
- Juan Martínez de Rozas (1759–1813), Chilean lawyer and politician
- Juan Antonio Martínez (died 1854), interim President of Guatemala
- Juan Ramón Martínez (politician) (born 1941), Honduran newspaper columnist and politician
- Juan Manuel Martínez Nava (born 1954), Mexican politician
- Juan Antonio Martínez Varela (fl. 1999–2004), Salvadoran defense minister
- Juan Martinez (prosecutor), former Maricopa County homicide prosecutor

== Religion ==
- Juan Martínez (bishop of Lugo) (fl. 1277–1281), Galician clergyman
- Juan Martínez Silíceo (1486–1557), Spanish Roman Catholic bishop, cardinal and mathematician
- Juan Manual Martínez de Manzanillo (died 1592), Venezuelan Roman Catholic bishop
- Juan Martínez de Ripalda (1594–1668), Spanish Jesuit theologian

== Sports ==
=== Association football (soccer) ===
- Juan Ramón Martínez (footballer) (born 1948), Salvadoran footballer
- Juan Martínez Martínez (born 1955), Spanish footballer, and current coach of CD Castellón
- Juan Ignacio Martínez (born 1964), Spanish footballer
- Juan Martínez Munuera (born 1982), Spanish football referee
- Juan Martínez Marconi (born 1982), Chilean footballer
- Juan Manuel Martínez (born 1985), Argentine footballer
- Juan Manuel Martínez Jourdan (born 1981), Uruguayan football manager and former player
- Juan Carlos Martínez Camarena (born 1991), Mexican footballer
- Juan David Martínez (born 2001), Colombian footballer

=== Track and field ===
- Juan Máximo Martínez (1947–2021), Mexican long-distance runner
- Juan Martínez Brito (born 1958), Cuban discus thrower
- Juan Martínez Martin (born 1980), Spanish track and field athlete

=== Water sports ===
- Juan Martínez (swimmer) (born 1946), Spanish swimmer
- Juan Martínez (canoeist, born 1950), Mexican sprint canoer who competed in the 1960s and 1970s
- Juan Martínez (canoeist, born 1973), Mexican sprint canoer who competed in the 1990s

=== Other sports ===
- Juan Antonio Martínez (fencer) (born 1920), Cuban fencer
- Juan Martínez (equestrian) (1924–1994), Spanish Olympic equestrian
- Juan Antonio Martínez (basketball) (born 1944), Spanish basketball player
- Juan Tomás Martínez (born 1962), Spanish cyclist
- Juan Martínez Oliver (born 1964), Spanish road bicycle racer
- Juan Martínez de Irujo (born 1981), Spanish Basque pelota player

== Others ==
- Juan Martínez de Recalde (c.1540–1588), Spanish naval officer
- Juan Martinez, managing partner of Australian law firm HWL Ebsworth

== Other uses ==
- Portrait of Juan Martínez Montañés, Spanish oil painting by Diego Velázquez

== See also ==
- San Juan y Martínez, a municipality and town in the Pinar del Río Province of Cuba
