= Almendares =

Almendares may refer to:

- Almendares River, Cuba
- Almendares (baseball), a former club in Havana, Cuba
- Juan Ángel Almendares Bonilla (active from before 2001), Honduran physician, politician and human rights activist
