= Facussé =

Facussé or Facusse is a surname. Notable people with the surname include:

- Carlos Roberto Flores Facussé (born 1950), former President of Honduras
- Adolfo Facussé, Honduras businessman
- Miguel Facussé Barjum (1924–2015), Honduran businessman and landowner
