= Union of Beverage and Related Industry Workers =

Trade union in Honduras

STIBYS
- Union of Beverage and Related Industry Workers
- Sindicato de Trabajadores de la Industria de la Bebida y Similares
- Location: Honduras
- Key people: Carlos H. Reyes
- Affiliations: FUTH
- Website: https://stibys.blogspot.com/

Sindicato de Trabajadores de la Industria de la Bebida y Similares (Spanish for Union of Beverage and Related Industry Workers) is a trade union in Honduras founded in 1959. It is affiliated to FUTH, a trade union congress, and internationally to the IUF. STIBYS has worked together with other left-wing organizations in the CNRP (National Coordination of Civil Resistance) and was active in the resistance against the 2009 Honduras coup d'état.

As of 2009, the general secretary of STIBYS was Carlos Humberto Reyes, who stood in the November 2009 elections as an independent presidential candidate.
