= César Ham =

Honduran politician

César David Adolfo Ham Peña (born July 23, 1973) is a Honduran politician. He is a leader of the socialist Democratic Unification Party and a member of Parliament. He was the presidential candidate of his party for the 2009 elections in which he gained less than 2% of the votes.

He supported President Manuel Zelaya's initiative to form a convention for reforming the Constitution, and was one of the main organizers of the controversial non-binding poll that was scheduled for June 28, 2009, but never took place because Zelaya was ousted from office that day in a coup d'état. On September 16, 2009 he was the sole dissenter at a meeting of Honduran presidential candidates with the Costa Rican President Oscar Arias when he was the only candidate to support the San José Agreement's demand for the reinstatement of Manuel Zelaya.
