= Marcelo Chimirri =

Honduran businessman

Marcelo Chimirri, a nephew of the deposed president of Honduras Manuel Zelaya, is a former General Manager of the state-owned telecom company Hondutel. Chimirri was appointed as the head of the state-owned telecom company Hondutel after his uncle became president in 2006.

According to Reporters Without Borders, on May 8, 2006, Chimirri attacked reporter Octavio Carvajal, an action Carvajal attributed to embarrassing questions and criticism he had made about Chimirri. Chimirri reportedly grabbed Carvajal by the throat and said "I am not intimidating you because I am not someone who makes threats - I act and I execute... the president’s office is irritated by all the questions you have been asking."

Financial irregularities with Hondutel were later reported in the Honduran media. Marcelo Chimirri sued the journalists. In January 2008, the United States denied Chimirri a visa, citing evidence of corruption.

In April 2009, Latin Node Inc., an American company, pleaded guilty in Miami, Florida to making improper payments to Hondutel, "knowing that some, or all of those funds, would be passed on as bribes to officials of Hondutel". Three months later, Chimirri was arrested by the Dirección General de Investigación Criminal (DGNI) after being indicted on charges of bribery, fraud and abuse of authority, charges which he denies. Chimirri remains in prison. In addition to Chimirri, Oscar Danilo Santos (the former manager of Hondutel), Jorge Rosa, and James Lagos were all charged in connection with allegedly committing crimes of abuse of authority, fraud and bribery having received bribes of $1.09 million U.S. from a Latin Node in exchange for Hondutel providing that carrier lower rates than other firms. Auditor Julio Daniel Flores was charged for the lesser crime of violation of duties of officers.

== See also ==
- Hondutel
- Manuel Zelaya
- Financial irregularities during the Manuel Zelaya administration
