= Carlos Humberto Reyes =

Honduran politician

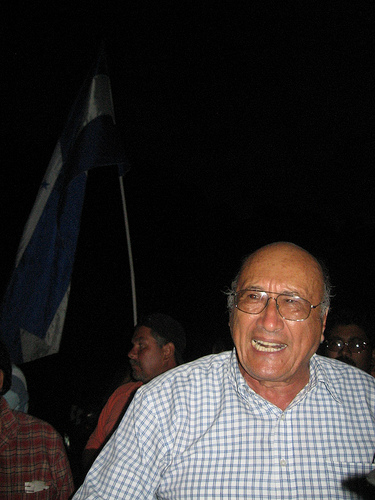
Carlos H. Reyes in July 2009, with Honduran flag in background

Carlos Humberto Reyes (often, Carlos H. Reyes) is leader of the trade union STIBYS in Honduras, a coordinator of the Frente Nacional de Resistencia contra el Golpe de Estado en Honduras and was an independent candidate for the 2009 Honduran presidential election before pulling out on November 9. He was injured by security forces during demonstrations on 30 July 2009.

== Candidacy in 2009 presidential election ==
Carlos H. Reyes was an independent candidate in the 2009 presidential election in Honduras, which were held on 29 November 2009.

An international human rights mission including, among others, Nora Cortiñas of Mothers of the Plaza de Mayo, reported that Carlos Humberto Reyes was injured on 30 July 2009 when "the army and the special forces of the National Police of Honduras attacked thousands of pacific demonstrators, with fire weapons, wood and rubber projectiles and as well as tear gas, thrown even from helicopters."

On 9 November 2009, following a national meeting of leaders of the National Resistance Front against the coup d'état, Reyes declared the withdrawal of his candidacy, on the grounds of not legitimising the coup d'état and fraudulent elections. The Honduran newspapers El Tiempo and La Tribuna showed Reyes' right hand in a plaster cast.
