= Twixters (TV series) =

TV series

Twixters is an international multiplatform comedy series inspired by the TIME Magazine. The series was created in 2007 by satirist/filmmaker Dan Speerin of the sketch comedy group Cynically Tested to satirize life as a Millennial and to mock the false perceptions of Generation Y. The series was co-produced by fellow Cynically Tested members Alan So and Aravinth Vince Kesavamoorthy. Twixters aired on Bite TV in Canada and Propeller TV in UK. The series also aired on Triangle Stratos in New Zealand. Twixters' success and the stance of its creator on Millennial Life was featured in the Toronto Star. Other media coverage for the series included Sun TV's Canoe Live, G4 Tech TV, and The Eye Weekly Magazine. The show's indie success is mainly due to its utilization of interactive social platforms as YouTube, Facebook, MySpace and Blogs. Part of their success is based on their rebuttal on YouTube to the piece on Millennials by 60 Minutes on CBS titled Twixters vs 60 Minutes Millennials, and Millennials Fight Back!. The latter video was covered by CBS Interactive’s BNET evoking greater discussion about the fairness of the coverage of the millennial generation by 60 Minutes.

== In popular culture ==
The TV series and its various multiplatform components continues to be a part of the social lexicon when discussing the millennial generation, as it has been referred to by educational, technological, political, business and marketing platforms as well as university curriculum. Some such examples include Inside Higher ED, Future Majority, Workforce Management’s HR Capitalists, and h+ Magazine. Jerry Pattengale, the founder of Purpose-Guided Education has cited content of the series in his text. Dr. Scott Bryant of Montana State University has also utilized various content of the show as part of his course. As a testament to their success in provoking discussion in the subject matter, Twixters’ creators and producers were invited to be guest panelists and speakers at the Millennials Conference Canada at Canadian Music Week 2008. Speerin and his team continue to be the voice of Generation Y as can be seen from the multi-page Ottawa Citizen print article in 2011.

== Follow Up: The What Is! ==
The producers of Twixters continued their focus on providing a voice to the millennial generation with the creation of The What Is!, a television miniseries that aired on ichannel. A half-hour Federal Election Special, titled The What Is!: Election 2008, focusing on youth voter issues pertaining to the federal election, made its debut on October 11. This special also doubled as the pilot episode for the series. The co-creator, writer and host of The What Is!, Dan Speerin, has teamed with his producing partners from Twixters, Alan So and Vince Kesavamoorthy, to produce the series under their production company Not Like Us Productions. Guests of the series include Navdeep Bains, Patrick Sullivan (then-President of Workopolis), and Jack Layton & Olivia Chow. An interactive component of this series is also available on Not Like Us Productions’ Cynically Tested Channel on MySpace, Facebook and YouTube and can be viewed at www.twixterstv.com. The show has been featured in various forms of media including The Toronto Sun, The Globe and Mail, Eye Weekly Magazine and Macleans on Campus. As a testament to the success of the series, The What Is! won a Television and Cable Productions Gold Remi award under the category Political Commentary at the 42nd Annual WorldFest-Houston International Film Festival. Others honored in this category included the Norddeutscher Rundfunk documentary Henry Kissinger – Secrets of a Superpower. The series won its second Gold Remi in the same category the following year at the 43rd Annual WorldFest-Houston International Film Festival.

== Dan Speerin's Truth Mashup ==
Following the success of their half-hour satire, Cynically Tested's Truth From Here on CBC Television, Not Like Us Productions debuted a new HD television series titled Dan Speerin's Truth Mashup on Rogers TV Toronto (channel 10 & 63, HD channel 510) on October 6, 2010. The series is created and produced by Dan Speerin, Alan So and Vince Kesavamoorthy. Speerin is also the host of the series. Each episode of Dan Speerin's Truth Mashup features sketches from Cynically Tested Channel, musical performances by some of Canada's up and coming musical talent, roundtable discussions with Toronto's top young comedians and journalists (filmed at The Cadillac Lounge), as well as one-on-one interviews with some of the most interesting and successful Canadians (filmed at The Toronto Underground Cinema). The show addresses topics such as the legitimacy of online media, the state of Canadian film and television industry, Canadian culture versus American culture, advertising and its permeation of the social fabric, as well as the 2010 Toronto mayoral elections. The series featured one-one-one interviews with Colin Mochrie, Geoff Lapaire and Jarett Cale (the creators of the popular online series turned Showcase television series Pure Pwnage), mayoral candidates of Toronto's Mayor Elections 2010 George Smitherman and Joe Pantalone, Jennifer Hollett of CBC's Connect with Mark Kelley, Journalist with the Real News Network Jesse Freeston, artists and activists Posterchild and Sean Martindale, as well as then-Mayor of Toronto David Miller. Musical guests of the show included Hooded Fang and Anna Cyzon.

Truth Mashup's coverage of the launch of Sun News Network and said network's right wing bias was covered by various media including The Grid Magazine (Toronto) and The Georgia Straight (Vancouver), TV-eh podcast and CIUT's Vibe Collective. The 2011 Federal Election was the first Canadian Federal Election since the social media boom. Truth Mashup's Dan Speerin is known as a social media savvy satirist. Speerin was consulted by many in the media including CBC's Connect with Mark Kelley and TVO's The Agenda with Steve Palkin. Speerin's humorous yet astute take on the role of social media in this federal elections appeared on CTV.ca. Truth Mashup's various response videos to the ethnic voter targeted political ad campaigns was featured in The Torontoist and was ranked as the top response by Vancouver's popular multicultural magazine Schema. Truth Mashup was also invited media guests at the NDP National Convention during the night of the elections.

Despite its limited reach on the television platform, Dan Speerin's Truth Mashup continues to garner a national audience through its various online social platforms. This is rendered visible by the media coverage the show has received by various media outlets across Canada, and the interview, panel and musical guests the show has been able to attract. Dan Speerin's Truth Mashup also received a Gold Remi for Political/Social Commentary at the World Fest in Houston in 2011, the third such award for Speerin and his team. Truth Mashup received a Television and Cable Production Remi Award for Political Commentary in 2011. This is the third consecutive award in this category for a talk series produced by Not Like Us Productions and helmed by Dan Speerin in the past three years.
