= 2005 Honduran general election =

- 27 November 2005
- Turnout: 55.08% (▼11.19pp)
- Presidential election
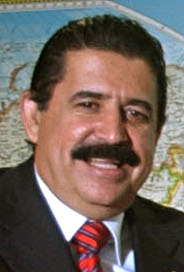

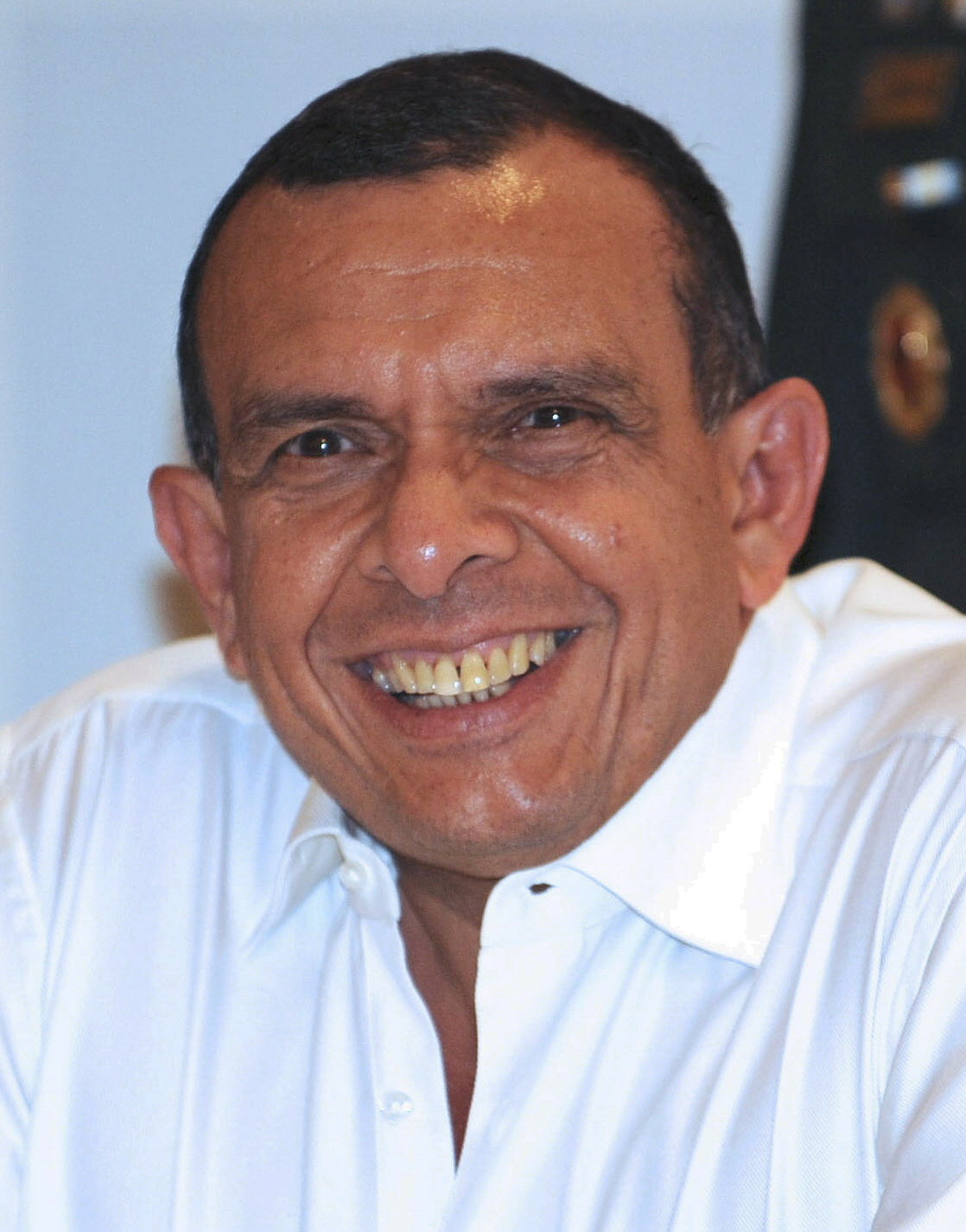
Nominee	Manuel Zelaya	Porfirio Lobo Sosa
Party	Liberal	National
Running mate	Elvin Santos	Mario Canahuati
Popular vote	999,006	925,243
Percentage	49.90%	46.22%
- Zelaya: 40–50% 50–60% 60–70% 70–80% 80–90% Tie: 40–50% Lobo: 40–50% 50–60% 60–70%
President before election
Ricardo Maduro
National
Elected President
Manuel Zelaya
Liberal
- Parliamentary election
- All 128 seats in the National Congress; 65 seats needed for a majority
Party	Vote %	Seats	+/–
Liberal	44.84	62	+7
National	40.42	55	−6
UD	5.67	5	0
PINU	4.66	2	−2
CD	4.40	4	+1
This lists parties that won seats. See the complete results below.
President of the Congress before	President of the Congress after
Porfirio Lobo Sosa; National	Roberto Micheletti; Liberal

General elections were held in Honduras to elect the President of Honduras, vice-president, and deputies to the National Congress of Honduras on 27 November 2005. The incumbent President of Honduras, Ricardo Maduro, was term limited. For this election, the constitution was amended to create a single vice-president (Hondurans previously elected three 'presidential designates' on a ticket along with the presidential candidate). For the 2005 election the system of proportional representation was also changed from a closed list to an open list — the parties also used open-list primaries to select candidate slates. The list system reduced the re-election rate of incumbents, with just 31% of deputies in the new Congress having seats in the 2002–2006 Congress.

== Primaries ==
Primary elections (internal party elections) were held for the first time in Honduras in this election, in February 2005. Only the Liberal Party and National Party participated in these elections, since the smaller parties lack significant factions. They were supervised by the official electoral body, and the 72-hour ban on the sale of alcohol which accompanies all official elections was also imposed over that weekend. 45% of the electorate voted in the primaries: 24% for the Liberals and 21% for the National Party. According to the Country Report quoted in the U.C. San Diego Library Latin American election results, "The low participation rate in the primaries . . . is a reflection of the lack of public faith in Honduras's political institutions and leaders." The electoral law requirement that women comprise at least 30% of candidates was not fulfilled by any faction in the primaries.

== Campaign ==
There were five presidential candidates; Carlos Sosa Coello (Innovation and Unity Party), Porfirio Pepe Lobo (National Party), Manuel Zelaya (Liberal Party), Juan Almendares (Democratic Unification Party) and Juan Ramón Martínez (Christian Democrats).

Porfirio Pepe Lobo led by a wide margin for much of the campaign. "However, as the contest got dirtier, Zelaya — who was on the receiving end of more of the negative campaigning (portraying him as corrupt and incapable of running the country) — benefited from popular support for the underdog."

Analyses after the election concluded that many National Party supporters stayed at home, confident of Lobo's victory, while the Liberal Party got its supporters to the polls.

== Results ==
=== President ===
According to an exit poll published by a local TV channel, Zelaya was ahead by 50.6 percent, against Lobo's 44.3%. However, Lobo, the National Party candidate did not accept the result of the election, arguing that the figures his own party had actually put him ahead in the race. The National Party had asked for a vote recount, accusing the Supreme Electoral Tribunal, the country's top electoral authority, of having committed gross errors in the process and 48 hours later had not allegedly still not produced any official results. Finally, after 10 days of waiting the National Party conceded the elections to Manuel Zelaya, the Liberal Party candidate and now, the president elect.

Candidate	Party	Votes	%
Manuel Zelaya	Liberal Party	999,006	49.90
Porfirio Lobo Sosa	National Party	925,243	46.22
Juan Ángel Almendares Bonilla	Democratic Unification Party	29,754	1.49
Juan Ramón Martínez	Christian Democratic Party	27,812	1.39
Carlos Sosa Coello	Innovation and Unity Party	20,093	1.00
Total		2,001,908	100.00
Valid votes		2,001,908	91.39
Invalid/blank votes		188,490	8.61
Total votes		2,190,398	100.00
Registered voters/turnout		3,976,550	55.08
Source: TSE

==== By department ====
Department	Zelaya		Lobo Sosa		Almendares		Martínez		Sosa Coello	
Department	Votes	%	Votes	%	Votes	%	Votes	%	Votes	%
Atlántida	39,136	49.2%	37,661	47.3%	919	1.2%	740	0.9%	1,116	1.4%
Bay Islands	5,738	50.0%	5,568	48.6%	40	0.4%	71	0.6%	51	0.4%
Choluteca	57,273	46.5%	62,941	51.1%	732	0.6%	1,426	1.2%	819	0.7%
Colón	31,564	56.0%	22,764	40.4%	1,474	2.6%	371	0.7%	232	0.4%
Comayagua	52,288	52.1%	45,238	45.0%	1,137	1.1%	974	1.0%	795	0.8%
Copán	45,007	50.9%	41,166	46.6%	756	0.9%	773	0.9%	692	0.8%
Cortés	139,848	51.4%	116,169	42.7%	5,585	2.1%	5,599	2.1%	4,946	1.8%
El Paraíso	65,110	56.0%	48,975	42.1%	928	0.8%	805	0.7%	539	0.5%
Francisco Morazán	165,553	44.7%	182,637	49.3%	8,442	2.3%	8,554	2.3%	5,628	1.5%
Gracias a Dios	6,868	59.3%	4,196	36.2%	173	1.5%	260	2.3%	83	0.7%
Intibucá	25,724	45.3%	28,637	50.4%	943	1.7%	1,032	1.8%	488	0.9%
La Paz	23,575	52.1%	19,939	44.1%	812	1.8%	533	1.2%	357	0.8%
Lempira	30,458	46.7%	33,416	51.2%	384	0.6%	594	0.9%	371	0.6%
Ocotepeque	21,411	53.8%	17,388	43.7%	250	0.6%	416	1.1%	335	0.8%
Olancho	63,498	51.5%	57,636	46.7%	833	0.7%	839	0.7%	527	0.4%
Santa Bárbara	60,279	51.7%	53,263	45.7%	1,586	1.4%	873	0.8%	519	0.5%
Valle	25,990	50.5%	24,302	47.2%	354	0.7%	691	1.3%	172	0.3%
Yoro	55,554	53.2%	44,392	42.5%	2,377	2.3%	1,159	1.1%	1,003	1.0%
Source: Adam Carr

=== National Congress ===
Zelaya's Liberal Party also emerged victorious in the parliamentary election, winning 62 of the 128 seats.

Party	Votes	%	Seats	+/–
Liberal Party	7,746,806	44.84	62	+7
National Party	6,983,056	40.42	55	–6
Democratic Unification Party	979,480	5.67	5	0
Innovation and Unity Party	805,413	4.66	2	–2
Christian Democratic Party	760,161	4.40	4	+1
Total	17,274,916	100.00	128	0
Valid votes	2,001,908	91.39		
Invalid/blank votes	188,490	8.61		
Total votes	2,190,398	100.00		
Registered voters/turnout	3,977,073	55.08		
Source: PDBA, IPU, Election Passport
