= Juan Ángel Almendares Bonilla =

Honduran physician

Juan Ángel Almendares Bonilla is a Honduran physician, politician and human rights activist. A former Dean of Medicine of the Hospital Esquela at the Honduran National Autonomous University, Almendares taught for many years and operates a free clinic in the capital city of Tegucigalpa, Honduras. He ran as part of the Democratic Unification Party in the 2005 Honduran general election, finishing in third place with 1.5% of the vote. Almendares currently serves as the co-chair of the Honduran Committee for Peace Action (COHAPAZ). Dr. Almendares received his training at Perelman School of Medicine at the University of Pennsylvania, and was the recipient of the 2001 Barbara Chester Award for his work with victims of torture. Almendares was an outspoken critic of the 2009 Honduras coup d'état that overthrew the elected President Manuel Zelaya.

== See also ==
- COHAPAZ
