= Elvin Santos =

Honduran politician

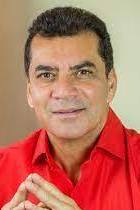

Vice President of Honduras
- In office 27 January 2006 – 18 November 2008
- President: Manuel Zelaya
- Preceded by: Vicente Williams Agasse (as First Vice President); Armida Villela de López Contreras (as Second Vice President); José Alberto Díaz Lobo (as Third Vice President)
- Succeeded by: Arístides Mejía (as Vice President Commissioner)

Personal details
- Born: Elvin Ernesto Santos Ordóñez; 18 January 1963 (age 63) Tegucigalpa, Honduras
- Party: Liberal Party
- Spouses: Becky Manzanares (m. 1990; div. 2018) Marcela Montaño (m. 2018)
- Education: Lamar University

Elvin Ernesto Santos Ordóñez (born 18 January 1963 in Tegucigalpa) is a Honduran politician who served as the vice president of Honduras from January 2006 to November 2008, when he resigned to stand as a Liberal Party candidate for the presidency in the 2009 elections. For the 2005 election the constitution was amended to create a single vice president. (Hondurans previously elected three 'presidential designates' on a ticket along with the presidential candidate.) Although Santos served as vice president under the presidency of Manuel Zelaya, he distanced himself from Zelaya since there were conflicts between the two politicians. He was also against the fourth ballot box referendum that Zelaya promoted.

== Biography ==
Elvin Santos is the son of Elvin Santos Lozano, an engineer, and Sonia Ordóñez de Santos. Santos has a Bachelor of Science Degree in Civil Engineering from Lamar University in Beaumont, Texas. He also served as Honduran consul in Austin, Texas.

He is married to Becky Manzanares de Santos and has four children Elvin, Rebeca, Adrian and Natalia. He has only recently entered the political arena. He is the CEO of the construction company owned by his family, Santos y Compañia, which employs approximately 1,200 people. The company has various contracts with the Secretaría de Obras Públicas Transporte y Vivienda (SOPTRAVI), for the maintenance of public infrastructure and the construction of the ring-road in Tegucigalpa. This situation has led to accusations of conflict of interest.

Santos has been a member of the Honduran Council of Private Enterprise (COHEP).

== 2009 Honduran general election ==
Santos received the Liberal Party's nomination in December after he resigned as vice president to run for the presidency in the November 2009 elections. Mauricio Villeda Bermudez, who defeated Roberto Micheletti in the primary, resigned to allow Santos become the candidate. On 29 November 2009, Santos lost the election against his opponent Porfirio Lobo Sosa, as predicted by the polls, by a considerable margin of 17.75%.

Political offices
Preceded by Vicente Williams Agasse (1st Vice President); Armida Villela de López Contreras (2nd Vice President); José Alberto Díaz Lobo (3rd Vice President)	Vice President of Honduras; 2006–2008	Succeeded by Arístides Mejía (Vice President Commissioner)
