= Clayton Mendonça Cunha Filho =

Political science professor

Clayton M. Cunha Filho is a professor of Political Science at the Federal University of Ceará in Fortaleza, Brazil.
