= Adolfo Facussé =

Honduran businessman

Adolfo Facussé is a Honduran businessman known for his support for the de facto government of Roberto Micheletti during the 2009 Honduran constitutional crisis. On September 12, he was refused entry to the United States and deported for this support. Until April 2013, he was president of El Consejo Hondureño de la Empresa Privada (COHEP), a body representing private businesses in Honduras, though he remained president of a similar national organization, the Asociación Nacional de Industriales (Andi).
