= Roberto Micheletti =

36th president acting of Honduras (2009-2010)

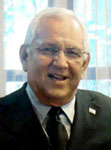
- Micheletti in 2009

36th President of Honduras
- In office 28 June 2009 – 27 January 2010
- Vice President: Vacant
- Preceded by: Manuel Zelaya
- Succeeded by: Porfirio Lobo Sosa

7th President of the National Congress
- In office 25 January 2006 – 28 June 2009
- Preceded by: Porfirio Lobo Sosa
- Succeeded by: José Alfredo Saavedra (acting)

Deputy of the Yoro Department
- In office 25 January 1982 – 26 January 2006

Personal details
- Born: Roberto Micheletti Baín; 13 August 1943 (age 83) El Progreso, Yoro, Honduras
- Party: Liberal Party
- Spouse: Siomara Girón
- Children: 3
- Profession: Businessperson

Roberto Micheletti Baín (born 13 August 1943) is a Honduran politician who served as the interim and 36th president of Honduras from 28 June 2009, to 27 January 2010, as a result of the 2009 Honduran coup d'état.

The Honduran military ousted the President, and the National Congress read a letter of resignation, which was refuted two minutes later by Manuel Zelaya in conversation with CNN en Español; days later, the coup-plotters claimed that the Supreme Court had ordered to forcefully detain President Manuel Zelaya because "he was violating the Honduran constitution"; Zelaya was exiled rather than arrested. Micheletti, constitutionally next in line for the presidency, was sworn in as president by the National Congress a few hours after Zelaya was sent into exile by the Honduran military. He was not acknowledged as de jure president by any government or international organization. The 2009 general election took place as planned in November and elected Porfirio Lobo Sosa to succeed Micheletti.

Before serving as president, Micheletti was the president of Honduras' National Congress. A deputy in Congress since 1982, Micheletti is currently a member of the Liberal Party of Honduras.

== Family background ==
Born in El Progreso, Yoro Department, Micheletti was the eighth of nine siblings (6 boys, 3 girls). Micheletti's father was Umberto Micheletti, who immigrated from the Bergamo province of Lombardy, Italy. His mother was Donatella Bain Moya, also born in El Progreso.

He is married to Siomara Girón and they have three children.

== Political career ==
In 1963, Micheletti was a member of the honor guard of President Ramón Villeda, who was toppled by the military; Micheletti was arrested and jailed on 3 October and jailed for 27 days. In 1973 he moved to the United States, living in Tampa, Florida, then in New Orleans, Louisiana, for two years before returning to Honduras in 1976. While living in the US he finished high school and started his own business.

=== Deputy ===
Micheletti won a Congressional seat in 1982 which he has held till June 2009, except for a brief period when he ran Hondutel, Honduras' state-owned national telephone company.

In 1985 Micheletti was part of a group of deputies who signed a motion calling for the National Congress to reseat itself as a National Constituent Assembly. A Venezuelan government webpage claims that the proposal was aimed at enabling then-President Roberto Suazo to run for re-election in the 1985 Honduras presidential election. Ultimately the proposal was dropped when most congressmen refused to support the motion.

He has twice sought his party's nomination to run for president, both times failing to win the internal election for the nomination of his party, the latter occasion in 2008 to former Vice President Elvin Santos, who won the Liberal nomination for the November 2009 presidential election.

=== President of the National Congress ===
Micheletti presided over the National Congress of Honduras from 25 January 2006 until 28 June 2009. Although he was a member of the same party as Manuel Zelaya, there had been conflict between the two politicians before the constitutional crisis.

== Interim Presidency (2009–2010) ==
The Ministerio Publico's office charged Manuel Zelaya with violations of the constitution, laws and court orders. The Supreme Court issued an arrest warrant. On the morning of Sunday, June 28, 2009, the military arrested President Zelaya and deported him to Costa Rica.

After a resignation letter from President Manuel Zelaya was read to the National Congress of Honduras, which Zelaya later denied writing, Zelaya was dismissed as president, by a show of hands in the National Congress, on 28 June. Congress, under Articles 1, 2, 3, 4, 205, 220, subsections 20, 218, 242, 321, 322 and 323 of the Constitution of the Republic, unanimously agreed to:

- disapprove Zelaya's repeated violations of the constitution, laws and court orders,
- remove Zelaya from the post, and,
- name the current President of Congress Roberto Micheletti to complete the constitutional term ending January 27, 2010.

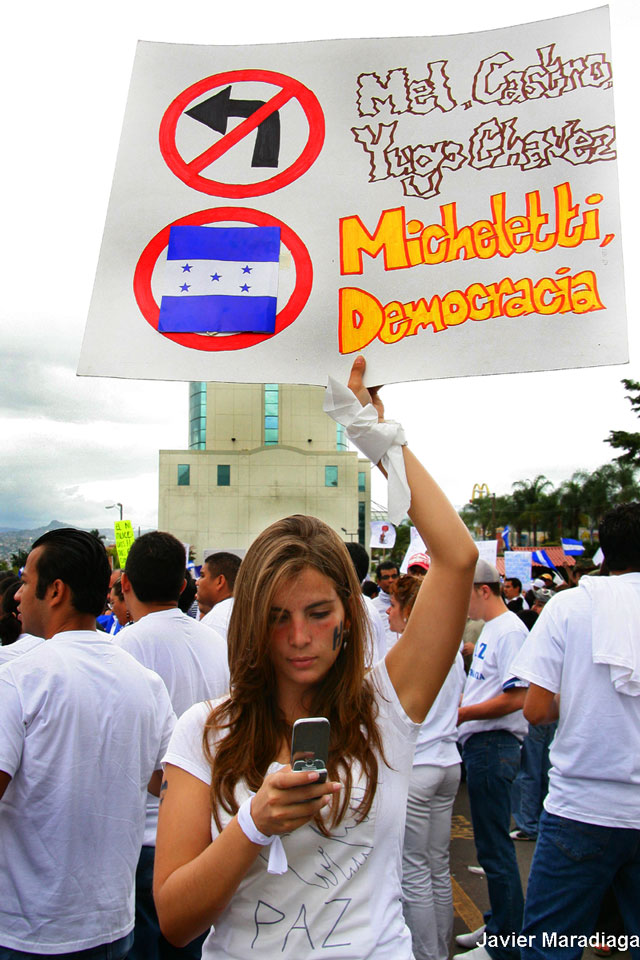
A demonstrator in support of Micheletti

The Honduran constitution mandated that the head of Congress, Roberto Micheletti, act as the provisional head of state since Vice President Elvin Ernesto Santos had resigned in December 2008 to run for president.

Micheletti's term in office saw demonstrations for and against him, although the demonstrations for him encountered none of the violent repression from the police.

Domestically his government was supported by organizations such as Unión Cívica Democrática and opposed by the "Resistance".

International support for the Micheletti government was scant. Official reactions from many international leaders condemned the ousting of President Zelaya, many of them calling for his reinstatement. The Organization of American States (OAS) said it would not recognize any government other than that of Manuel Zelaya.

The United States rejected the overthrow of Zelaya in statements by President Barack Obama, Secretary of State Hillary Clinton and Ambassador to Honduras Hugo Llorens. The European Union also condemned the ousting of Zelaya. Cuban president Raúl Castro asked for the return of democracy in Honduras. Venezuelan President Hugo Chávez stated that he had put his nation's armed forces on alert, and vowed to take military action if Venezuela's embassy or envoy to Honduras were harmed.

Micheletti's 25-year-old nephew Enzo Micheletti was abducted and found murdered in late October 2009 though no evidence linking this crime to the political events going on was discovered.

Deaths that have been allegedly linked to the violence in the aftermath of the coup include 19-year-old Isis Obed Murillo Mencías, shot in the head on 5 July when Zelaya's plane was trying to land at Toncontin Airport; 40-year-old campesino leader and Democratic Unification Party member Ramón García on 12 July, after he was forced by unknown people to get off a bus; 23-year-old Pedro Magdiel Muñoz Salvador, allegedly detained by police during anti-coup protests and taken to an El Paraíso police station on 24 July, allegedly found at 6:30 am the following morning with 42 stab wounds and 38-year-old high school teacher Roger Abraham Vallejo Soriano, shot in the head allegedly by security forces during protests on 31 July, dying on 1 August.

Costa Rican President Óscar Arias acted as a mediator in the talks between the Honduran government and Manuel Zelaya to try to find a political solution. He presented a seven-point agreement, which called for a unity government. Zelaya wanted to become president again and the Supreme Court warned that only Congress could grant amnesty to Zelaya. Zelaya's representatives accepted the Arias proposal "in principle" but Micheletti's representatives balked at the key point of Zelaya returning to power in Honduras.

In an open letter to the Wall Street Journal published on 27 July 2009, Roberto Micheletti listed the Honduran government's reasons and justification for ousting Zelaya. In it, Micheletti claimed Zelaya's removal from office was supported by the Supreme Court (15-0), an overwhelming majority of Congress, the Supreme Electoral Tribunal, the Administrative Law Tribunal, the independent Human Rights Ombudsman, the two major presidential candidates of the Liberal and National Parties and Honduras’ Catholic Cardinal. Micheletti also stated that it was not a "military coup" since the military was following orders given by a civilian Supreme Court and Zelaya was replaced with a civilian from the line of succession prescribed in the Constitution.

On 21 August 2009, the Inter-American Commission on Human Rights dispatched a six-member delegation which reported accusations it received. The delegation was told of alleged violent confrontations and arbitrary arrests. Someone even accused the police of rape. Some alleged that judges were threatened "at gunpoint". Based on the statements it received, the delegation concluded that there was "an atmosphere of intimidation that inhibits the free exercise of freedom of expression".

On March 11, 2010, the US Department of State released their annual report on Human Rights, in which they stated "On June 28, the military forcibly removed and sent into exile President Jose Manuel Zelaya, and Congress President Roberto Micheletti Bain became the leader of a de facto regime. Until the June 28 coup d'état (June coup), the country was a constitutional, multiparty democracy with a population of approximately eight million..." and "Although the coup was bloodless, subsequent related events resulted in the loss of life as well as limitations by the de facto regime on freedom of movement, association, expression, and assembly". In an official press release published in their website, the US Embassy in Tegucigalpa stated:

Before the June 28, 2009 coup d'état, Honduras faced substantial challenges in the protection of human rights, had one of the Western Hemisphere's highest homicide rates, and some killings appearing to be politically motivated. The human rights climate deteriorated significantly following the coup, especially with regard to respect for the rights of women, members of ethnic communities and sexual minorities and other vulnerable groups. While the de facto regime was in power, there were incidents resulting in loss of life, disproportionate use of force, including beatings by security forces of protestors, sexual assaults, as well as other serious human rights abuses. The de facto regime engaged in substantial interference with freedom of movement, association, expression, and assembly.

According to the US Embassy's website, they "expressed to the Honduran Attorney General, members of the security forces, and the Human Rights Ombudsman, among others, their serious concerns about reported human rights abuses".

According to the latest Greenberg Quinlar Rosler Research opinion poll during October 9–13, 48% of Hondurans regarded Micheletti's performance as good or excellent. 50% regarded his performance as bad or poor.

The 2009 general election took place, as planned, on 29 November. The National Party candidate, Porfirio Lobo Sosa, was victorious over Liberal Party candidate Elvin Santos, winning the election with 56.56% of the vote. Lobo Sosa was inaugurated as president on January 27, 2010.

=== Legislator for life ===
In January 2010 the Honduran Congress granted Micheletti the status of "legislator for life". The appointment did not make him immune from prosecution, as some international media sources stated.

== Attack on his daughter ==
On 5 November 2013 a daughter of Micheletti was shot at, but not seriously injured, while driving with her chauffeur and armed guards.

== See also ==
- Adolfo Facussé, prominent Honduran businessman, supporter of Roberto Micheletti

Political offices
Preceded by Porfirio Lobo Sosa	President of the National Congress; 2006–2009	Succeeded by José Alfredo Saavedra
Preceded by Manuel Zelaya	President of Honduras; Acting; 2009–2010	Succeeded by Porfirio Lobo Sosa
