= Felicito Ávila =

Honduran politician

Felicito Ávila is a Honduran politician. He stood as a candidate for the Christian Democratic Party of Honduras (DC) in the 2009 Honduran general election.
