= Hondutel =

Telecommunication company in Honduras

Hondutel logo

Hondutel (Empresa Hondureña de Telecomunicaciones), is the Honduras government's telecommunications company. It has a monopoly on international calls.

== History ==
=== Creation ===
The organization was created on May 7, 1976, as an autonomous organization responsible for the modernization of Honduras' telecommunication system, and to achieve a better efficiency in its administration and profitability. Hondutel was historically administered by Honduras' armed forces as telecommunications were considered a matter of national security.

=== Privatisation attempts ===
Towards the end of the 20th century, the Honduran government is pressed by the IMF to privatize Hondutel in order to benefit from debt-restructuring solutions and international financial aids. A 1995 law (Framework Law of the Telecommunications Sector) authorized 51% of the company to be sold and privately held. The push towards privatisation was also made by Jaime Rosenthal in 1992, who saw three benefits in this process : bring foreign currency in the country (mainly US dollars), to ensure transparency and accountability, and to boost innovation.

However, a 1995 audit by Price Waterhouse revealed that the company was a high-risk investment thus jeopardizing its privatisation. By 1999, a mere 4.2 lines per 100 inhabitants is accounted.

In 1998, the government is ready to proceed to the privatisation of the company, but the country is badly hit by hurricane Mitch and reviewed its priorities. Finally, by February 2000, seven companies have pre-qualified to capitalize Hondutel (including Telmex, Telefonica and France Telecom). In October 2000, the bid is launched, but only Telmex remained in the race, with a $106 million offer, which was only a third of the government's expectations. The bid was refused. In 2003, the government approved the sale of Hondutel's B band network, acquired by Megatel. In 2004, it is bought back by América Móvil, owner of Telmex.

=== Recent history ===
In June 2007, Hondutel launched its first of a series of Personal Communications Services (PCS) networks. It competes with companies such as Luxembourg's Millicom and Mexico's juggernaut América Móvil. In October, it extended to the Sula Valley, including the cities of San Pedro Sula, La Lima, Villanueva and surrounding communities. In December it extended coverage to La Ceiba.

Currently, it offers mobile phone coverage in the cities of Tegucigalpa, San Pedro Sula, La Ceiba, Olancho, Progress and Copan and surrounding areas.

The administration of President Porfirio Lobo created a commission to study the available alternatives to solve Hondutel's lack of funds. The operator needs to modernize and expand its wired infrastructure and complete its nationwide mobile footprint. Hondutel's dire financial situation has forced the government to intervene in order to provide funds to cover employees salaries. Unofficially it has been said that there are only two viable solutions for Hondutel: either finding a strategic partner that is willing to have the state as a partner shareholder or total privatization. According to an Hondutel executive, the operator needs an immediate cash injection of US$150 million to become more competitive.

During August 2013, the government announced its intention to auction two AWS mobile licenses and directly grant a third one to Hondutel. The government expects that these new spectrum concessions will be used for the deployment of LTE services. The Uruguayan government also made an offer that year, suggesting that ANTEL acquires 51% of Hondutel to develop its presence in Latin America, even though Hondutel loses $1 million a month and holds a $18 million operating deficit.

In 2015, the company grew its internet capacity by 300% to cope with the ever-rising demand. At the end of 2016, the company lowered its prices on internet offers to grow its customers base. On the other hand, Hondutel started to depreciate its nationwide landline coverage and completely shut down service in some rural areas of the country.

== Financial statements ==
Hondutel's yearly profits
Year	Profit (in HNL millions)
2011	−250
2012	−500
2013	−574
2014	
2015	80

In 2014, it was revealed by an informer from the secretary of finance that between 2000 and 2012, Hondutel informally wired 17 million of lempiras to the country's government, including 10 million in cash.

In 2015, Hondutel closed its fiscal year with a HNL 80 million profit, largely benefitting from the internet and mobile boom, along with heavy job cuts.

== Corruption scandal ==
President Manuel Zelaya appointed his nephewMarcelo Chimirri as deputy president of the state-owned Hondutel.

FBI Criminal Division's Fraud Section revealed that Latin Node Inc., an American company, had illegal dealings with Hondutel executives The affair was later reported in the Honduran media. Marcelo Chimirri unsuccessfully sued journalists for libel that had published the corruption scandal.

An unknown individual posted various recordings of high government officials on YouTube, possibly implicating them in a corruption scandal concerning Hondutel. After Zelaya made a complaint to the police, they launched an investigation to find who had made the recordings which are considered espionage and a violation of Honduras' privacy laws. The investigation included searching the home of Marcelo Chimirri and both his office at Hondutel and those of other members of staff, the former was an action condemned by Zelaya. On November 4. Marcelo Chimirri resigned from his post at Hondutel in January 2007. In January 2008 the United States embassy confirmed that Chimirri would not be allowed to enter the US.

In May 2009, U.S. Attorney General Eric Holder decided to release the names of officials A, B, and C. Honduran investigators were going to visit the United States to seek evidence collected by the United States.

Apart from Chimirri Oscar Danilo Santos (the former manager of Hondutel), Jorge Rosa, and James Lagos are all charged in connection with allegedly committing crimes of abuse of authority, fraud and bribery having received bribes of 1.09 million U.S. dollars of an international carrier in exchange for Hondutel give them lower rates than other firms. While the auditor Julio Daniel Flores was charged for the lesser crime of violation of duties of officers.

In 2012, a Florida Corporation named Suncoast successfully sued Hondutel for fraud in Suncoast Tech Corp. v. Hondutel. A judgment was awarded against Hondutel for fraud in the Federal Court, Southern District of Florida in excess of $900,000.

== See also ==
- Empresa Nacional de Energía Eléctrica
