= Juan Martínez (swimmer) =

Spanish swimmer

Personal information
- Born: September 25, 1946 (age 79) Las Palmas, Spain

Sport
- Sport: Swimming
Medal record
Representing Spain
Mediterranean Games
Gold medal – first place	1967 Tunis	4x100m freestyle relay

Juan Martínez (born 25 September 1946) is a Spanish former freestyle swimmer who competed in the 1968 Summer Olympics. He was born in Las Palmas.
