= National Popular Resistance Front =

Honduran political coalition

Flag of the National Popular Resistance Front

The National Popular Resistance Front or National People's Resistance Front (Spanish: Frente Nacional de Resistencia Popular or FNRP), frequently referred to as the National Resistance Front, is a wide coalition of Honduran grassroots organisations and political parties and movements that aims to restore elected President Manuel Zelaya and hold a constituent assembly to draw up a new constitution.

The Front originated as a popular social movement which used massive civil disobedience to support the restoration of Zelaya in replacement of the de facto President Roberto Micheletti, whose government was perceived as a dictatorship in existence since 28 June 2009, the 2009 Honduran coup d'état. The National Resistance Front pointed to Article 3 of the 1982 Constitution as a legal basis for opposing the de facto government, and argued that it constituted the organised expression of Hondurans' right, under that article, to resist a government imposed by armed force.

After the 2009 general election saw Porfirio Lobo Sosa elected President, the FNRP continued to press for a constituent assembly, and to oppose the government's human rights abuses. Human Rights Watch reported in July 2010 that under Lobo Sosa "at least eight journalists and ten members of the National Popular Resistance Front (FNRP)" had been killed.

== Aims and composition ==
The Front was originally known by a number of variants of its name – National Resistance Front against the Coup d'État in Honduras (Frente Nacional contra el Golpe de Estado en Honduras, Frente Nacional de Resistencia Contra el Golpe de Estado - FNGE) or simply the National Resistance Front (Frente Nacional de la Resistencia).

The Front is a wide coalition of workers' organisations, campesinos' organisations and other grassroots organisations, together with centrist/left-wing political parties and movements that have stated their opposition to the 2009 Honduran coup d'état. The FNRP initially supported a referendum process that should lead to a constituent assembly, later it began supporting the Liberty and Refoundation party's intention to convoke a constituent assembly immediately.

== Policies and actions ==
Frequent public statements regarding the political and human rights situation since the coup d'état occurred are made by the National Resistance Front and redistributed by many of the participating or supporting groups, e.g. the women's rights group Centro de Derechos de Mujeres de Tegucigalpa.

In response to the San José mediation meeting in Costa Rica, the National Resistance Front stated its opposition to immunity for those who had carried out the coup d'état. It also said that it "supports the continuation of referendum processes, which will eventually lead to the convocation of a national Constituent Assembly and the prior definition of the criteria and requirements for the prospective assembly members."

In early August 2009, the National Resistance Front organised a converging national march, composed of many individual marches from different parts of Honduras, with convergence in San Pedro Sula and Tegucigalpa on 11 August. As of 9 August, about five thousand marchers who had left Colón and Atlántida on 4 August arrived in El Progreso, Yoro, the town from which de facto President Roberto Micheletti originates. About eight thousand marchers from the Ocotepeque, Lempira, Copán and Santa Bárbara departments were expected to join with these marchers in San Pedro Sula on 11 August. Thousands of other marchers were expected for the Tegucigalpa convergence. The marchers declared their aims to be the restoration of elected President Manuel Zelaya and the establishment of a constituent assembly.

The paralyzed sectors included health, education, and electricity services, not to mention the closing of the four main Honduran airports.

== Attacks against the group ==
Two of the leaders of the National Resistance Front, Juan Barahona and Rafael Alegría, were briefly detained and later released by police during a demonstration against the coup d'état on 31 July 2009.

Over 30 members of the National Resistance Front have allegedly been killed since Zelaya's ouster on June 28, 2009. The first alleged death occurred on July 5, 2009 at the Toncontin Airport, when 19-year-old Isis Obed Murillo was shot and killed by the military. Over 4,000 have been allegedly detained. Some have allegedly disappeared and have not been found. One teacher disappeared after a union meeting with witnesses who said he was captured by the police. His body later appeared covered in cuts in a field. Several alleged killings took place in the middle of the night, including that of union leader and Democratic Unification Party member Roger Bados. A number of people have allegedly suffered injuries from police and military beatings and have been poisoned by tear-gassing. Some organizations around the world have warned that the human rights situation in Honduras continues to rapidly deteriorate.

Under the presidency of Porfirio Lobo Sosa, human rights in Honduras continued to suffer. According to Human Rights Watch in July 2010, "at least eight journalists and ten members of the National Popular Resistance Front (FNRP) ... have been killed since President Lobo assumed power on January 27, 2010."
