= 2009 Honduran general election =

← 2005	29 November 2009	2013 →
- Presidential election
- Turnout: 49.88% (▼5.20pp)
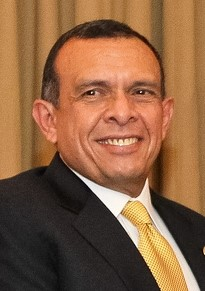

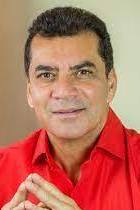
Nominee	Porfirio Lobo Sosa	Elvin Santos
Party	National	Liberal
Popular vote	1,213,695	817,524
Percentage	56.56%	38.10%
- Lobo: 40–50% 50–60% 60–70% 70–80% 80–90% >90% Santos: 40–50% 50–60% 60–70%
President before election
Roberto Micheletti
Liberal
Elected President
Porfirio Lobo Sosa
National
- Parliamentary election
- All 128 seats in the National Congress; 65 seats needed for a majority
Party	Leader	Vote %	Seats	+/–
National	Ricardo Álvarez Arias	53.37	71	+26
Liberal	Mauricio Villeda	30.78	45	−17
PINU	Carlos Sosa Coello	6.43	3	+1
CD	Lucas Evangelisto Aguilera	4.88	5	+1
UD	Matías Funes	4.51	4	−1
This lists parties that won seats. See the complete results below.
Results of the congressional election
President of the Congress before	President of the Congress after
José Alfredo Saavedra (acting); Liberal	Juan Orlando Hernández; National

General elections were held in Honduras on 29 November 2009, including presidential, parliamentary and local elections. Voters went to the polls to elect:

- A new President of Honduras to serve a four-year term starting on 27 January 2010.
- 128 members to serve a four-year term in the National Congress.
- Representatives in municipal (local) governments.

The possibility of having a "fourth ballot box" (Spanish: cuarta urna) at the 29 November election regarding the convocation of a National Constituent Assembly constituted a major element of the 2009 Honduran constitutional crisis.

== Campaigning ==
Preceding the planned November elections, the 2009 Honduran constitutional crisis (ouster of president Manuel Zelaya) occurred, bringing the legitimacy of the elections into doubt.

Campaigning by candidates took place for the three months prior to 29 November in the context of conflict between the de facto government, the de jure government, and resistance to the de facto government, mostly coordinated by the National Resistance Front.

Nearly one month of this campaign period was covered by the Micheletti de facto government Decree PCM-M-016-2009, signed on 22 September 2009 and rescinded on 19 October 2009. The decree suspended five constitutional rights: personal liberty (Article 69), freedom of expression (Article 72), freedom of movement (Article 81), habeas corpus (Article 84) and freedom of association.

Hundreds of candidates, including presidential candidate Carlos H. Reyes, renounced their candidacy citing scepticism that the same military that overthrew the elected president could be trusted to run a free and fair election five months later.

== Presidential candidates ==
The candidates of the two main political parties were former presidential candidate Porfirio Lobo Sosa of the National Party and former vice-president Elvin Santos of the Liberal Party. The trade unionist Garifuna leader Bernard Martínez Valerio was the Innovation and Unity Party (PINU) candidate. Martínez was the first black presidential candidate in the history of Honduras, according to PINU. Another trade union leader, Carlos Humberto Reyes, one of the coordinators of the Frente Nacional de Resistencia Contra el Golpe de Estado en Honduras, was an independent candidate for the election but formally withdrew in order not to legitimise the coup d'état and what he and his supporters perceived would be fraudulent elections.

The table below shows all six continuing and withdrawn candidates, in the order published by the Supreme Electoral Tribunal.

Candidate	Party/Independent
Porfirio Lobo Sosa	National Party
Bernard Martínez	Innovation and Unity Party-Social-Democracy (PINU)
Felicito Ávila	Christian Democrat Party (CD)
Elvin Santos	Liberal Party
César Ham	Democratic Unification Party (PUD)
Carlos H. Reyes	Independent (withdrew 9 November on grounds of alleged election illegitimacy and fraud)

=== Opinion polls ===
A pre-election poll conducted between 23 and 29 August 2009 by COIMER & OP showed a relative majority (41%) who would not declare a voting preference or would not vote in favour of any of the six candidates. By mid-October this had dropped to a minority (29%) according to a CID-Gallup poll. Porfirio Lobo's support increased from 28% in August to 37% in October, and Elvin Santos' support increased from 14% to 21%. According to the two polls, Carlos H. Reyes' support dropped from 12% to 6%, while the other three candidates increased from 1–2% support in August to 2–3% in October. A popularity rating question in the COIMER & OP August poll, concerning positive, average and negative opinions towards presidential candidates and other prominent people, found that Porfirio Lobo had more negative than positive popularity (34% versus 30%), as did Elvin Santos (45% versus 19%) and the de facto President Roberto Micheletti (56% versus 16%) and César Ham (20% versus 16%). Carlos H. Reyes had more positive than negative ratings (25% versus 14%), as did de jure President Manuel Zelaya (45% versus 26%).

polling organisation, [ref]	date	poll details	candidate						
polling organisation, [ref]	date	poll details	Porfirio Lobo	Bernard Martínez	Felicito Ávila	Elvin Santos	César Ham	Carlos Reyes (withdrew 9 Nov)	(other response)
CID-Gallup	13–19 October 2009	national; 1420 people	37%	2%	2%	21%	3%	6%	29%
COIMER & OP	23–29 August 2009	national; 1470 people	28%	1%	1%	14%	2%	12%	41%
CID-Gallup	30 June–4 July 2009	national; 1204 people	42%	–	–	37%	–	–	–

== Conduct ==
Over thirty thousand security personnel were involved in running the election, including 12,000 military, 14,000 police officers and 5000 reservists. Mayors were requested by the army to provide lists of "enemies" (Spanish: enemigos) of the electoral process in order to "neutralise" them (Spanish: neutralizarlos).

Amnesty International protested to the Honduran de facto government about violations of habeas corpus on 28 and 29 November. One of the people who were disappeared was Jensys Mario Umanzor Gutierrez, last seen in police detention early on the morning of 30 November. Amnesty International (AI) stated that no courts, including the Supreme Court, were available to receive a petition for habeas corpus. AI also referred to two men arrested under terrorism charges and beaten, and 14 minors detained under decree PCM-M-016-2009 for gathering in groups of more than four persons, and later freed without charges. AI also said that human rights organizations in Honduras "suffered attacks and acts of intimidation".

On election day, police and military suppressed an anti-election rally in San Pedro Sula, with reports of one death plus injuries and arrests. There were also reports that employees of government agencies and private businesses were being told that they would be fired if they did not vote.

The European Parliament did not send observers. However, observers were sent by the centre-right European People's Party, who reported a "high degree of civic maturity and exemplar democratic behaviour" during the elections.

Despite few outside legal observers, the International Republican Institute and the National Democratic Institute were there as American observers. The IRI supported the projections of 61% from the interim government and the Supreme Electoral Tribunal. The NDI has so far not commented on their projection of the vote turnout, however have commented on an independent, local Honduran observer part-funded by USAID, the Hagamos Democracia who put the turnout on 48%. The NDI commented that they had a low margin of error on what percentage of the votes were allocated to the candidates as they had successfully projected the vote's outcome: 56 percent for Lobo and 38 percent for Santos. He also said a 48 percent turnout would be consistent with a trend of increasing abstention in Honduras. Turnout was 55 percent in the 2005 election that brought Zelaya to office, 10 percentage points lower than in the previous election. Official turnout was revised down to 49%, a figure consistent with the TSE's own internal figures on election day but over which it had preferred to announce the entirely unfounded but rather more politically convenient 61%, as was caught on video at the time. 49% incidentally, is also a decline on the 55% 2005 election turnout.

== Results ==
=== President ===
Porfirio Lobo Sosa, popularly known as Pepe Lobo, of the opposition conservative National Party was elected to succeed Micheletti. Early reports gave Lobo over 50% of the popular vote, with Elvin Santos the closest opponent with around 35%. While some regional nations did not accept the election as valid, others including the United States have supported its legitimacy. While exiled President Manuel Zelaya called for a boycott of the election, turnout ranged from around 30% in poorer areas to 70% in more wealthy communities. Lobo hinted that charges against Zelaya would be dropped.

Candidate	Party	Votes	%
Porfirio Lobo Sosa	National Party	1,213,695	56.56
Elvin Santos	Liberal Party	817,524	38.10
Bernard Martínez Valerio	Innovation and Unity Party	39,960	1.86
Felicito Ávila	Christian Democratic Party	38,413	1.79
César Ham	Democratic Unification Party	36,420	1.70
Total		2,146,012	100.00
Valid votes		2,146,012	93.30
Invalid/blank votes		154,044	6.70
Total votes		2,300,056	100.00
Registered voters/turnout		4,611,211	49.88
Source: NDI

=== National Congress ===
Party	Votes	%	Seats	+/–
National Party	8,561,577	53.37	71	+16
Liberal Party	4,937,995	30.78	45	–17
Innovation and Unity Party	1,031,218	6.43	3	+1
Christian Democratic Party	782,551	4.88	5	+1
Democratic Unification Party	723,744	4.51	4	–1
Independent People's Progressive Movement	3,545	0.02	0	New
Total	16,040,630	100.00	128	0
Valid votes	2,146,012	93.30		
Invalid/blank votes	154,044	6.70		
Total votes	2,300,056	100.00		
Source: TSE, IFES

== Reactions ==
Organisations and individuals in Honduras, including the National Resistance Front against the coup d'État in Honduras, Marvin Ponce of the Democratic Unification Party, and Bertha Oliva of Comité de Familiares de Detenidos Desaparecidos en Honduras, and internationally, including Mercosur, President Cristina Kirchner of Argentina and the Union of South American Nations, said that elections held on 29 November under Micheletti would not be recognized.

=== Honduras ===
Hundreds of people made a noisy drive-by protest in Tegucigalpa on 1 December to symbolise their rejection of the elections and to highlight that the turnout estimates of over 60% were inaccurate. Zelaya's aide Carlos Reina called for the elections to be cancelled.

In early November 2009, Dagoberto Suazo of the National Resistance Front against the coup d'État in Honduras asked for the international community to continue to refuse to recognise the planned 29 November elections. Marvin Ponce, a member of Congress from the Democratic Unification Party, said that it was not possible to hold the elections in the aftermath of the coup d'état. Bertha Oliva of COFADEH criticised the United States government for stating that Honduras could hold "free elections in less than three weeks" when "Hondurans [were being] subjected to arbitrary arrest, the closure of independent media, police beatings, torture and even killings by security forces". Oliva claimed that it was not possible to have an election campaign when the right to freedom of assembly, freedom of movement and press freedom were absent. She called for elections to be delayed until at least three months after human rights and democracy are restored.

On 6 November 2009, following the failure of Micheletti and Zelaya to create a "unity cabinet", Zelaya called for a boycott of the 29 November election.

On 9 November 2009, following a national meeting of leaders of the National Resistance Front against the coup d'état, presidential candidate Carlos H. Reyes declared the withdrawal of his candidacy, on the grounds of not legitimising the coup d'état and fraudulent elections. At the time of Reyes' withdrawal, the Honduran newspapers El Tiempo and La Tribuna showed Reyes' right hand in a plaster cast due to an injury sustained during his 30 July beating by Honduran security forces under the control of the de facto Micheletti government. At least 30–40 candidates from various parties and independent candidates, including at least one National Party candidate, Mario Medrano in San Manuel, Cortés, also withdraw in protest. Mario Medrano stated that he withdrew his candidature in order not to legitimise the coup d'état, that this was independent of party membership, and that anyone elected could be removed [if the coup d'état remained legitimate].

Canadian investigative journalist Jesse Freeston released a series of three videos before and after the elections them of being "coup laundering". In the final video, "Honduran Elections Exposed", Freeston separately interviews two members of the Honduran Supreme Electoral Tribunal. The engineer in charge of the count says that 49% of Hondurans had turned out to vote. Meanwhile, the spokesman for the tribunal told Freeston that roughly 65% had turned out. Freeston concludes that nobody knows how many Hondurans turned out, since all four major international election observers (UN, EU, Carter Center, and OAS) all refused to participate. The videos also exposed the police attack on an anti-election protest in San Pedro Sula, the arrest of a man for possession of anti-election posters in Tegucigalpa, a letter the military sent to all the mayors in Honduras seeking contact information of anyone involved in the National People's Resistance Front, the shutting down of anti-coup media outlets Radio Globo and Canal 36, and the targeted assassinations of anti-coup community organizers.

=== International ===
International response to the 2009 Honduran elections Honduras Countries recognizing the elections Countries not recognizing the elections No response.

Mercosur declared on 24 July 2009 that it would not recognise the results of the planned November elections or any other elections organised under Micheletti. President Cristina Kirchner of Argentina stated, "We must condemn any benevolent coup attempt, that is, when through a civilian-military coup legitimate authorities are ousted followed by attempts to legalize the situation by calling new elections. This would be the death kiss for the OAS democratic charter and turning the Mercosur democratic charter in mere fiction". On 10 August, the Union of South American Nations (UNASUR) also declared that it would not recognise the results of elections held while the de facto Micheletti government remained in power. On 17 August, President Felipe Calderón of Mexico, together with Brazilian President Luiz Inácio Lula da Silva, made a similar statement. On September 3, the US State Department issued a statement revoking all non-humanitarian assistance to Honduras and said, of the November 29 elections "At this moment, we would not be able to support the outcome of the scheduled elections".

The U.S. has since changed position and announced that it will recognize the results of the election as a part of the San Jose-Tegucigalpa Accord. Prior to the elections, the OAS advanced a resolution that would have refused to recognize its results. Initially, the U.S. administration pushed for the return of Zelaya, however, subsequently back-tracked on a threat not to recognize the election. The OAS resolution was ultimately blocked by the United States. The U.S. State Department rejected appeals by other Organization of American States (OAS) member nations to condemn what many perceived to be a fraudulent election and, instead, declared the contest "free, fair and transparent." The International Republican Institute, an organization linked to the United States Republican Party, also declared the elections had been "free of violence and overt acts of intimidation". The victory of Porfirio Lobo Sosa was quickly recognized by the United States, which increased military and police aid to the government, despite much of Latin America continuing to view him as an illegal pretender to the Honduran presidency.

In the days preceding the elections, Israel, Italy, Colombia, Panama, Peru, Germany, Costa Rica and Japan also announced their intentions to recognize the results of the elections.

On 30 November at the 19th Ibero-American Summit in Estoril, Portugal the governments of Argentina, Bolivia, Brazil, Chile, Cuba, Ecuador, Guatemala, Nicaragua, Paraguay, Spain, Uruguay, and Venezuela announced they would not recognize the elections whereas Colombia, Costa Rica and Panama said that they would. On 7 December the five Mercosur member states once again ratified their decision of not recognizing the election of Porfirio Lobo.
