= Juan Ramón Martínez (politician) =

Honduran writer, columnist, analyst and former politician

Juan Ramón Martinez (born 1941 in Olanchito) is a Honduran writer, columnist, analyst and former politician. He was a presidential candidate for the 2005 general elections, representing the Christian Democratic Party of Honduras. Currently he is a columnist in the newspaper La Tribuna.

He received the Ramón Rosa National Literature Award in 2016.
