= Constitution of Honduras =

Fundamental law of Honduras

The Political Constitution of the Republic of Honduras (Spanish: Constitución Política de la República de Honduras) was approved on 11 January 1982, published on 20 January 1982, amended by the National Congress of Honduras 26 times from 1984 to 2005, and 10 interpretations by Congress were made from 1982 to 2005. It is Honduras' twelfth constitution since independence in 1838. Previous charters were adopted in 1839, 1848, 1865, 1873, 1880, 1894, 1906, 1924, 1936, 1957 and 1965.

The Constitution of Honduras gained notoriety because of the 2009 Honduran constitutional crisis that removed President Manuel Zelaya and saw Roberto Micheletti take his place. In 2009, Óscar Arias, then President of Costa Rica, who had been asked by the US State Department to help arbitrate the crisis, termed the Honduran constitution the "worst in the entire world" and an "invitation to coups."

== Early history ==
=== 1838–1981 ===
Honduras broke away from the Central American Federation in October 1838 and became an independent sovereign state. However, in the 1840s and 1850s Honduras participated in several conferences Central American Union, which did not work, such as the Confederation of Central America (1842–1845), the covenant of Guatemala (1842), the Diet of Sonsonate (1846) and National Representation in Central America (1849–1852). It later adopted the name of Republic of Honduras.

In 1847 the National Autonomous University of Honduras (public) was founded during the administration of President-elect John Lindo; it taught civil law, philosophy and literature, among others.

In 1860, after his defeat in Nicaragua, Trujillo came to the U.S. (former president of Nicaragua) William Walker influenced by the ambiguous Monroe Doctrine ( "America for Americans"). After deviating from his initial goal was the Bay Islands and the Mosquito, which previously belonged to Britain, barricaded himself in the Fortress of San Fernando in Omoa and was shot in Trujillo on 12 September 1860, during the presidential General Jose Santos Guardiola, who was assassinated two years later, before the end of his term.

Marco Aurelio Soto came to power in 1876 and implemented liberal reforms in the country. These reforms in administrative, political, economic, and social development attempted to radically change the disastrous situation Honduras was experiencing. Soto managed to improve lines of communication and other services. He oversaw the construction of railroad sections, expanded the telegraph system, and launched an education program unprecedented in the country. Despite the progress made during his administration, Honduras once again fell into social instability because it lacked products such as coffee or tobacco on which to build a stable economy.

During the second half of the nineteenth century Honduras continued to participate in diplomatic efforts to restore political unity of Central America, and conference of The Union (1872) and Guatemala (1876). On 1 November 1898, the Greater Republic changed its name to Central America, but these were dissolved on 30 November and Honduras resumed its sovereignty.

=== Constitution of 11 January 1982 ===
Following several decades of military governments, a constituent assembly prepared a new constitution, agreed on it on 11 January 1982 and published it on 20 January 1982 in the official journal "La Gaceta". Since then, the National Congress of Honduras made 26 amendments (ratified in 1984, 1986, 1987 (twice), 1988 (twice), 1990, 1991, 1995 (twice), 1996, 1998, 1999 (three times), 2000, 2001, 2002, 2003 (four times), 2004 (twice) and 2005 (twice) and 10 interpretations from 1982 to 2005.

The 13th amendment to the Constitution was voted by Congress on 30 September 1998, to make the President commander in chief of the armed forces. The amendment was ratified by Congress by a vote of 128-0 on 26 January 1999 and signed by President Flores. This ended 42 years of military autonomy; the military had previously been governed by a military parliament and a commander in chief from the armed forces.

== Constituent assembly controversy ==
=== From 2006 to 28 June 2009 ===
Starting in 2006 and leading to the 2009 Honduran constitutional crisis and removal of Zelaya, debate occurred in Honduran society regarding the creation of a constituent assembly in order to rewrite the constitution, with support from many groups. President Manuel Zelaya played an important role in the debate and was arrested and exiled to Costa Rica by military officers on 28 June 2009. Whether or not it is constitutionally valid to hold a constituent assembly was a controversial issue, since Article 374 contains entrenched clauses regarding Article 373 and Article 374 itself, and Article 373 as interpreted by Decree 169/1986 defines the method of modifying the constitution:

Article 373.- The reform of this Constitution may be ordered by the National Congress, in regular sessions, with two-thirds of votes of all of its members. The decree brought to the effect on the article or articles to be reformed, must be ratified by the subsequent regular parliamentary session of an equal number of votes, to enter into force.

A wide range of social organisations and some political parties coordinated together as the Frente Nacional de Resistencia contra el Golpe de Estado en Honduras. In response to an international mediation meeting held in San Jose in Costa Rica in relation to the removal of the President, in which Zelaya would accept to take no actions that could lead towards a constituent assembly, the FNGE declared that it "strongly [supports] the continuation of processes for participatory democracy, which will eventually lead to the convocation of the National Constituent Assembly and the prior definition of the criteria and requirements for the women and men who will be its members." On 28 August, in response to the nearing date of the Honduran general and presidential elections that are planned to be held on 29 November 2009, FNGE declared its concerns regarding the electoral process and again called for a "popular, participatory, inclusive, non-discriminatory and democratic" constituent assembly to be held.

Following the removal of Zelaya, women's groups in Honduras, in particular Feminists in Resistance, have strongly supported the aim of holding a constituent assembly. Bertha Cáceres of the Civic Council of Popular and Indigenous Organizations of Honduras (COPINH) and the Frente Nacional de Resistencia Contra el Golpe de Estado en Honduras said that a constituent assembly would be important in order to defend women's rights. She stated, "For the first time we would be able to establish a precedent for the emancipation of women, to begin to break these forms of domination. The current constitution never mentions women, not once, so to establish our human rights, our reproductive, sexual, political, social, and economic rights as women would be to really confront this system of domination."

On 31 August 2009, following the "XVIII National Gathering of Afro-Honduran Youth of the Organization for Ethnic and Community Development (ODECO)," Afro-Honduran youth leaders from several dozen different towns and cities made a declaration, of which some of the aims were the "immediate implementation of the right to plebiscite and referendum" and the convocation of a plebiscite in order to organise a constituent assembly that would write a new constitution. The youth leaders called for the plebiscite to be held on the "last Sunday of November of 2010" and for "clear guarantees for wider and more representative participation among all sectors of the Honduran people".

== Debate about the constitutionality of the 2009 presidential ouster ==
The constitutionality of the removal of Zelaya from Honduras on 28 June 2009 was controversial.

=== Articles of the 1982 Constitution ===
Several articles of the 1982 Constitution that were referred to during the crisis include the following.

Article 3 of the Constitution states that nobody has an obligation to obey a government that has taken power through armed force, that acts by such a government are [legally] null, and that people have the right to insurrection in order to defend constitutional government. The Constitution forbids handing over or expatriating Hondurans to foreign countries. A Honduran citizen who has held the title of Executive can not be President or Vice President of the Republic, and the person that breaks this regulation or proposes its amendment, as well as those who assist him directly or indirectly, will cease immediately to hold their respective offices, and will be disqualified for ten years from holding any public office.

Article 373 states, "The reform of the Constitution can be decreed by the National Congress, in ordinary session, by a vote of two thirds the totality of its members, and must specify the article or articles that are to be reformed, and must be ratified by an equal number of votes in the subsequent ordinary legislature." Article 374 states, "It is not possible to reform, in any case, the preceding article, the present article, the constitutional articles referring to the form of government, to the national territory, to the presidential period, the prohibition to serve again as President of the Republic, the citizen who has performed under any title in consequence of which she/he cannot be President of the Republic in the subsequent period."

=== References to the 1982 Constitution ===
In the crisis, President Manuel Zelaya was removed from the country by military force on the 28th of June after the Supreme Court of Honduras had issued an order (apparently) on June 26 for his detention. The Supreme Court membership had been renewed in January 2009. Afterwards the court published a Special Communication explaining its actions. The validity of the court's ruling has been challenged. Some have complained that the court is partisan. Larry Birns, director of the Washington-based Council on Hemispheric Affairs, has described the Honduran Supreme Court as "one of the most corrupt institutions in Latin America." The national Congress claims to have affirmed the Supreme Court's ruling by a vote of 125 to 3, in a show of hands on the day Zelaya was removed, 28 June 2009. The Unión Democrática members, however, say they were not there, and some Liberal Party members have since said they did not vote for the motion.

President Zelaya disputes that he was seeking to extend his term in office, arguing that he wanted to conduct a public opinion poll on whether a constitutional convention should be convened to consider various constitutional changes including allowing successive terms in office for the president.

On the annual Central American Independence Day, 15 September 2009, the National Resistance Front Against the Coup d'état in Honduras declared that the National Resistance Front constitutes the organised expression of Hondurans' right under Article 3 of the 1982 Constitution to resist against a government imposed by armed force.

== Decree PCM-M-016-2009 ==
From 22 September 2009 to 19 October 2009, five constitutional rights were suspended in the Micheletti de facto government's Decree PCM-M-016-2009: personal liberty (Article 69), freedom of expression (Article 72), freedom of movement (Article 81), habeas corpus (Article 84) and freedom of association. On 29 September, one day after the decree was used to shut down the television stations Channel 36 and Radio Globo, the Office of the Special Rapporteur for Freedom of Expression of the Inter-American Commission of Human Rights (IAHCR) "expressed its most energetic rejection" of PCM-M-016-2009 and asked for the immediate suspension of its enforcement, because according to the IACHR, it "flagrantly [contradicted] the international standards for freedom of expression".

== 2021 Amendments ==
In 2021, the Hernández government made amendments to the constitution to permanently prohibit abortion and define marriage as "between a man and a woman", while increasing the voting threshold above that needed to amend a standard constitutional provision. The change was condemned by UN human rights experts.

== See also ==
- Politics of Honduras
