= Porfirio Lobo Sosa =

37th President of Honduras (2010–2014)

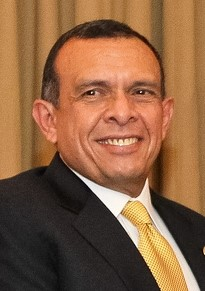
- Lobo Sosa in December 2011.

37th President of Honduras
- In office 27 January 2010 – 27 January 2014
- Vice President: María Antonieta de Bográn (2010–2014); Samuel Armando Reyes (2010–2014); Victor Hugo Barnica (2010–2013)
- Preceded by: Roberto Micheletti
- Succeeded by: Juan Orlando Hernández

President of the National Congress
- In office 25 January 2002 – 25 January 2006
- Preceded by: Rafael Pineda Ponce
- Succeeded by: Roberto Micheletti

Deputy of the Olancho Department
- In office 25 January 1990 – 25 January 2006

Personal details
- Born: 22 December 1947 (age 78) Trujillo, Honduras
- Party: National Party
- Spouse: Rosa Elena Bonilla
- Education: University of Miami (BBA); Patrice Lumumba University (PhD)

Porfirio Lobo Sosa (born 22 December 1947) also known by his nickname, Pepe Lobo, is a Honduran former politician, business administrator, and agricultural landowner who served as 37th President of Honduras from 27 January 2010 to 27 January 2014. A member of the conservative National Party and a former deputy in the National Congress of Honduras from 25 January 1990, he was president of the National Congress of Honduras from 25 January 2002 to 25 January 2006. He came second to Manuel Zelaya with 46% of the vote in the 2005 general election. After the military ousted Zelaya in a coup d'état, Lobo was elected president in the 2009 presidential election and took office on 27 January 2010.

== Early life and education ==
Lobo was born on 22 December 1947 in Trujillo and grew up on the ranch of La Empalizada near Juticalpa, Olancho. His parents are Porfirio José Lobo López and Rosa Sosa Hernández de Lobo; both are deceased. His father served as deputy in the National Congress in 1957 and was a political leader in the department of Olancho. His brother Ramón Rosa Lobo Sosa is a deputy in the National Congress for the department of Colón.

After attending a Catholic school in Juticalpa, Lobo continued his studies at the San Francisco Institute of Tegucigalpa and then at the University of Miami in Coral Gables, Florida in the United States. After obtaining his Bachelor of Business Administration from the University of Miami School of Business, Lobo returned to Honduras to work in the family's agricultural business and to teach political economy and English at the La Fraternidad Institute in Juticalpa for 11 years. He was granted a doctorate from Patrice Lumumba University in Moscow. He also obtained a black belt in taekwondo.

== Political career ==
Lobo's political career started at the age of 19 as a political leader in Olancho. For 31 years, he presided over the national party's youth in Olancho, local committee of Juticalpa and the departmental committee of Olancho.

He was in charge of the Honduran corporation for forestry development, from 1990 to 1994. He was elected to the national congress in 1990, where he later served as president, from 2002 to 2006.

=== 2005 general election ===
Lobo was the National Party of Honduras' candidate for 27 November 2005 presidential election; Mario Canahuati was his running mate. His campaign was based on job security, a tough stance on crime, and being in favour of reintroducing the death penalty. He came in second in the presidential election with 46.17% of the vote against 49.90% from his rival Manuel Zelaya of the Liberal Party of Honduras. He held the position of president of the National Party of Honduras.

=== 2009 constitutional crisis and general election ===
In December 2008, he once again became the presidential candidate of the PNH and on 29 November 2009 he was elected President of Honduras with 56% of the vote against 38% for his rival Elvin Santos.

Following his victory, Lobo said his administration will "begin the great national dialogue". He also promised to encourage private investment to generate employment and to increase social benefits in a country where 70% of its 7 million citizens live in poverty.

== Presidency (2010–2014) ==
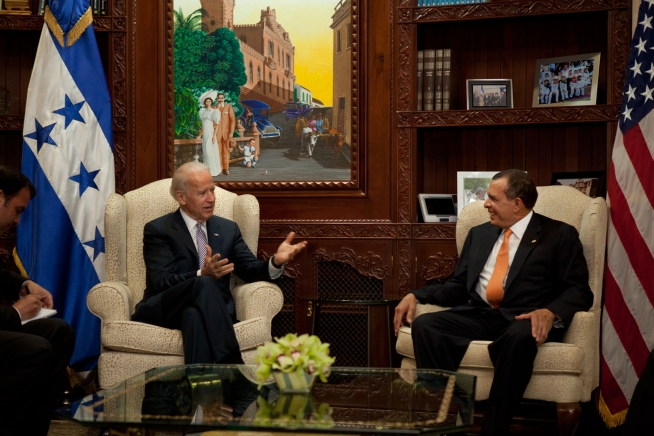
Sosa with U.S. Vice President Joe Biden in Tegucigalpa, 6 March 2012

President Lobo dismantled Manuel Zelaya's social reforms in favour of a more liberal economic policy: derogation of Decree 18–2008, which gave land to peasants, suspension of the minimum wage, adoption of the Temporary Employment Law (which allows workers to be hired "by the hour", thus preventing their possible unionisation and access to social rights), reform of the status of teachers and partial privatisation of education, and a law on the concession of natural resources, which allows resources such as water to be auctioned off.

Human Rights Watch argued that "at least eight journalists and ten members of the National Popular Resistance Front (FNRP)—a political group that opposed the 2009 removal from office of the then president and advocated the reinstatement of the ousted president, Manuel Zelaya — have been killed since Lobo assumed power on January 27, 2010". Human Rights Watch has also reported attacks on the independence of the judiciary and public prosecutors. The Obama administration, however, praised Lobo for his attempts at reconciliation, which include forming a truth commission to investigate events surrounding the removal from office as well as appointing a human rights adviser and political opponents to his government. His presidency was also marked by violent conflicts between landless peasants and large landowners. In Bajo Aguán, 35 peasants were murdered between January 2010 and July 2011 by militias financed by the landowners.

Honduras became the only country in the world to ban the morning-after pill in 2012.

The project of the American economist Paul Romer, which consists of building "private cities" on parts of the national territory where almost all the regulations would be given to investors and not to the Honduran state, is accepted by the government of Porfirio Lobo. The national constitution is amended to this effect in February 2011. In the event that a subsequent government wishes to revisit this project, a decree states: "The systems instituted in the REDs [special development regions] must be (...) approved by the National Congress with a qualified two-thirds majority", with the understanding that "this constitutional status may only be modified, interpreted or overturned by the same majority, after consultation by referendum of the population living in the RED". The management of the Inter-American Development Bank (IDB) was enthusiastic and promised to support it. Following a complaint of "treason to the homeland" to the Supreme Court of Justice by opponents of the project, the project was finally declared unconstitutional and rejected by the Court.

According to the Mexican agency Consulta Mitofsky, Porfirio Lobo's popularity in 2012 was only 14%, which made him the second most unpopular leader in Latin America at the time, after Costa Rican then-President Laura Chinchilla.

Porfirio Lobo's presidency has not brought an end to the country's problems of violence, where the homicide rate in 2013 remains the highest in the world. According to the UN Economic Commission for Latin America and the Caribbean (ECLAC), Honduras is the country on the continent where poverty and inequality are growing the most.

== U.S. drug trafficking case against Fabio Lobo ==
Lobo Sosa's son, Fabio Lobo (born in 1971), was arrested in Haiti in a U.S. Drug Enforcement Administration sting operation in 2015 and was sentenced in September 2017 in the federal court for the Southern District of New York to 24 years in prison for conspiring to import cocaine into the United States. He pleaded guilty in May 2016.

== Criminal case against wife ==
On 20 August 2019, Lobo's wife, and former Honduran first lady, Rosa Elena Bonilla was found guilty following a criminal trial. Bonilla was found guilty of three counts of misappropriation and eight counts of fraud, but would also be acquitted for charges involving money laundering and embezzlement of public funds. On 4 September 2019, Lobo's wife was sentenced to 58 years in prison. This sentence included 10 years for the misappropriation charges and 6 years for each fraud charge, in addition to a fine of 1.2 million lempiras - 10% of the appropriated value - and the confiscation of property and the total value of the fraud.

In March 2020, the Supreme Court of Honduras would Bonilla's conviction and order a new trial. On 17 March 2022, the date of her new trial, the Supreme Court of Honduras found Lobo's wife guilty on one count of continuous fraud and misappropriation as an author. On 20 September 2022, a Honduran court sentenced Bonilla to 14 years in prison for charges of fraud and misappropriation of funds destined for social programs. She would found to have spent some 12.2 million lempiras (then worth around $590,000) meant for low-income children on personal credit card payments, her children's school fees and real estate construction, according to the public ministry.

== Corruption allegations ==
In July 2016, the National Anti-Corruption Council called for an investigation into the alleged misuse of public funds for the purchase of school materials by Rosa Elena de Lobo, wife of Porforio Lobo, and her private secretary. The former first lady is also facing charges of falsifying documents. She was incarcerated in February 2018 for diverting $4 million from the state to her personal account. This is the first time in Honduras that a high-ranking public figure has been placed in prison for corruption. Half a dozen properties of the presidential couple could be seized by judicial authorities.

On 2 October 2019, the trial in the United States of Juan Antonio Tony Hernández, former deputy and brother of Honduran President Juan Orlando Hernández, arrested at Miami airport in November 2018, begins. Juan Antonio is accused of drug trafficking — specifically of exporting several tons of cocaine to the US — possession of weapons, and of being linked to the murders of two rival drug traffickers in 2011 and 2013; the scandal becomes political as President Juan Orlando Hernández and his predecessor ex-President Porfirio Lobo are suspected of having used drug money to finance their 2009 and 2013 election campaigns.

His name appeared in 2021 in the Pandora Papers. He, his wife, and their son are mentioned as owners of companies registered in tax havens. Some of them were created while he was president of Honduras.

== Personal life ==
Lobo's son Saíd Omar Lobo Bonilla was shot dead on 14 July 2022. At this point in time, was acknowledged that another of Lobo's sons, Cristian Javier Lobo, had also died as well from alcohol poisoning.

== See also ==
- Honduran Social Security Institute

Political offices
Preceded by Rafael Pineda Ponce	President of the National Congress; 2002–2006	Succeeded by Roberto Micheletti
Preceded by Roberto Micheletti	President of Honduras; 2010–2014	Succeeded by Juan Orlando Hernández
Party political offices
Preceded by Ricardo Maduro	National Party nominee for President of Honduras; 2005, 2009	Succeeded by Juan Orlando Hernández
