= Manuel Zelaya =

President of Honduras from 2006 to 2009

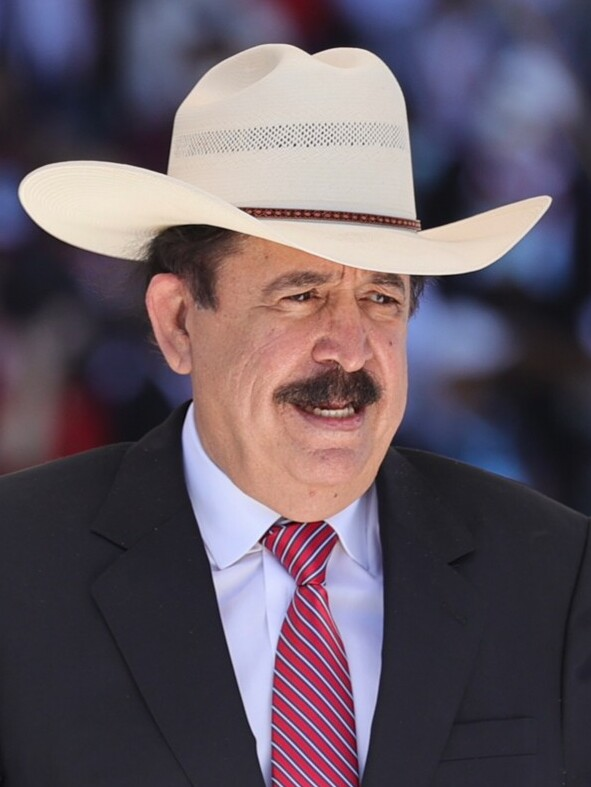
- Zelaya in 2022

General Secretary of Libre
- Incumbent
- Assumed office 26 June 2011
- Preceded by: Party established

35th President of Honduras
- In office 27 January 2006 – 28 June 2009
- Vice President: Elvin Ernesto Santos (2006–2008); Arístides Mejía (2009)
- Preceded by: Ricardo Maduro
- Succeeded by: Roberto Micheletti (interim) (Note: Manuel Zelaya was deposed on 28 June 2009 and the National Congress swore in Roberto Micheletti.)

Advisor to the President
- In office 27 January 2022 – 27 January 2026
- President: Xiomara Castro

First Gentleman of Honduras
- In role 27 January 2022 – 27 January 2026
- President: Xiomara Castro
- Preceded by: Ana García Carías (as First Lady)
- Succeeded by: Lissette del Cid (as First Lady)

Deputy of the Olancho Department
- In office 25 January 2014 – 25 January 2018
- In office 25 January 1986 – 25 January 1998

Personal details
- Born: José Manuel Zelaya Rosales; 20 September 1952 (age 74) Catacamas, Olancho, Honduras
- Party: Liberal Party (1970–2011); LIBRE (2011–present)
- Spouse: Xiomara Castro (m. 1976)
- Children: 4 (including Xiomara)
- Education: National Autonomous University of Honduras (Incomplete)

José Manuel Zelaya Rosales (born 20 September 1952) is a Honduran politician who served as the 35th president of Honduras from 2006 until his forcible removal in the 2009 coup d'état; and as the inaugural first gentleman of Honduras from 2022 until 2026. He is the eldest son of a wealthy businessman, and inherited his father's nickname "Mel". Before entering politics he was involved in his family's logging and timber businesses.

Elected as a liberal, Zelaya shifted to the political left during his presidency, forging an alliance with the Bolivarian Alliance for the Americas known as ALBA. On 28 June 2009, during the 2009 Honduran constitutional crisis, he was seized by the military and sent to Costa Rica in a coup d'état.

On 21 September 2009, he returned to Honduras clandestinely and resurfaced in the Brazilian embassy in Tegucigalpa. In 2010, he left Honduras for the Dominican Republic, an exile that lasted more than a year.

He now represents Honduras as a deputy of the Central American Parliament. Since January 1976 Zelaya has been married to Xiomara Castro, the former President of Honduras, elected in the 2021 general election. Upon his wife's inauguration, Zelaya became the first "First Gentleman" in Honduran history.

== Background ==
Zelaya was born the eldest of four children in Juticalpa, Olancho. Two of his brothers remain alive. Zelaya's mother, Ortensia Rosales de Zelaya, has been described as his best campaigner. His family first lived in Copán, then they moved east to Catacamas, Olancho.

He attended Niño Jesús de Praga y Luis Landa elementary school and the Instituto Salesiano San Miguel. He began his university studies in civil engineering, but left in 1976 with 11 courses completed, for agriculture and the forestry sector. He was forced to take over the family business by the arrest of his father José Manuel Zelaya Ordoñez, implicated in the murders known as "Slaughter of the Horcones." These murders also involved Mayor José Enrique Chinchilla, Sub-Lieutenant Benjamín Plata, José Manuel Zelaya Ordoñez (property owner) and Carlos Bhar. They were charged and taken to the Central Prison; after four years in prison, they were favored with a pardon from the head of state, General Policarpo Paz García, in 1979. He has engaged in business activities, including timber and cattle, handed down to him by his late father. He is now a landowner in Olancho. In 1987, Zelaya became manager of the Honduran Council of Private Enterprise (COHEP), as well as of the National Association of Wood Processing Enterprises. The COHEP occupies a particularly important role in Honduran politics, as the Constitution delineates that the organization elects one of the seven members of the Nominating Board that proposes nominees to the Supreme Court of Honduras.

Zelaya's father received a 20-year prison sentence for his role in the 1975 Los Horcones massacre, which took place on the Zelaya family ranch, Los Horcones. As a result of an amnesty, he served less than two.

== Political career ==
Zelaya joined the Liberal Party of Honduras, Partido Liberal de Honduras, (PLH) in 1970 and became active a decade later. He was a deputy in the National Congress for three consecutive times between 1985 and 1998. He held a number of positions within the PLH and was Minister for Investment in charge of the Honduran Social Investment Fund (HSIF) in a previous PLH government. In the 2005 presidential primaries, his faction was called Movimiento Esperanza Liberal (MEL). He received 52% of the 289,300 Liberal votes, vs. 17% for Jaime Rosenthal Oliva and 12% for Gabriela Núñez, the candidate of the Nueva Mayoría faction. Zelaya won the general election of 27 November with 918,669 votes, which accounted for 49.9% of voters, defeating the National party candidate Porfirio Lobo Sosa, who received 46.22% of the votes. (Note: Zelaya narrowly won the election after a blitz of advertising against the front-runner National party candidate, Pepe Lobo, by the American entrepreneur Allen Andersson. Andersson estimated that he spent $2 million to influence the outcome of the 2005 election.)

== Presidency (2006–2009) ==
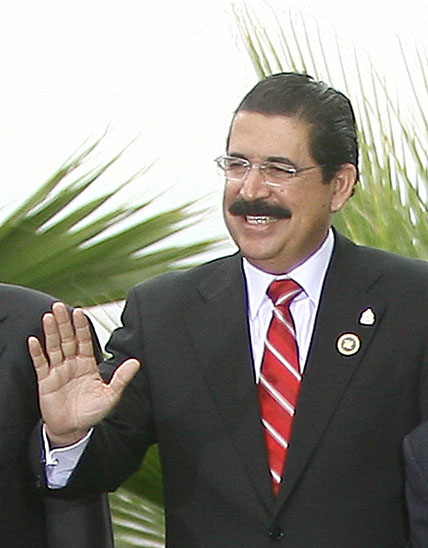
Manuel Zelaya in 2007.

During Zelaya's time in office, Honduras became a member of ALBA, an international cooperation organization based on the idea of social, political, and economic integration between the countries of Latin America and the Caribbean. It marked his turning to left-of-center politics, the first such case of right to left policy switch as he had been elected in on a conservative platform. Political opponents, particularly business elites, opposed his foreign policy, including his alliance with Hugo Chávez in Venezuela, and friendship with Cuba's Raúl Castro.

In spite of a number of economic problems, there were a number of significant achievements under Zelaya's presidency. Under his government, free education for all children was introduced, subsidies to small farmers were provided, bank interest rates were reduced, the minimum wage was increased by 80%, school meals were guaranteed for more than 1.6 million children from poor families, domestic employees were integrated into the social security system, poverty was reduced by almost 10% during two years of government, and direct state help was provided for 200,000 families in extreme poverty, with free electricity supplied to those Hondurans most in need.

=== Alliance with ALBA ===
On 22 July 2008, Zelaya sought to incorporate Honduras into ALBA, an international cooperation organization based on the idea of social, political, and economic integration in Latin America and the Caribbean.

=== Conflict with media ===
Zelaya said that the main media outlets in Honduras, owned by wealthy conservatives, were biased against him and did not cover what his government was doing: "No one publishes anything about me. . . . what prevails here is censorship of my government by the mass media." Inter Press Service says that the vast majority of radio and TV stations and print publications are owned by just six families.

According to a paper written by Manuel Orozco and Rebecca Rouse for the Inter-American Dialogue think tank in the United States, the Honduran media operate as arms of political parties.

On 24 May 2007, Zelaya ordered ten two-hour cadenas (mandatory government broadcasts) on all television and radio stations, "to counteract the misinformation of the news media". The move, while legal, was fiercely criticized by the country's main journalists' union, and Zelaya was dubbed "authoritarian" by his opposition. Ultimately, the broadcasts were scaled back to a one-hour program on the government's plans to expand telephone service, a half-hour on new electrical power plants and a half-hour about government revenues.

An unknown gunman in 2007 murdered the journalist Carlos Salgado, who often criticized Zelaya. The Inter-American Press Association (IAPA) and the United Nations criticized threats against journalists in Honduras. Other critical journalists, such as Dagoberto Rodriguez and Hector Geovanny Garcia, fled into exile because of constant murder threats.

The Associated Press, citing Manuel Orozco of the Inter American Dialogue, said that "His [Zelaya's] campaign for changing the constitution has energized his support base of labour groups, farmers and civil organisations who have long felt marginalized in a country where a wealthy elite controls the media and much of politics."

=== Corruption investigations of Hondutel ===
Manuel Zelaya appointed his nephew Marcelo Chimirri as General Manager of the state-owned telecom Hondutel.

According to the Mexican newspaper El Universal, relying on information supplied by the Arcadia Foundation, Hondutel's revenue decreased 47% between 2005 and 2006, the first year of President Manuel Zelaya's administration, despite Hondutel's monopoly on international calls In April 2009, Latin Node Inc., an American company, pleaded guilty to making improper payments to Hondutel, "knowing that some, or all of those funds, would be passed on as bribes to officials of Hondutel". Chimirri resigned in 2007, and was arrested following the coup. He remains in prison on charges of abuse of authority and embezzlement, charges he denies. Apart from Chimirri, Oscar Danilo Santos (the former manager of Hondutel), Jorge Rosa, and James Lagos are all charged in connection with allegedly committing crimes of abuse of authority, fraud and bribery having received bribes of $1.09 million U.S. from an international carrier in exchange for Hondutel providing that carrier lower rates than other firms. Auditor Julio Daniel Flores was charged for the lesser crime of violation of duties of officers.

=== Attempts to modify the constitution ===
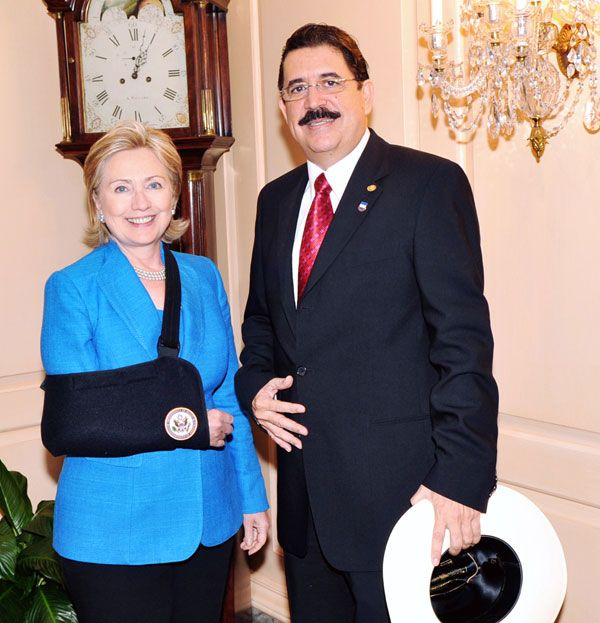
Zelaya with United States Secretary of State Hillary Clinton in 2009

Zelaya came to international attention in June 2009 when he was overthrown in a military coup and forced into exile. The crisis that led to his removal from office centered around the question of whether changes would be made to the 1982 Honduran Constitution. Zelaya proposed a national poll to gauge interest in constitutional change, which provoked a fierce reaction from opposition parties. Those responsible for the coup justified their actions on the grounds that Zelaya's interest in potentially convening a constituent assembly to draft a new constitution was illegal, and alleged that his real motive was to increase his time in office. Zelaya denied that his motive was to stay in office, stating that he intended to step down in January 2010 as scheduled, noting that his successor would be elected at the same time the vote on whether to convene a constituent assembly would occur.

Under constitutional law, the President of Honduras can amend the constitution without a referendum if a congressional majority exists. However, eight articles cannot be amended, including those related to term limits, the permitted system of government, and the process of presidential succession.

Because the president can amend 368 of the 375 articles in the Honduran constitution without calling a constituent assembly, some suspected that Zelaya's true intention was to extend his rule. One-time Christian Democrat presidential candidate Juan Ramón Martínez argued that Zelaya was attempting to discredit parliamentary democracy, saying, "There appears to be a set of tactics aimed at discrediting institutions... he has repeated on several occasions that democratic institutions are worthless and that democracy has not helped at all".

==== Referendum ====
On 11 November 2008, following requests from multiple Honduran groups for the convening of a constituent assembly,

Zelaya issued a decree organizing a poll to decide whether the electorate wanted a fourth ballot box installed at polling places for the upcoming 29 November 2009 general election – an addition to the usual three for presidential, congressional, and municipal candidates. The fourth ballot would ask voters whether to convene a National Constituent Assembly for the purpose of writing a new constitution. In March 2009, Zelaya announced that he first wanted to have a preliminary poll – he suggested 28 June 2009 as a date – to ask voters whether they wanted the fourth ballot to be included in the November 2009 election.

There has been considerable debate as to whether Zelaya's call for a poll about whether to organize a constituent assembly was legally valid according to the 1982 Constitution. Article 373 of the Constitution states that the Constitution can be amended by a two-thirds majority of the normal National Congress. Only eight articles cannot be amended in this fashion; they are specified in Article 374 of the Constitution and include term limits, system of government that is permitted, and process of presidential succession.

As Congress can amend 368 of 375 articles without any constituent assembly, some observers charged that Zelaya's true intention of holding a referendum on convening a constitutional convention on the same date as his successor's election was to extend his term of rule. In a newspaper interview shortly before his removal from office, Zelaya stated that he had every intention of stepping down when his term ends in January 2010.

==== Violation of Supreme Court rulings ====
The Supreme Court, without deciding on the constitutionality of the poll, ruled that a lower court ruling blocking the referendum was lawful.

The Supreme Court's ruling was supported by Congress, the country's attorney general, top electoral body, and the country's human rights ombudsman, who all said that Zelaya violated the law. Despite the opposition of the other branches of the government, Zelaya moved forward with his plan to hold the poll on 28 June 2009. In Honduras the military assists with election logistics; in late May 2009, Zelaya requested military help to distribute ballot boxes and other materials for the poll. The chief of the military, General Romeo Vásquez Velásquez, refused to carry this order out. In response, Zelaya dismissed Vásquez on 24 May. Subsequently, defense minister Edmundo Orellana and several other military commanders resigned in support of Vásquez. Both the Honduran Supreme Court and the Honduran Congress deemed the dismissal of Vásquez unlawful.

By 25 June, the newspaper La Tribuna reported that the military had deployed hundreds of troops around Tegucigalpa, to prevent possible disturbances by organisations that support Zelaya and with the exception of leftist organizations, "all sectors are publicly opposed to the consultation, which has been declared illegal by the Prosecutor and the Supreme Court". The troops were deployed from the First Infantry Battalion, located 5 km east of the city, to the vicinity of the presidential residence in the west, and the airport, in the south. There is some doubt, however, that Zelaya ever actually fired Vásquez. CNN news on 27 June reported that Zelaya on 24 June had said that he would fire Vásquez; but that on 26 June Zelaya said that he had never carried out his threat and the general had not been fired. "I didn't do it", he told CNN.

The Congress, the attorney general, and the top electoral tribunal declared Zelaya's proposed referendum illegal. Congress began to discuss impeaching Zelaya. On 27 June and again on 30 June 2009, thousands of protesters opposed to Zelaya's impeachment marched through the capital city.

== Constitutional crisis and Post-presidency (2009–2022) ==
=== Coup ===
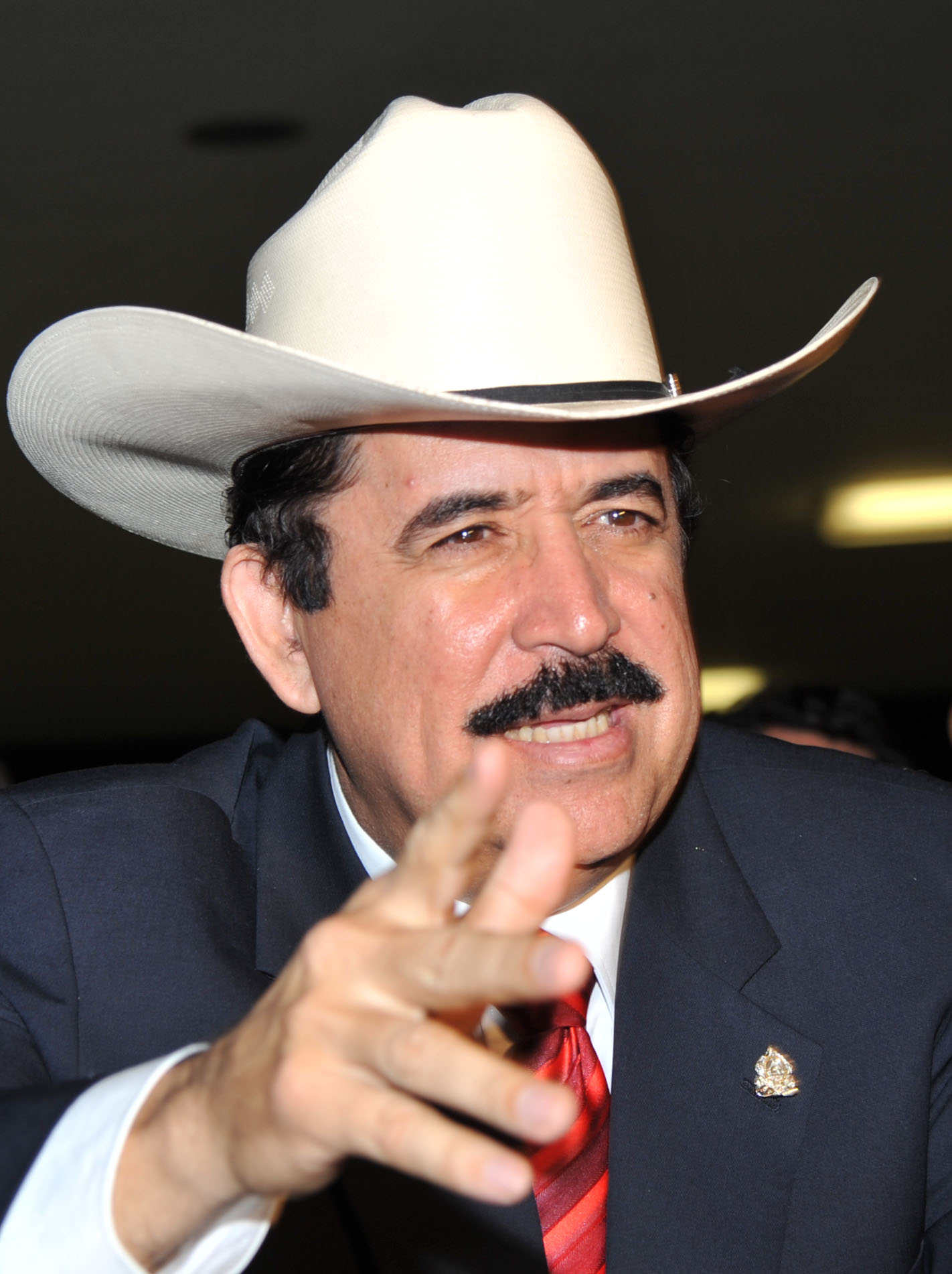
Zelaya in Brazil in August 2009

On 28 June 2009, the Supreme Court issued an order to detain President Zelaya, who was subsequently captured by the military. He was then brought to the air force base Hernan Acosta Mejia, and taken into exile in Costa Rica, precipitating the 2009 Honduran constitutional crisis.

The reason given for the arrest order were charges brought by the Attorney General. The rationale of the order was to enable a statement before the Supreme Court. The decision to expatriate Zelaya was however taken by the military themselves, knowing full well that expatriation violated the constitution. The military offered as justification that they exiled Zelaya "to avoid mob violence". Following the coup, Zelaya spoke to the media from his forced exile in San José. He identified the events as a coup and a kidnapping. Soldiers pulled him from his bed, he said, and assaulted his guards. Zelaya announced that he would not recognize anyone named as his successor, and that he wanted to finish his term in office. He also stated that he would begin to meet with diplomats, and attended the Summit of Central American presidents held in Managua, Nicaragua, two days later (30 June 2009).

The National Congress voted unanimously to accept what they said was Zelaya's letter of resignation. Zelaya said he did not write the letter.

National Congress President Roberto Micheletti, the next person in the presidential line of succession and a centre-Right, assumed the presidency following Zelaya's removal from office. The event was greeted with applause in the National Congress.

International bodies like the United Nations, the Organization of American States, and the European Union publicly condemned the events. U.S. President Barack Obama said, "We believe that the coup was not legal and that President Zelaya remains the President of Honduras." Hugo Chávez threatened to invade Honduras if the Venezuelan embassy or ambassador were attacked. Venezuela has said it would suspend oil shipments, and Honduras's neighbors—El Salvador, Guatemala and Nicaragua—suspended overland trade, and lifted the ban after two days. A one-page United Nations resolution, passed by acclamation in the then 192-member body, condemned the events and demanded Zelaya's "immediate and unconditional restoration" as president. The resolution calls "firmly and categorically on all states to recognise no government other than that" of Mr. Zelaya.

During the first five days out of country, Zelaya spent 80,000 dollars of Honduran public money on goods including hotels, food and clothing, continuing to spend on his expenses as the president of the country.

Zelaya's wife, Xiomara Castro de Zelaya, charged that the exiling of her husband was a violation of the Honduran Constitution. Article 102 of the Honduran Constitution forbids expatriating or handing over of Hondurans to foreign countries.

Following the coup trends of decreasing poverty and extreme poverty were reversed. The nation saw a poverty increase of 13.2 percent and in extreme poverty of 26.3 percent in just 3 years. Furthermore, unemployment grew between 2008 and 2012 from 6.8 percent to 14.1 percent.

=== Return to Honduras ===
On 21 September 2009, Zelaya and his wife arrived at the Brazilian embassy in Tegucigalpa. Zelaya said that to reach the embassy he travelled through mountains for fifteen hours, and took back roads to avoid checkpoints. Zelaya did not state from which country he entered Honduras. Hundreds of Zelaya's supporters surrounded the Brazilian embassy. Zelaya chanted "Restitution, Fatherland or Death!" to his supporters, raising fears that Zelaya was attempting a violent confrontation.

Michelletti initially denied that Zelaya had returned, but later admitted he had. Michelletti added that the return "changes nothing of our reality". Michelletti later issued a state of emergency with a curfew and asked the Brazilian government to put Zelaya in Honduran custody for trial. Brazilian foreign minister Celso Amorim stated that Brazil did not aid Zelaya's return. Security Vice-Minister Mario Perdomo ordered checkpoints on the highways leading to Tegucigalpa, to "stop those people coming to start trouble". Defense Minister Lionel Sevilla suspended all air flights to Tegucigalpa.

Costa Rican President Óscar Arias and U.S. Secretary of State Hillary Clinton urged both sides to begin a dialogue toward a peaceful solution and Eulogio Chavez, leader of a 60,000-member teachers union, announced that his organization would go on strike to back Zelaya. Shortly thereafter, Zelaya claimed that Israeli mercenaries had installed a mobile phone jammer.

On 27 September 2009, Honduras gave Brazil a ten-day deadline. Brazilian President Luiz Inácio Lula da Silva replied that he would ignore the deadline, saying that "Brazil will not comply with an ultimatum from a government of coup-mongers". Honduran interim president Roberto Micheletti warned that his government would take action if Brazil did not determine Zelaya's status soon. Lula requested an apology. Hundreds of Honduran soldiers and Police Officers surrounded the Brazilian embassy, where protests against the coup continued. On 29 October 2009, the government of "de facto" president Roberto Micheletti signed what United States Secretary of State Hillary Clinton called a "historic agreement" to let Manuel Zelaya serve the remaining three months of his term. "If Congress agrees", according to Elisabeth Malkin of The New York Times, "control of the army would shift to the electoral court, and the presidential election set for 29 Nov. would be recognized by both sides. Neither Mr. Zelaya nor Mr. Micheletti will be candidates".

When Micheletti announced he had, unilaterally, formed the unity government without input from Zelaya, Zelaya declared the agreement "dead" early on 6 November. The United States sent diplomats to help to resurrect the pact, but Zelaya insisted that he would not accept any deal to restore him to office if it meant he must recognize the elections of 29 November.

=== Presidential election of 29 November 2009 ===
On 29 November 2009, a presidential election was held under a state of emergency declared in Decree PCM-M-030-2009. According to the decree, the Secretary of State of the 'de facto' government was expected to participate in the military command for this state of emergency. Five of the six presidential candidates retained their candidacies, while Carlos H. Reyes had withdrawn his candidacy on 9 November in protest at what he perceived as illegitimacy of the election. Zelaya called for a boycott of the poll. Some Hondurans interviewed by Associated Press said that they "sought to move past the crisis with the elections", which had been scheduled previous to Zelaya's removal. Early returns indicated that conservative Porfirio Lobo was elected with around 55% of the votes. Official numbers for the turnout of the election falsely placed it at around 60%, but subsequently revised the numbers to 49% turnout.

Organisations and individuals in Honduras, including the National Resistance Front against the coup d'état in Honduras, Marvin Ponce of the Democratic Unification Party, and Bertha Oliva of COFADEH, and internationally, including Mercosur, President Cristina Kirchner of Argentina and the Union of South American Nations, said that elections held on 29 November under Micheletti would not be legitimate.

On 2 December, the National Congress began debate regarding the possible reinstatement of Zelaya to the presidency.

On 4 December, Juan Barahona-led activists ended five months of daily protests demanding the reinstatement of Zelaya, saying they were moving on now that Congress has voted to keep Manuel Zelaya out of office. Juan Barahona, who had been leading protests since late June when Zelaya was forced out of the country, said that his supporters are "closing that chapter" of their struggle. Barahona said it was time for Hondurans who support policies in favor of the poor and other themes that Zelaya espoused to shift their focus to the 2014 elections.

=== Exile ===
On 20 January 2010, the Dominican Republic and Honduran President-elect Lobo agreed to a deal that would allow Zelaya to be transported safely from the Brazilian embassy in Tegucigalpa where he had been, to the Dominican Republic upon Lobo taking office on 27 January. Lobo stated that he would ensure Zelaya would leave safely and "with dignity." Lobo negotiated with Dominican President Leonel Fernández. Lobo also discussed the situation with former presidential candidates, who signed onto a joint statement on the agreement, which also requested that sanctions against Honduras as a result of the coup be lifted. The next day, Zelaya agreed to the deal. A close advisor said Zelaya would remain politically active and hoped to later return to political activity.

Zelaya left Honduras on 27 January 2010 for the Dominican Republic, along with his wife, two children, and President Fernández of the Dominican Republic. Zelaya and his family lived in the Dominican Republic until his return in 2011. Several countries in the region continued to consider Zelaya the legitimate Honduran head of state.

=== Return from exile ===
Honduran President Porfirio Lobo met with Zelaya in Cartagena, Colombia on 22 May 2011. They both signed an agreement that allowed Zelaya to return to Honduras from exile. Six days later, on 28 May, Zelaya flew back to Honduras aboard a Conviasa jet and was greeted by thousands of his supporters at the airport. He gave a conciliatory speech that called for political reconciliation and increased democracy in the country.

=== Role of the United States ===
In 2015 and 2016, emails by U.S. Secretary of State Hillary Clinton were released subsequent to disputes over the Secretary's use of private email accounts for government communications. Some critics have argued that, despite Obama's public support for Zelaya and condemnation of the coup, these communications suggest that the Secretary of State Clinton seemed more interested in ensuring that previously scheduled elections for the new president proceeded in November, rather than taking a strong stand insisting that Zelaya be restored in the meantime. Zelaya himself has criticized both Clinton and the Obama administration, saying, "On the one hand, they condemned the coup, but on the other hand, they were negotiating with the leaders of the coup."

== First Gentleman of Honduras (2022–2026) ==
Upon his wife's inauguration as president, Zelaya became the first First Gentleman in Honduran history.

== Notes ==
Political offices
Preceded by Ricardo Maduro	President of Honduras; 2006–2009	Succeeded by Roberto Micheletti; Acting
Party political offices
Preceded by Rafael Pineda Ponce	Liberal nominee for President of Honduras; 2005	Succeeded by Elvin Santos
New political party	Leader of Libre; 2011–present	Incumbent
Honorary titles
Preceded by Ana García Carías as First Lady	First Gentleman of Honduras; 2022–2026	Succeeded by Lissette del Cid as First Lady
