= CLS Strategies =

US-based lobbying and public relations firm

- Formerly: Chlopak, Leonard, Schechter, and Associates
- Industry: Lobbying Firm
- Founded: 1993
- Founders: Robert Chlopak; Charlie Leonard; Peter Schechter
- Headquarters: Washington, D.C., United States
- Services: Public Affairs, Crisis and Legal Affairs, Digital Advocacy
- Website: https://www.clsstrategies.com/

CLS Strategies, formerly known as Chlopak, Leonard, Schechter and Associates, is a lobbying and public relations firm based in Washington, DC. Established in 1993 by Robert Chlopak, Charlie Leonard, and Peter Schechter, the firm has a diverse client portfolio, representing entities ranging from Fortune 500 companies like Oracle Corp. and Verizon Communications, to various foreign governments such as Brazil, Colombia, and Nicaragua. The firm re-branded as CLS Strategies in 2014.

CLS Strategies has faced scrutiny for its involvement in advising electoral candidates in Latin America and providing strategic counsel to governments during political upheavals. In October 2009, a protest was held outside of their Washington DC, office due to their representation of what was then referred to as the de-facto government of Honduras after the coup d'etat. In addition, in 2020, the firm was linked to a network of accounts on Facebook and Instagram that were taken down due to Coordinated Inauthentic Behavior, a violation of the platforms terms regarding foreign interference, and was attributed to their work on behalf of the Bolivian Government.

== History ==
Chlopak, Leonard, Schechter, and Associates was founded in 1993 by Robert Chlopak, Charles Leonard, and Peter Schechter. Robert Chlopak had previously been the executive director of the Democratic Senatorial Campaign Committee. Charles Leonard was a former national campaign director of the National Republican Congressional Committee. Peter Schechter previously served as the staff director of the House Banking Committee’s International Finance Subcommittee. Chlopak and Schechter had also both previously worked for Sawyer Miller Group. Sawyer Miller Group was another public relations firm that worked for foreign government officials, notably Barco Vargas of Colombia. Sawyer Miller Group was credited with helping him get elected.

The firm was purchased by Gavin Anderson & Co, a New York-based investor relations and corporate PR firm and subsidiary of Omnicom Group Inc., in October 2000. CLS was able to keep their name, operating as a Gavin Anderson Company. Chlopak became EVP of Gavin Anderson, and Leonard and Schechter became senior executives in the combined firm. The company changed its name to CLS Strategies in 2014 when it re-branded.

== Notable Clients ==
CLS Strategies has represented a variety of clients ranging from Fortune 500 companies, to foreign governments. Some companies they’ve represented are Oracle Corp., Verizon Communications, and General Electric Co., as well as non-profits such as The Campaign for Tobacco-Free Kids. Governments they’ve represented include, but are not limited to, Brazil, Columbia, Nicaragua, Georgia, and Serbia. Peter Schechter spent much of his time advising electoral candidates in Latin America, including Henrique Capriles of Venezuela, Alvaro Uribe of Columbia, and Fernando Henrique Cardoso of Brazil.

=== Honduras ===
In June 2009, President Manuel Zelaya was ousted in a coup. After which, what was then referred to as the interim government of Honduras, hired then Chlopak, Leonard, Schechter, and Associates to improve opinions of policy makers worldwide, primarily in the United States Congress.

The Organization of American States voted unanimously to suspend Honduras from the group due to its failure to recognize Zelaya as still the elected president and expressed deep concern about the decline of the political situation. They did not vote to impose sanctions. The de facto government resisted demands from the United States and other organizations to return Zelaya to power. Then President Obama imposed his own sanctions and denounced the coup regardless of Zelaya’s allyship with then Venezuelan leader Hugo Chavez. After the firm's lobbyists met multiple times with members of Congress and their staff, Senator Jim DeMint spoke to Fox News citing his concern that the new government was our new greatest ally in the region and spoke out against the sanctions.

For their involvement, CLS received negative publicity and indignation both in Honduras and in the US. A protest was held in front of their Washington DC office.

=== Bolivia ===
In December 2019, CLS Strategies was hired by the interim government of Bolivia for a three-month, $90,000 contract to advise the government on human rights and strengthening their democracy. This was after Evo Morales had fled the country and was charged with treason by then-interim president Jeanine Anez, who took office in November. CLS Partner Juan Cortinas and William Moore handled the effort.

During the month prior to CLS accepting the contract, the de facto government of Anez reportedly opened fire on protesters resulting in at least 18 deaths. A report by Amnesty International recommended a commitment to install the Interdisciplinary Group of Independent Experts (GIEI Bolivia) under the support of the Inter-American Commission on Human Rights. Because the GIEI is independent, it was seen as essential to fully understand the human rights violations committed between September 1 and December 31 of that year.

=== Mexico ===
Mexico’s then President-Elect, Enrique Pena Nieto hired CLS in 2012 for what was filed as US outreach and “monitoring of news and policy developments related to Mexico-US interests.” Six lobbyists from the firm filed paperwork confirming they worked on the account. There were questions about whether this was the first US media push on behalf of Pena that year. The Institutional Revolutionary Party (PRI) had a lawsuit filed against them earlier that year alleging $56 million was spent on advertising on Pena’s behalf to be broadcast in the United States before registering with the Department of Justice’s Foreign Agent Registrant Act. It is required of all foreign political parties that produce propaganda in the United States to register but it appeared that the PRI did not.

=== Al Jazeera Media Network ===
In 2019, CLS Strategies provided Washington support for Al Jazeera Media Network, the Arab-language satellite TV network headquartered in Qatar. As part of Omnicom, CLS operated as a subcontractor to the law firm DLA Piper. Al Jazeera’s decision to hire lobbyists came after members of the US Congress wanted the media company to register under the Foreign Agents Registration act, which at that time they had not done. What issues the lobbyists were actually addressing was never made clear to the media.

=== Complete Genomics ===
In March 2024, CLS Strategies signed on to work for Complete Genomics, which was dropped by its other lobbying firms the previous month. The company had been facing scrutiny from Washington for its ties to China. They were previously represented by the Vogel Group until members of Congress were considering closing their doors to meetings on the matter. Bob Chlopak, Brian Berry, and Natalie Pavaltos of CLS Strategies were hired to lobby on issues concerning gene sequencing equipment. They were also hired to help clarify what was called inaccurate information about the company’s ownership. The bill was named with several other biotech companies as targets in bills that would ban the federal government from entering into contracts or obtaining equipment from them. Complete Genomics’s parent company MGI and its former parent company BGI Group were also named. CLS Strategies argued that Complete Genomics was US-based regardless of where its parent company was located, and provided essential genetic sequencing equipment that is used in cancer and Alzheimer’s research as well as the search for sustainable food supplies.

=== DJI Technologies ===
CLS Strategies stood by DJI Technologies in early 2024, a drone maker based in China after it too was dropped as a client by Vogel Group and another firm Avoq, previously known as Subject Matter. DJI is a privately held global manufacturer of drones that had been placed on several US restrictions barring the company from buying US technology. It has also been prohibited from American investments citing concerns about spying and tracking Chinese Uyghur Muslims. Some states, such as Florida, have also banned the use of DJI drones and others made in China from being used by state government agencies. CLS Strategies has lobbied to remove DJI from the Department of Defense’s list of Chinese Military Companies on the grounds that it doesn’t fit on the list.

== Facebook and CIB accusations ==
On August 31, 2020, Facebook removed 55 accounts, 42 pages and 36 Instagram accounts credited to CLS Strategies for taking part in a campaign of misinformation which they referred to as Coordinated Inauthentic Behavior, or CIB.

In their report, Facebook refers to CIB as actions by domestic, non-government groups of accounts and pages aiming to spread false information by claiming to be people they aren’t. In August they claimed to remove three networks of accounts: Two from Russia and the US, which targeted people outside of their own country, and one from Pakistan that targeted people in both Pakistan and India.

Facebook stated the actions taken by CLS Strategies violated its policy against foreign interference, or CIB on behalf of a foreign entity. 11 pages were related to Bolivia and supported the Interim President Jeanine Áñez and spread disparaging information about the former president, Evo Morales. Their creation dates and manager location settings were all similar. Venezuela pages started out supporting the Venezuelan opposition leaders but changed tone in 2020, focusing on factional divides rather than opposition president Juan Guaido. Six profiles matching names and photos of real CLS Strategies employees were also removed. CLS Strategies admitted to having a contract with the Bolivian government during Bolivia’s 2020 elections stating intentions to also strengthen democracy and human rights in the region. CLS stated at the time that they had “a long tradition of doing international work, including on social media, to promote free and open elections and to oppose oppressive regimes…” and that they “take very seriously the issues raised by Facebook and others.” They also claimed to have hired an outside law firm for an internal investigation, and have placed the head of their Latin American practice on leave. Bob Chlopak made a statement claiming that the work they conducted in Latin America was done at the behest of clients located within the countries themselves, not on behalf of foreign governments, meaning the work they did was 'very different' than what was reported by Facebook.

== See also ==
- Peter Schechter
- Astroturfing
- 2009 Honduran coup d’etat
- 2019 Bolivian political crisis
