= Immigrant Food =

Restaurant in Washington, D.C., United States

Coordinates: 38.8995°N 77.0398°W

- Interactive map of Immigrant Food

Restaurant information
- Established: November 12, 2019
- Owners: Enrique Limardo; Peter Schechter; Ezequiel Vázquez-Ger
- Head chef: Enrique Limardo
- Food type: Fusion cuisine
- Location: 1701 Pennsylvania Avenue NW, Washington, D.C., 20006, United States
- Website: immigrantfood.com

Immigrant Food is a fast-casual restaurant located at 1701 Pennsylvania Avenue NW in Washington, D.C. It was founded by chef Enrique Limardo, Téa Ivanovic, Peter Schechter, and Ezequiel Vázquez-Ger, and opened on November 12, 2019. Located near the White House, the restaurant combines its food offerings with pro-immigrant activism.

Immigrant Food serves fusion cuisine from China, El Salvador, Ethiopia, and other countries. Its menu is prepared by Limardo.

The restaurant engages in what they refer to as "gastroadvocacy", accepting donations and signing up volunteers, as well as working as a hub for non-profits to host events helping immigrants find jobs and learn English.

== History ==
Immigrant Food opened its doors on November 12, 2019, one block away from the White House. Its founders, Enrique Limardo, Téa Ivanovic, Peter Schechter, and Ezequiel Vázquez-Ger, are immigrants themselves, having come to the US from Venezuela, Belgium, Italy, and Argentina, respectively.

Peter Schechter's background was in political consulting and advocacy, as well as serving on the board of another restaurant company, ThinkFoodGroup. He's also been given credit for coming up with the premise behind the restaurant as a way to fight against the growing anti-immigrant sentiment in the US. Limbardo and Vazquez-Ger owned another restaurant together called Seven Reasons that had received recognition from Esquire. Ivanovic's background was in journalism and public relations.

Immigrant Food's opening day coincided with the Supreme Court's first day of arguments over Deferred Action for Childhood Arrivals, or DACA, surrounding then President Trump's proposed removal of the program. That same day the restaurant posted a picture on Instagram of one of their tote bags on the courthouse steps and posted information about DACA on their website. Schechter insists the restaurant isn't purely political. He stated, "Food has been a quintessential way that immigrants have shown their culture to Americans for so many centuries, to show what makes up home," and that he thought a restaurant was the way to highlight immigrant contributions.

Immigrant Food opened two more Washington, D.C. locations in 2021: a food stall at Union Market on May 12, and an "offshoot" location, Immigrant Food+, in the Planet Word museum on October 7. On July 23, 2024, the restaurant opened a location in the Ballston neighborhood of Arlington County, Virginia.

== Advocacy ==
Immigrant Food partners with five non-governmental organizations: Asian Pacific American Legal Resource Center, Ayuda, Capital Area Immigrants' Rights Coalition, CASA, and CARECEN, all of which use the restaurant's upstairs space for meetings and events, including English, job search, and citizenship classes. Immigrant Food's work has been called "gastroadvocacy," and its educational materials are critical of the Trump administration's immigration policies. Customers are given what's referred to as an "engagement menu" that provides a list of ways to get involved with supporting immigrant communities. One themed event hosted in 2022 was a brunch for the celebration of vaccines, and immigrants' contributions to vaccine development. One prop used at the brunch was a syringe-style ketchup dispenser given with fries. A percentage of the proceeds from the event was donated to Mary's Center a local non-profit that provides healthcare services to under-served communities in the D.C. area and Maryland.
