= Téa Ivanovic =

- Born: Belgium
- Education: Virginia Tech, Johns Hopkins University
- Occupations: Chief Operations Officer and co-founder
- Organization: Immigrant Food
- Website: https://immigrantfood.com/

Téa Ivanovic is the co-founder and Chief Operating Officer (COO) of Immigrant Food, a "cause-casual" restaurant in Washington, D.C. She previously was a Washington Correspondent for Oslobođenje.

== Biography ==
Téa Ivanovic was born in Belgium to parents from the former Yugoslavia. Her upbringing centered around sports, as her father was a professional volleyball coach. She lived in several countries before moving to the U.S. including Sweden, Switzerland, Greece and Turkey.

When she was 16, she moved from Belgium to Blacksburg, Virginia, to play varsity tennis at Virginia Tech, where she would receive her Bachelors Degree of Arts and Science with a focus on international studies. She later obtained her Master’s Degree in international economics and European and Eurasian studies from The Johns Hopkins University Paul H. Nitze School of Advanced International Studies in 2016.

After obtaining her graduate degree, Ivanovic worked as a Washington Correspondent for Oslobođenje, a newspaper from Bosnia and Herzegovina. She was also a project manager for the Mediterranean Basin Initiative and a fellow at the Center for Transatlantic Relations (CTR-SAIS). Her work involved writing news articles, op-eds, book chapters, event planning, and digital marketing.

In November 2019, she co-founded Immigrant Food, a "cause-casual" restaurant in Washington, D.C. along with Peter Schechter, Enrique Limardo, and Ezequiel Vázquez-Ger. The restaurant focuses on advocating for immigrants through what they call “gastroadvocacy,” by celebrating immigrant contributions to the culinary industry and challenging negative perceptions. As the chief operating officer of Immigrant Food, Ivanovic oversees various aspects of the business, including finances, marketing, advocacy, and operations.

Téa Ivanovic's endeavors have been recognized by Forbes, which named her to its annual list of 30 entrepreneurs under 30 in the food and drink category for 2023.
