= Truth and Reconciliation Commission (Honduras) =

The Truth and Reconciliation Commission (TRC; Spanish: Comisión de la Verdad y la Reconciliación [CVR]) in Honduras began its work on May 4, 2010 and submitted a final report in July 2011. The commission was created due to its inclusion as one of the measures in the “Accord for National Reconciliation and the Strengthening of Democracy in Honduras".

This agreement was created in response to the 2009 Honduran coup d'état which took place on June 28, where military troops were involved in the removal of former president Manuel Zelaya from office, in response to the 2009 Honduran constitutional crisis.

The report itself collected a significant amount of information and testimonies from the public, and released a report detailing the abuses committed towards 20 of the victims. This report also criticized the role of several actors in the coup, such as de facto president Roberto Micheletti, and presented a list of recommendations for the Honduran government.

== Background ==
On the morning of June 28, 2009, military troops in Honduras stormed the house of president Manuel Zelaya, who had been in power since November 2005. These troops surrounded his residence, disarmed and beat his security guards, before arresting him and sending him on a plane to Costa Rica to live in exile.

What sparked this event had been a disagreement in response to president Zelaya’s proposed changes to the constitution. One of the most controversial was a proposed removal of the presidential term limit, which many critics saw as a self-serving move to extend his own rule. When congress voted against this measure and tried to intervene, Zelaya refused to cancel the referendum, leading to congress ordering the removal of Zelaya from office.

Following the ousting of president Zelaya, there was further political conflict. Several dozen high ranking government officials including the foreign minister were all taken captive, and ambassadors from other countries which supported the Zelaya government were detained and beaten, however later released. The new military government also committed a range of crimes in the period succeeding including the killing of opposition activists.

== Commission ==
=== Establishment ===
On October 30, 2009, the San Jose accords were agreed upon by representatives from each of Micheletti and Zelaya’s camps, in response to the military coup that had occurred, with the aim of ending the political turmoil and restoring a level of peace to the country. One of the key mandates was the creation of the CVR, or the Honduras Truth and Reconciliation Commission.

Whilst both parties would later go against the terms of the accord, essentially voiding it, the new president, Porfirio Lobo Sosa, was elected shortly after on 29 November 2009, and he supported the contents of the accord with the backing of international actors such as the United States. The work of the new commission began in May 2010.

=== Mandate and structure ===
The commission was set to run for at least 8 months, with a likely end date of early 2011, but was later delayed until July. The commission was funded by countries such as the United States and Spain. President Lobo selected five members for the commission, which included two Hondurans, and three foreigners.

The first member selected was Eduardo Stein, who was a former vice-president of Guatemala, and was in charge of both writing the charter of and assisting in the picking of foreign candidates for the commission. The two other foreign members selected were Michael Kergin, formerly a Canadian Ambassador in the United States, and María Zavala Valladares, who was formerly a President of the Supreme Court in Peru, and held other high ranking positions. The two Hondurans selected by Lobo were Omar Casco and Julieta Castellanos, both of whom have served as Rector of the Universidad Nacional Autónoma de Honduras.

The mandate of the commission was to “Clarify the events that occurred prior to and after June 28, 2009 in Honduras, with the goal of identifying the acts that led to the crisis situation and providing the people of Honduras with elements to prevent such incidents from recurring in the future".

=== Report and findings ===
The commission wrote the report using public information collected, reports by human rights organisations and the media, and testimonies from over 250 members of the public with knowledge of the violations committed. The final report, So That the Events Will Not Be Repeated, was presented by Eduardo Stein to President Lobo and other high ranking officials in July 2011.

The commission referenced Zelaya’s proposed changes and actions as key issues which caused the crisis, and that he had broken the law when he had ignored the urges of congress with regards to cancelling the referendum. The commission also said, however, that it was illegal for congress to have removed the president from office and appointed an interim president, Micheletti, in the meantime. It identified that what had occurred was a Coup d'état and identified that 20 people had been killed by the military government or actors following the coup, and detailed these violations. The commission also found that the police and army had obstructed investigations into some of the human rights violations, and attributed responsibility for the violations to several key actors including de facto President Micheletti.

The commission made a list with more than 80 total recommendations to the Honduran government, such as increasing political transparency, police reforms, and providing conditions which would ensure that human rights defenders could work free from harassment or obstruction.

This included seven key recommendations relating to human rights including the following:

- pursuing, prosecuting and punishing perpetrators of human rights abuses committed during the interim government;
- establishing a national plan of reparations for those having legitimate and verifiable human rights grievances;
- providing sufficient resources and independence to the Public Prosecutor’s Office, in order that it may respond promptly to human rights complaints;
- conducting an independent review of the actions of the human rights commissioner during the interim government;
- reviewing legislation to ensure that Honduran law is compatible with international norms and standards, particularly in relation to personal security related to freedom of expression – especially that of journalists – and freedom of association;
- guaranteeing that tribal and indigenous people have access to justice in their own language; and
- ensuring compliance with the International Labour Organization convention regarding the duty to consult about the use and exploitation of natural resources in aboriginal territories.

=== Criticism ===
There has been a mixed response to the commission. Much criticism has been levelled at the fact that there was no mandate to investigate human rights violations or abuses during or following the coup. There has also been criticism for the members selected, none of whom had a significant background in human rights, the fact that several of the members hail from countries which were supportive, and into the large role that the international community played in forming the truth commission.

The distrust towards President Lobo also manifested itself into a general distrust towards the commission.

== Aftermath ==
The report itself had limited impact on society in Honduras, due to factors such as the distrust for President Lobo, however, some groups welcomed the information presented and admittance of wrongdoing, and it was met by praise from Secretary General of the OAS, José Miguel Insulza, who thought it would likely result in positive change for Honduran society.

As of October 2013, Honduras has reported to have complied with 32 of the recommendations, be in the process with complying with 37 more, and are yet to implement the final 17. Honduras, however, also reported that they had failed to prosecute and investigate those responsible for the violations during the coup.

There have been reports that politically motivated attacks on opposition supporters have continued under President Lobo.

An alternative truth commission, the Comisión de Verdad (CDV) was set up by human rights groups due to many of the criticisms.
