= 2009 Honduran coup d'état =

Military overthrow of Honduran president

- Part of 2009 Honduran constitutional crisis
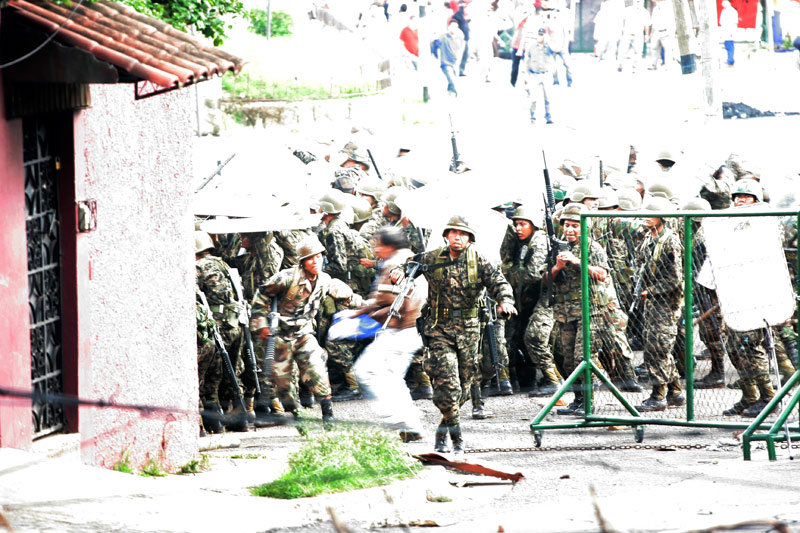
- Clash between pro-Zelaya protester and Honduran soldiers during the coup
- Date: 28 June 2009; 17 years ago
- Location: Honduras
- Caused by: President Manuel Zelaya's alleged repeated violations of the Honduran constitution: Promotion of the cuarta urna proposal; Protests against Zelaya government
- Result: President Manuel Zelaya deposed by the Honduran Army on orders from the Supreme Court of Honduras: Roberto Micheletti becomes de facto President and orders curfew; New presidential elections held in November 2009

Parties
Armed Forces of Honduras: Honduran Army; Supreme Court of Honduras; National Electoral Council; National Congress of Honduras: Liberal Party of Honduras (factions); National Party of Honduras; Christian Democratic Party; Anti-Zelaya protesters	Government of Honduras: President of the Republic of Honduras; Manuel Zelaya loyalists; Liberal Party of Honduras (Pro-Zelaya faction); Democratic Unification Party; Pro Zelaya protesters

Lead figures
Romeo Vásquez Velásquez Roberto Micheletti; Vilma Cecilia Morales	Manuel Zelaya (surrendered); Arístides Mejía; Patricia Rodas; Rodolfo Padilla Sunseri

The 2009 Honduran coup d'état occurred during the 2009 Honduran constitutional crisis. It was triggered after President Manuel Zelaya refused to comply with a Honduran Supreme Court ruling. On 28 June 2009, the Honduran Army ousted Zelaya and sent him into exile.

Zelaya had sought to schedule a non-binding poll on convening a constituent assembly to write a new constitution (the fourth ballot box referendum). After he defied court orders to cease, the Supreme Court issued a secret arrest warrant on 26 June. Two days later, soldiers stormed the presidential residence, detained Zelaya, and halted the poll. Rather than putting him on trial, the army flew him to Costa Rica. Later that day, after presenting a resignation letter of disputed authenticity, the Honduran Congress voted to remove Zelaya from office and appointed congressional head Roberto Micheletti, the constitutional successor, to complete his term. This was the first coup in Honduras since 1978.

The international reaction was widespread. The United Nations, the Organization of American States (OAS), and the European Union condemned Zelaya's removal as a military coup. On 5 July 2009, the OAS voted unanimously to suspend Honduras.

In July 2011, the Honduran Truth and Reconciliation Commission concluded that while Zelaya had broken the law by defying the Supreme Court, his removal was also illegal and constituted a coup. The commission found Congress's appointment of Micheletti unconstitutional, labeling his administration a "de facto regime." Chaired by former Guatemalan Vice President Eduardo Stein, the commission presented its report to then-President Porfirio Lobo Sosa, Supreme Court head Jorge Rivera Avilez, and OAS Secretary General José Miguel Insulza.

In November 2021, over a decade after the coup, Zelaya's wife, former First Lady Xiomara Castro de Zelaya, was elected as Honduras's first female president.

== Background ==
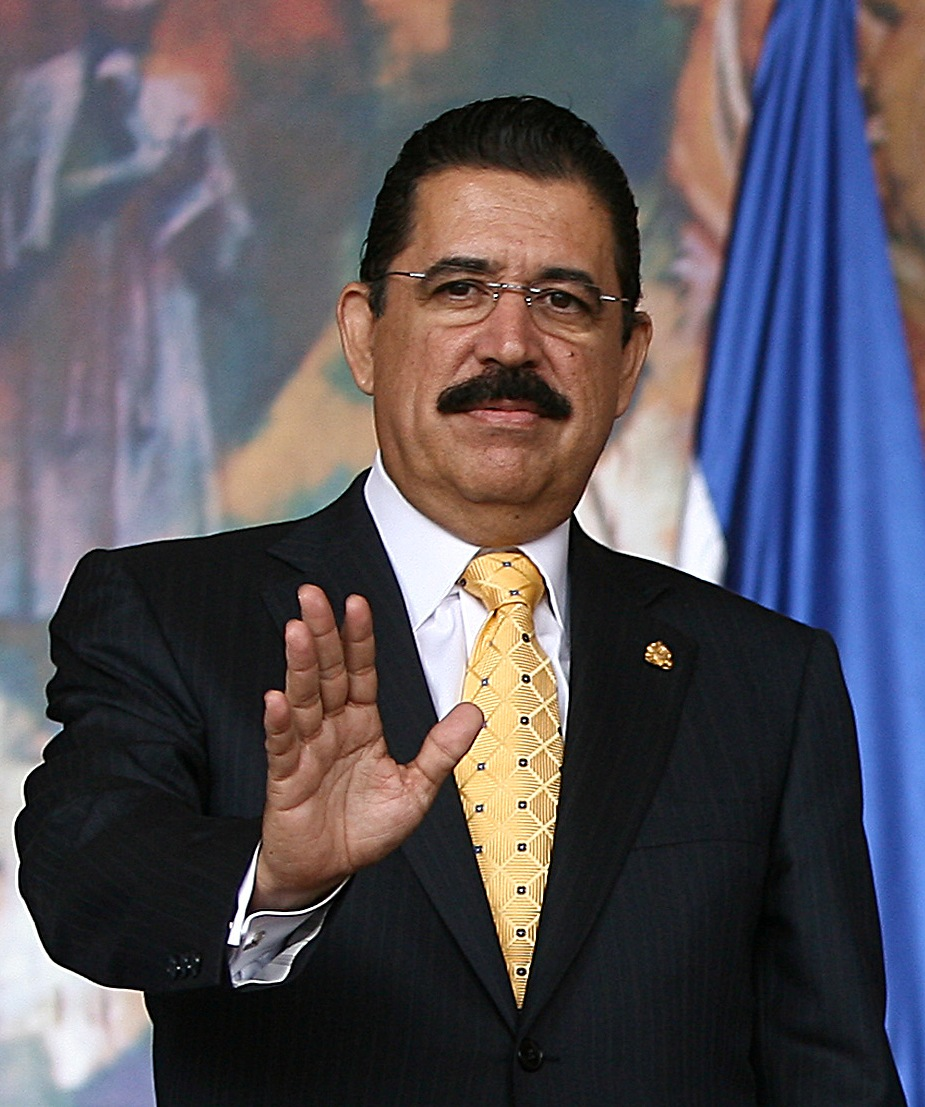
President Zelaya in 2007

President Zelaya was promoting a controversial nonbinding poll on whether to include a referendum in the form of a fourth ballot box in the November elections on convening a constitutional convention to write a new constitution to give future Presidents the option of more terms in office. He had ignored a restraining order in this regard. Some claim his goal in doing so was to extend his term. But as the scheduled balloting would have been simultaneous with the election of his successor, his term would have ended long before any possible constitutional changes.

=== Executive decrees and their legal consequences ===
The ballot was scheduled for June 28, 2009. On May 27, 2009, the Administrative Litigation Court annulled the Executive decree PCM-05-2009 that enabled the ballot. In response the Executive accepted the ruling, but issued decree PCM-019-2009, identical to the previous decree, but substituting "consultation" with "public opinion survey". On May 30, the same Court clarified that the scope of the previous ruling covered any decree that attempted to conduct the proposed ballot - howsoever worded or published. This clarification annulled PCM-019-2009 as well.

Zelaya then issued a new executive decree PCM-020-2009 (La Gaceta article number 31945) to replace decrees PCM-05-2009 and PCM-019-2009. The new decree called for a "Public Opinion Survey Convening a Constitutional Assembly" and referred to it as "an official activity of the Government of the Republic of Honduras".

According to a legal analysis by former Supreme Court President Vilma Morales, Zelaya automatically ceased being President of Honduras with the publication of decree PCM-020-2009 and thus no coup d'état existed. However, PCM-027-2009 was never processed by the Honduran courts. This new decree, published in La Gaceta on 26 June 2009, further explained the purpose, form, and objectives of the opinion poll to be carried out by the National Institute of Statistics. Despite this, the courts had already made up their minds about any attempts related to this issue. Zelaya's lawyers were also denied the possibility to participate in the process. PCM-027-2009 was sheltered in article 5 of the "Law of Citizen Participation" and articles 2 and 5 of the Honduran Constitution. Zelaya defined his actions as a non-binding opinion poll, but his political opponents portrayed his actions as a binding referendum aimed at reforming articles in the Honduran Constitution regarding forms of government and re-election.

=== Attorney General's office acts ===
On 27 May 2009, the Administrative Law Tribunal issued an injunction against holding the referendum at the request of the Honduran Attorney General Luis Alberto Rubi. On 16 June, the Court of Appeals unanimously upheld the 27 May injunction. On 18 June, the Administrative Law Tribunal ordered Zelaya to comply with the ruling. The Attorney General's office filed charges against Zelaya on 25 June.

=== Supreme Court issues arrest and search warrants ===
On 26 June, the Honduran Supreme Court unanimously found that the Presidency had not complied with 16 June court order. It also found he was answerable to charges for crimes against the form of government, treason to the motherland, abuse of office and usurpation of functions that damaged the administration. It appointed Supreme Court Justice Tomás Arita Valle to try the case.

On 26 June, the Supreme Court issued a sealed (secret) arrest warrant for President Zelaya, signed by Justice Tomás Arita Valle. The interim government confirmed that the Supreme Court of Justice unanimously voted to appoint Tomás Arita Valle to hear the process in its preparatory and intermediate phases; and that he lawfully issued an arrest and raid warrant. The government also states that an investigation was conducted under the auspices of the Honduran Supreme Court that lasted for weeks.

Some Zelaya supporters have sought to cast doubt on the Supreme Court's documentation. Jari Dixon Herrera Hernández, a lawyer with the Attorney General's office, said the order to arrest Zelaya came a day after the coup.

== Zelaya's detention and exile ==
Soldiers stormed the president's residence in Tegucigalpa early in the morning of 28 June, disarming the presidential guard, waking Zelaya and putting him on a plane to Costa Rica. Colonel Bayardo said, "It was a fast operation. It was over in minutes, and there were no injuries, no deaths. We said, 'Sir, we have a judicial order to detain you.' " In Costa Rica, Zelaya told the Latin American channel TeleSUR that he had been awakened by gunshots. Masked soldiers took his cell phone, shoved him into a van and took him to an air force base, where he was put on a plane. He said he did not know that he was being taken to Costa Rica until he landed at the airport in San José.

Within hours, Zelaya spoke to media in San José, calling the events "a coup" and "a kidnapping". He said that soldiers pulled him from his bed and assaulted his guards. Zelaya stated that he would not recognise anyone named as his successor, that he would be meeting with diplomats and that he wanted to finish his term in office.

Television and radio stations broadcast no news. The electrical power, phone lines, and international cable TV were cut or blocked throughout Honduras. Public transportation was suspended.

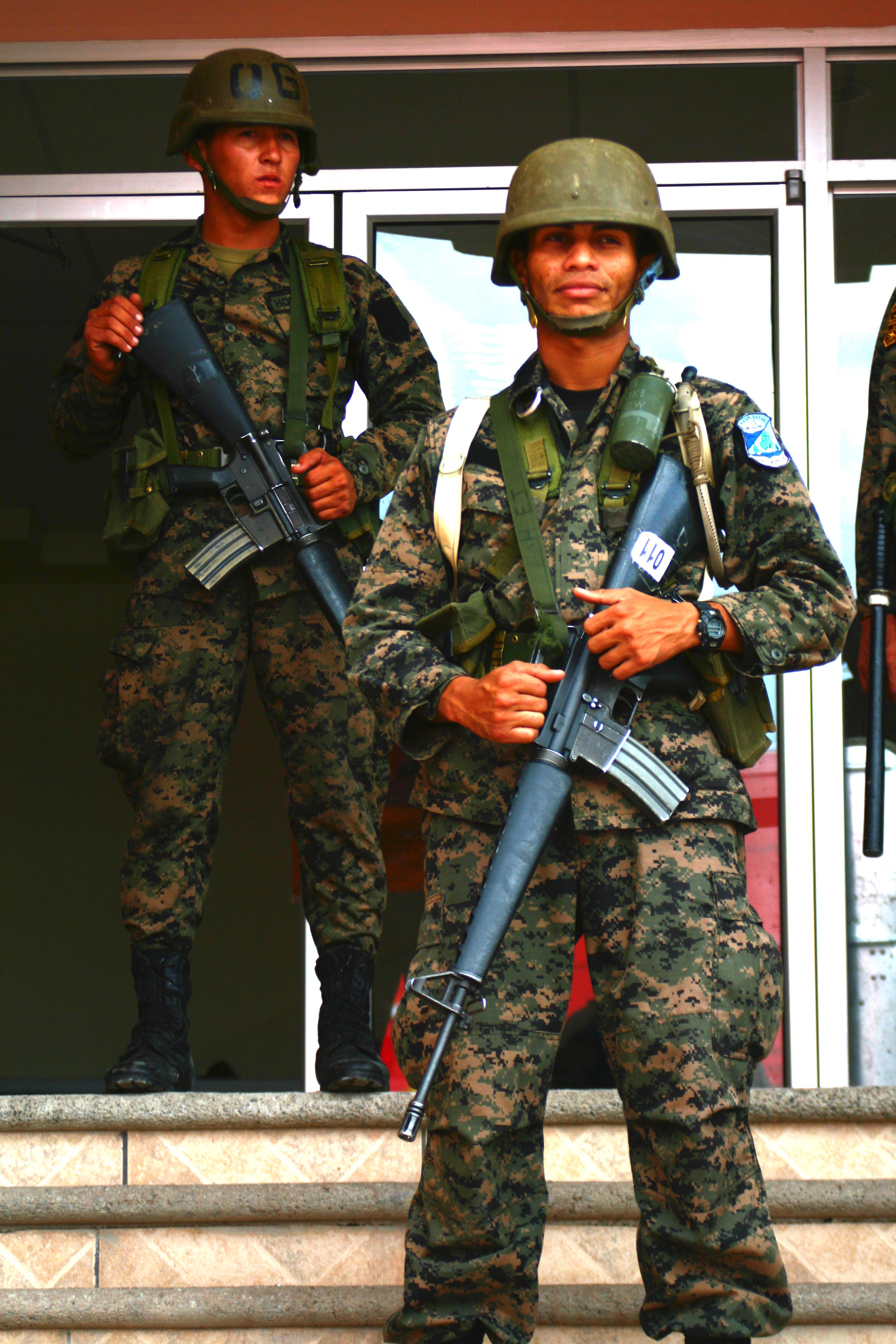
Honduran soldiers guard buildings.

Later that day, the Supreme Court issued a statement that it had ordered the army to remove Zelaya from office. The Supreme Court stated "The armed forces, in charge of supporting the constitution, acted to defend the state of law and have been forced to apply legal dispositions against those who have expressed themselves publicly and acted against the dispositions of the basic law". On 30 June, the military's chief lawyer, Colonel Herberth Bayardo Inestroza Membreño, showed a detention order, signed 26 June by a Supreme Court judge, which ordered the armed forces to detain the president, identified by his full name of José Manuel Zelaya Rosales, at his home in the Tres Caminos area of the capital. It cited him for treason and abuse of authority, among other charges. Colonel Inestroza later stated that deporting Zelaya did not comply with the court order: "In the moment that we took him out of the country, in the way that he was taken out, there is a crime. Because of the circumstances of the moment this crime occurred, there is going to be a justification and cause for acquittal that will protect us." He said the decision was taken by the military leadership "in order to avoid bloodshed". He said "What was more beneficial, remove this gentleman from Honduras or present him to prosecutors and have a mob assault and burn and destroy and for us to have to shoot?" Colonel Inestroza also commented that Zelaya's allegiance to Hugo Chávez was hard to stomach and "It would be difficult for us, with our training, to have a relationship with a leftist government. That's impossible. I personally would have retired, because my thinking, my principles, would not have allowed me to participate in that."

Ramón Custodio, head of the country's human rights commission, said that the military made an "error" in sending Zelaya into exile rather than holding him for trial. "I didn't know they would take Zelaya out of the country," Custodio said in an interview in the week of 13 August at his Tegucigalpa office. Honduras's Supreme Court agreed to hear a case brought by a group of lawyers and judges arguing that the military broke the law taking Zelaya out of the country. On 17 August 2009, President Micheletti also said that putting Zelaya on a plane to Costa Rica instead of holding him for trial had been a mistake: "It wasn't correct. We have to punish whoever allowed that to happen. The rest was framed within what the constitution requires."

== Congress removes Zelaya from office ==
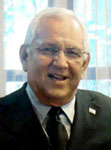
De facto president Roberto Micheletti

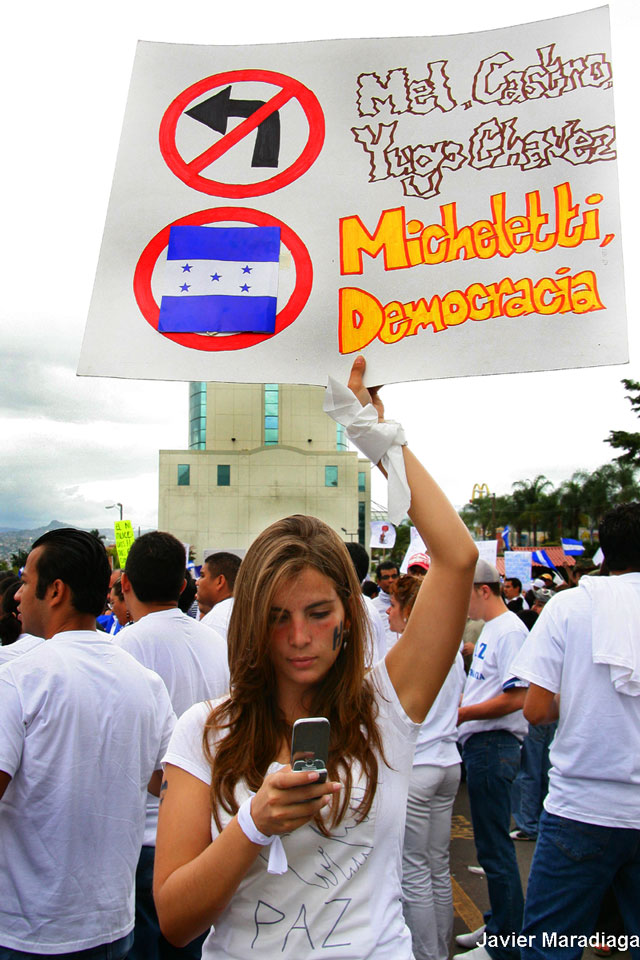
Demonstrators supporting Micheletti

The National Congress the following morning voted to accept Zelaya's resignation letter, dated 25 June, which Zelaya had denied signing. It studied a special report on Zelaya, and by a show of hands, the National Congress – the majority of whom belonged to Zelaya's own Liberal party – appointed the President of the National Congress Roberto Micheletti, a member of Zelaya's party, to succeed Zelaya. Some felt that the president had changed his politics during his administration, from right to left, which earned him the antipathy of his party.

The Honduran National Congress unanimously agreed to:

- Under the Articles 1, 2,3,4, 205, 220, subsections 20, 218, 242, 321, 322, 323 of the Constitution of the Republic,
  - Disapprove Zelaya's repeated violations of the constitution, laws and court orders.
  - Remove Zelaya from office.
- Name the current President of Congress Roberto Micheletti to complete the constitutional period that ends on 27 January 2010.

== Legality of ouster ==
Many governments, media, and human-rights organisations outside Honduras have termed the ouster a coup. The United Nations, the Organization of American States (OAS), and the European Union condemned the removal of Zelaya as a military coup. On 5 July 2009, the Organization of American States OAS, invoking for the first time Article 21 of the Inter-American Democratic Charter, voted by acclamation of all member states to suspend Honduras from the organisation.

Soon after the coup, U.S. President Barack Obama stated: "We believe that the coup was not legal and that President Zelaya remains the president of Honduras, the democratically elected president there." He stated: "It would be a terrible precedent if we start moving backwards into the era in which we are seeing military coups as a means of political transition, rather than democratic elections." Secretary of State Hillary Clinton, however, equivocated, saying that "We do think that this has evolved into a coup" and noting that under U.S. law, officially declaring a coup would oblige the U.S. to cut off most foreign aid to Honduras." Cutting off aid was seen as a possibility in the days after the coup, and State Department Director of Policy Planning Anne-Marie Slaughter urged Clinton to "take bold action" and to "find that [the] coup was a 'military coup' under U.S. law." Clinton did not do so, and the U.S. never formally declared that a coup had occurred. In September, Clinton was "pushing hard" for Zelaya to be restored to power. By November, the U.S. "focused on pushing for elections" in the country. In September 2009, the Board of the U.S. Millennium Challenge Corporation, headed by Clinton, cut off $11 million in aid to the Honduran government in the wake of the coup, and suspended another $4 million in planned contributions to a road project. From 2009 to mid-2016, however, the U.S. provided about $200 million in military and police aid to Honduras, a controversial decision given the violence in Honduras and the government's human rights violations.

Arguments that Zelaya's removal was illegal have been advanced by several lawyers. The Supreme Court never ruled on any of the charges filed by the public prosecutor on 26 June. The arrest warrant was issued for the purposes of taking a deposition from him. According to Edmundo Orellana, the events were constitutionally irregular for several reasons: because Zelaya was captured by the armed forces, not the national police (Art. 273, 292); and because the Congress, not the courts, judged Zelaya to have broken the law (Arts. 303 and 304). Orellana concluded, "Violations of the Constitution cannot be put right with another violation. The Constitution is defended by subjecting oneself to it. Their violation translates into disregard for the State of Law and infringes on the very essence of the Law. Therefore, a coup d'Etat never has been and should never be the solution to a political conflict." Other civic and business leaders, even those opposed to Zelaya's referendum efforts, agreed that Zelaya was deprived of due process in his ouster.

Still, many people in Honduras, including most of the country's official institutions, claimed that there was a constitutional succession of power. In a statement to a subcommittee of the US House Committee on International Affairs, former Honduran Supreme Court Justice, Foreign Affairs minister, and law professor Guillermo Pérez Cadalso said that all major governmental institutions agreed that Zelaya was violating the law. Supreme Court Justice Rosalinda Cruz said that, as a sovereign and independent nation, Honduras had the right to freely decide to remove a president who was violating Honduran laws. She added: "Unfortunately, our voice hasn't been heard." She compared Zelaya's tactics, including his dismissal of the armed forces chief for obeying a court order to impound ballots to be used in the vote, with those of Venezuelan President Hugo Chávez: "Some say it was not Zelaya but Chávez governing."

There is a small amount of middle ground between those who term the events a coup and those who call them a constitutionally-sound succession of power. On the one hand, several supporters of Zelaya's removal, including Acting Honduran President Roberto Micheletti and the top army lawyer, have admitted that sending Zelaya out of the country was illegal, although they argue it was justified by the need to prevent violence. Micheletti said forcing deposed President Manuel Zelaya to leave the country, instead of arresting him, was a mistake. On the other hand, a fraction of those who oppose the events consider the arrest warrant against Zelaya to be legal, although they say he was denied a fair trial.

According to an opinion of an employee of the US Law Library of Congress which was published September 2009 in Forbes, the military's decision to send Zelaya into exile was illegal, but the judicial and legislative branches applied constitutional and statutory law in accordance with the Honduran legal system. This conclusion was disputed by lawmakers, Honduran constitutional law experts, and government officials, who requested that the LLoC report be retracted.

=== Independence of judiciary ===
A lack of an independent, professional judiciary was a factor in the inability of the Honduran government to process Zelaya through a political or criminal trial. The Honduran judiciary remains deeply politicised, with the highest judicial offices still being distributed between the two main parties. Requiring judges to stand for re-election makes them subject to the policies of their sponsoring party. Eight of the judges were selected by the Liberal Party and seven by the National Party. According to a report by Heather Berkman of the University of California. the politicisation of the justice system, including the Supreme Court, the Ministry of Public Security and the Public Ministry, inhibits the due process of law.

José Tomás Arita Valle, who signed the arrest warrant for Zelaya, had been vice-minister for foreign affairs in the National Party government of President Ricardo Maduro. José Antonio Gutiérrez Navas, in 1998, spoke at the UN General Assembly, representing the Liberal Party government of Carlos Roberto Flores, at a session to commemorate fifty years of human rights. Oscar Fernando Chinchilla Banegas and Gustavo Enrique Bustillo Palma were National Party alternate members of Congress (2002–2006).

The US State Department noted in 2004 that the judiciary and Attorney General's office is subject to corruption and political influence.

== Demonstrations surrounding Zelaya's removal ==
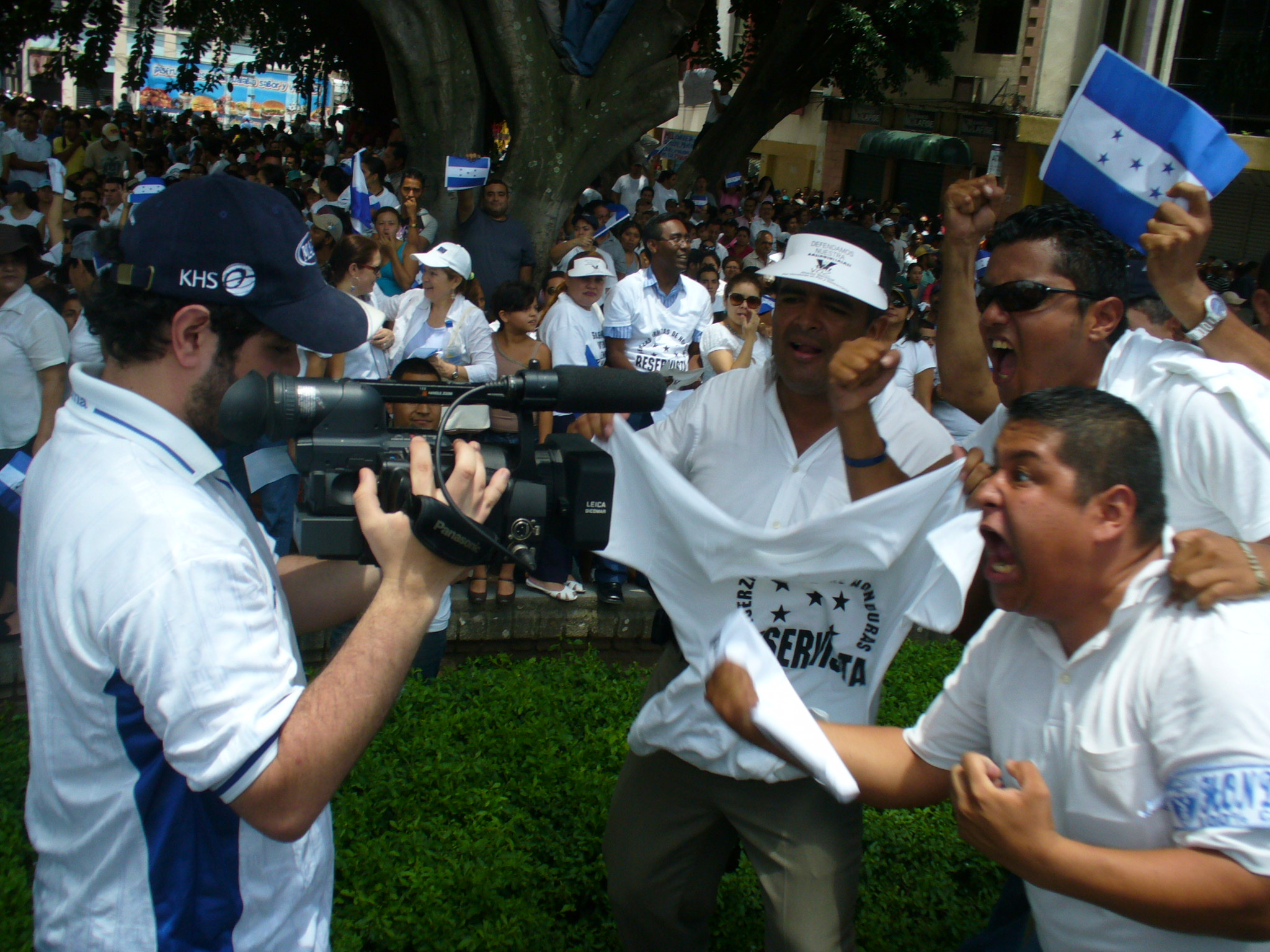
29 June. Demonstrations were held, expressing opposition to Zelaya and Chávez.

In response to the events, a series of demonstrations took place, with some opposing the coup and others supporting it. Several notable demonstrations are listed below:

- On 28 June, in the capital city of Tegucigalpa, hundreds of demonstrators opposing the coup erected roadblocks.
- On 29 June, approximately 2,000 anti-coup demonstrators spent the day in the main square of the city.
- On 30 June, demonstrations in favour of the removal of Zelaya were held. During an emotional speech, Armeda López stated, "Chávez ate Venezuela first, then Bolivia, but that didn't happen in Honduras. We will not allow anyone to rule us here." Protest signs included messages such as "Enough of illegality" and "I love my constitution."
- On 1 July, in the morning, supporters of the coup dressed in white emerged in Tegucigalpa, chanting slogans such as "Mel out, Mel out!" and "Democracy yes, dictatorship no!" The religious sector, women's organizations, politicians, and government officials delivered speeches in support of Zelaya's removal. Jorge Yllescas Olive expressed, "Hondurans have saved our country. Justice is on our side, and we are demonstrating it to the world." Demonstrators also expressed their opposition to Hugo Chávez's threats against Honduras.
- On 3 July, approximately 70,000 people demonstrated in favour of the new government and against Zelaya.
- On 30 July, several thousand individuals marched in El Durazno, Tegucigalpa, to protest against the coup. According to Amnesty International, these protesters were violently dispersed by the police.
- On 22 September, several hundred anti-coup protesters gathered outside the Brazilian embassy, where Zelaya had sought refuge. However, they were dispersed by the police.

Government opponents argue that the pro-coup demonstrations were allegedly orchestrated and financed by the government, citing supporting evidence in certain instances. According to these claims, pro-coup protesters were allegedly transported by buses from various parts of the country to the capital city of Tegucigalpa. Conversely, similar buses carrying anti-coup demonstrators from rural areas were purportedly denied entry into the city.

== Human rights abuses of the interim government ==
De facto President Roberto Micheletti ordered a curfew which initially lasted for the 48 hours from Sunday night (28 June) and to Tuesday (30 June) and has continued since then in an arbitrary way. According to Amnesty International and the International Observation Mission for the Human Rights Situation in Honduras, the curfew law was not published in the official journal La Gaceta and was not approved by Congress.

Originally the curfew ran from 9:00 pm to 6:00 am. That curfew was later revised to be in effect from 10 pm to 5 am, was extended twice, ended on 7 July, and was restarted again on 15 July. Amnesty International and the International Observation Mission stated that curfew implementation was arbitrary, with curfew times announced on radio stations, changing randomly each day and between different regions of Honduras. On 1 July, Congress issued an order (decreto ejecutivo N° 011–2009) at the request of Micheletti suspending four constitutional guarantees during the hours the curfew was in effect. The "state of exception" declared on 1 July is equivalent to a state of siege. It suspended civil liberties including freedom of transit and due process, as well as permitting search and seizure without a warrant.

The ambassadors of Cuba, Venezuela, and Nicaragua on 29 June were detained and beaten by Honduran troops before being released. Venezuela's ambassador to the OAS announced before the OAS that those ambassadors and Patricia Rodas, the Zelaya government's Foreign Minister, had been captured. Minutes later, Armando Laguna, the Venezuelan ambassador in Tegucigalpa, reported that he and the other ambassadors had been freed. Laguna said that he and the other diplomats had been seized when they visited Rodas, and that Rodas was forced into a van and had been transferred to an air base. Venezuelan President Hugo Chávez stated that the Venezuelan ambassador was assaulted by Honduran soldiers and left by the side of a road.

Allies of Zelaya, among them several government officials, were taken into custody by the military. Foreign Minister Patricia Rodas and the mayor of the city San Pedro Sula, Rodolfo Padilla Sunseri, were detained at military bases. According to a Narconews blog, several congressmen of the Democratic Unification Party (PUD) were arrested and the party's presidential candidate, César Ham, went into hiding.

According to the Venezuelan government's ABN news service, Tomás Andino Mencías, a member of the party, reported that PUD lawmakers were led away by the military when they tried to enter the parliament building for 28 June vote on Zelaya's deposal. A dozen former ministers from the Zelaya government went into hiding, some in foreign embassies, fearing arrest. Local media reported that at least eight ministers besides Rodas had been detained.

Hugo Chávez and Cuban Foreign Minister Bruno Rodríguez separately claimed that Honduran Foreign Minister Patricia Rodas was detained by the military. Rodríguez said that the Cuban, Venezuelan and Nicaraguan ambassadors to Honduras had tried but were unable to protect Rodas from a group of masked soldiers who forcibly took her from their grasp. Rodas was sent to Mexico, which offered her asylum and help to resolve the situation.

== Media restrictions ==
Reuters on 29 June 2009, describing the situation in Honduras as a "media blackout", reported that the military had shut down several TV stations, radio stations, and newspapers' websites. Among the TV stations closed were CNN en Español, TeleSUR, and "a pro-Zelaya channel". Reuters said that "the few television and radio stations still operating on Monday [the 29th] played tropical music or aired soap operas and cooking shows", and "made little reference to the demonstrations or international condemnation of the coup". A government health worker interviewed by Reuters said that the anti-Zelaya newspapers El Heraldo and La Tribuna, and "some television channels controlled by the opposition" were the only ones still broadcasting on the morning of the 29th. The Miami Herald reported that the "crackdown on the media" began before dawn on the 28th. It said that only pro-Micheletti stations were allowed to broadcast and that they carried only news friendly to the new government. On 29 June, four Associated Press personnel were detained and removed from their hotel, but then released.

TeleSUR journalist Adriana Sívori, who was in Tegucigalpa reporting the clashes between the police and protesters, reported that she was arrested by the military under threat and that her passport was seized. Her detention was confirmed by the Associated Press. As soon as the international community learned of the detention, and after the quick intervention of the Venezuelan ambassador in Honduras, the journalist and the staff who accompanied her were released.

According to Diario El Tiempo, there was also some information about the developments that the newspaper Diario El Tiempo had been prohibited to broadcast. Canal 11, located in Colonia de Miramontes, was also prohibited from broadcasting information about developments. The Cable Color buildings, which also broadcast programming from CNN and teleSUR, were surrounded by military forces. On 29 June, soldiers shut down Channel 8, a pro-Zelaya government station. Channel 36 was raided by soldiers minutes after the coup and remained off the air for a week; the Miami Herald of 1 July quoted owner Esdras López as saying that the building's occupants were detained during the raid. Channel 66 was raided and went off the air for a short time, but according to some journalists, a Channel 66 program by Eduardo Napoleón Maldonado Macías, a popular pro-Zelaya radio and TV commentator, remained off the air for days. Maldonado went into hiding. The Miami Herald noted that Channel 21's signal was briefly interrupted while it was broadcasting a plea against censorship.

As historian Kevin Coleman wrote, "On Monday 29 June, in a replay of the military raids on the Jesuit radio station in El Progreso of the 1960s and 1970s, the Jesuits' progressive radio broadcasts were abruptly pulled off the air at four in the morning. On Sunday evening at 6 pm, just an hour after the coup government's curfew began, a military contingent broke into Radio Progreso's headquarters. With guns pointed, they shouted: "We've come to close down this piece of ****!" One broadcaster locked himself in to keep broadcasting throughout the night. Shortly after, another military convoy stopped outside Radio Progreso. A group of soldiers approached the radio station's guard and asked him if there were any people still working inside. When the guard said no, the soldier in charge told him: "If we find someone inside, you will regret it". And while the coup government, led by Roberto Micheletti, a native of El Progreso, threatened to shut down the station with violence, popular organisations resisting the undemocratic change in their government criticised the station for "watering down" its reporting of the tense and dynamic situation."

According to a press release published on the website of Radio Globo Honduras, which had long sided with Zelaya, a group of 60 soldiers took the radio off the air and the employees, including Alejandro Villatoro, were allegedly threatened and intimidated. The station was allowed to resume transmission, but staff had to follow some rules which they believed limited freedom of expression. The website of the radio was down but was re-established. Alejandro Villatoro said he was arrested and kidnapped by military forces. On or just before 4 August 2009, the National Telecommunications Commission (CONATEL) terminated Radio Globo's transmission frequency rights.

Honduran newspaper La Prensa reported on 30 June that an armed group of Zelaya supporters attacked its main headquarters by throwing stones and other objects at their windows, until police intervened. According to the paper, it was discovered that the group was led by Venezuelan and Nicaraguan nationals.

The Paris-based press freedom group Reporters Without Borders released a statement on 29 June stating that, "The suspension or closure of local and international broadcast media indicates that the coup leaders want to hide what is happening".

Carlos Lauría of the New York–based Committee to Protect Journalists said: "The de facto government clearly used the security forces to restrict the news... Hondurans did not know what was going on. They clearly acted to create an information vacuum to keep people unaware of what was actually happening". However, in an interview published on 9 July 2009 in The Washington Post, Ramón Custodio López, Honduras's human rights ombudsman, said he had received no official complaints from journalists: "This is the first I have heard about an occupation or military raid of a station", he said. "I try to do the best job I can, but there are things that escape my knowledge".

== Aftermath ==
There were demonstrations supporting and opposing Zelaya's removal from power. The Zelaya administration was investigated and prosecuted in the absence of Zelaya. Some organisations reported human rights violations and media restrictions.

Zelaya made two open attempts to return to the country, which were rebuffed; he eventually returned clandestinely and sought asylum in the Brazilian embassy in Tegucigalpa. Negotiations between the coup government and those seeking Zelaya's restitution continued a rocky path; although both sides signed the San José-Tegucigalpa-Guaymuras Accord both had differing interpretations as to the implications for Zelaya's restitution. Some Hondurans hoped to move past the coup through the elections of 29 November 2009.

The interim government of Honduras hired the Washington DC–based lobbying firm Chlopak, Leonard, Schechter and Associates to improve opinions of policymakers, especially in the US Congress. The firm had represented other governments like Brazil, Colombia, Nicaragua, Georgia, and Serbia. President Obama imposed sanctions against the de facto government for not reinstating Zelaya, despite his ties to Hugo Chavez. Chlopak, Leonard, Schechter and Associates leveraged contacts in Congress, including Sen. Jim DeMint, who opposed sanctions on the new Honduran government.

In June 2019, Zelaya presented in Tegucigalpa a book describing his ouster entitled "El Golpe 28J".

In May 2011, after more than one and a half years in exile in the Dominican Republic, Zelaya was allowed to return to Honduras. Following his return on 28 May, the Organization of American States was to vote on readmitting Honduras to its body.

In July 2011, Honduras's Truth Commission concluded that Zelaya broke the law when he disregarded the Supreme Court ruling ordering him to cancel the referendum, but that his removal from office was deemed illegal and a coup. The commission also ruled that the designation of Roberto Micheletti as interim president by Congress was unconstitutional, and his administration was characterized as a "de facto regime."

As of 2014, the coup had weakened democratic institutions such, that along with corruption and police impunity, state security forces persecuted coup opponents, peasants, indigenous protesters and others, and the crime rate increased massively. In this context more than 13,000 Honduran children crossed U.S. borders from October 2013 until May 2014, a 1272% increase compared to 2009.

That same year, Senate Armed Services Committee Chair Carl Levin asked the U.S. Defense Department Office of the Inspector General to investigate charges that the William Perry Center for Hemispheric Defense Studies, the educational arm of U.S. Southern Command located at the National Defense University in Washington, D.C., had actively promoted the coup declared illegal by President Obama but remained unpunished.

Following the coup, trends of decreasing poverty were reversed. The nation saw a poverty increase of 13.2 percent and in extreme poverty of 26.3 percent in just 3 years. Furthermore, unemployment grew between 2008 and 2012 from 6.8 percent to 14.1 percent.

In 2021, Zelaya's wife Xiomara Castro de Zelaya, who ran for president in two previous Honduras elections, would be elected as Honduras' first female President. However, by this point in time, the Zelayas were no longer members of the Liberal Party of Honduras and had since formed a separate party called the Liberty and Refoundation party, or LIBRE.

== Documents on US role ==
The US Congressional Research Service, a non-partisan congressional committee, found the interpretation and application of the Honduran constitution that led to the removal of Jose Manuel Zelaya Rosales to be legal.

Emails released later show that the 2009 removal was supported by Hillary Clinton's State Department by not recognizing it as coup in order to maintain U.S. aid to the Honduran people. Clinton and her team worked behind the scenes to stall military and economic efforts by neighbouring countries through the Organization of American States to restore Manuel Zelaya to office. "The OAS meeting today turned into a non-event — just as we hoped," wrote one senior State Department official, celebrating their success in defusing what they judged would have been a violent or destabilizing restoration. Secretary Clinton helped organize elections where Zelaya would be excluded. In her own words, she "strategized on a plan to restore order in Honduras and ensure that free and fair elections could be held quickly and legitimately, which would render the question of Zelaya moot".

== See also ==
- Chronology of the 2009 Honduran constitutional crisis
- Murder of Vicky Hernández - which took place during the event
