= Peter Schechter =

American political consultant

- Born: 1959 (age 66–67); Rome, Italy
- Education: Paul H. Nitze School of Advanced International Studies; Johns Hopkins University
- Occupations: Consultant; author; think tank executive
- Title: Executive Producer and Host of Altamar, A Foreign Policy Podcast
- Spouse: Rosa Puech
- Children: Alia, Marina
- Website: www.altamar.us

Peter Schechter (born 1959) is an American political consultant and the executive producer and host of Altamar, a foreign policy podcast. Until June 2017, he was the Atlantic Council's Senior Vice President for Strategic Initiatives and the founding director of the Adrienne Arsht Latin America Center, a Washington-based think tank launched in October 2013 to study the trends transforming Latin America.

Born in 1959 in Rome, Schechter first came to the US when he was 16, then spent several years in Bolivia and Venezuela before returning to the US to settle in Washington. He has a Master's from the Johns Hopkins’ Paul H. Nitze School of Advanced International Studies. He is fluent in six languages.

== Biography ==
Schechter spent a significant portion of his professional career providing guidance to political candidates in Latin America, such as Henrique Capriles from Venezuela, Alvaro Uribe from Colombia, and Fernando Henrique Cardoso from Brazil.

From 1987 to 1992, Schechter worked as a political consultant for a public relations firm, The Sawyer Miller Group, where he led their international division. In 1991, he and Bob Chlopak were credited with helping Barco Vargas of Columbia get elected. In 1993, he co-founded Chlopak, Leonard, Schechter and Associates, a Washington, DC–based public relations company with partners Bob Chlopak and Charlie Leonard.

According to Foreign Agents Registration filings with the US Department of Justice, the firm received over $292,000 in 2009 to boost the image of the interim government of Honduras in the US after the ousting of President Manuel Zelaya. The contract was signed by Schechter. The firm's lobbyists interacted with members of the US Congress, including Senator Jim DeMint, who became a supporter the interim government, later expressing his support to the Wall Street Journal and Fox News. The Obama administration stated that they saw the coup in Honduras as a dangerous development in the region. Chlopak, Leonard, Schechter and Associates received negative publicity in the US and Honduras for their involvement and a protest was held outside of their Washington DC office.

In 2013, The Atlantic council launched its Adrienne Arsht Latin America Center. Peter Schechter was chosen to be their founding director due to his experience in the region. He also served as the Atlantic Council's Senior Vice President for Strategic Initiatives until June 2017.

Schechter is an adjunct professor at George Washington University in DC and a visiting professor at Ben Gurion University’s Faculty of Business and Management. He also serves on BGU's Board of Directors

He was on the board for Jose’ Andres's ThinkFoodGroup, which includes more than 30 restaurants across the US Schechter opened his own restaurant, Immigrant Food, with Ezequiel Vazquez-Ger in 2019. The restaurant is located a block away from the White House in Washington DC. Immigrant food hosts virtual events and produces a monthly digital publication called "The Think Tank," which focuses on complex immigration issues.

Schechter is also an author. He published his first novel, Point of Entry, in 2006. which received accolades from The Washington Post, The Chicago Tribune, The Boston Globe, and Newsweek. He published his second novel, Pipeline, in 2009.
