= Tomás Arita Valle =

Honduran judge

José Tomás Arita Valle (4 September 1948) was born in Ocotepeque, Honduras. He is the deputy chairman of the Supreme Court of Honduras.

He was appointed to the Supreme Court in 2002. He was vice minister for foreign affairs in the National Party government of President Ricardo Maduro. He previously sat on the Rector's Advisory Board of the National Autonomous University of Honduras and was a member of the Boundary Commission between Honduras and El Salvador. He was re-elected by the Parliament at the end of January in 2009 to the Supreme Court of Honduras.

As part of the 2009 Honduran constitutional crisis against the elected president Manuel Zelaya Arita signed a secret arrest warrant. At the end of July 2009 the U.S. government under Barack Obama annulled his visa to enter the United States
