= Interdisciplinary Group of Independent Experts =

The Interdisciplinary Group of Independent Experts (Grupo Interdisciplinario de Expertos Independientes, GIEI) is the title shared by a series of committees of human rights experts appointed by the Inter-American Commission of Human Rights to investigate particular incidents or scenarios of human rights violations.

The instances of the Group so far are:

- Interdisciplinary Group of Independent Experts for the Ayotzinapa Case
- Interdisciplinary Group of Independent Experts for Nicaragua, created July 2018
- Interdisciplinary Group of Independent Experts for Bolivia, examining human rights abuses during the Bolivian political crisis from September to December 2019

In July 2017, a study was published explaining how at least 19 experts were infected by Israeli spyware Pegasus whilst investigating the mass disappearance of 43 mexican students in Iguala, the largest human rights scandal in modern Mexican history. The infection took place during 2016.

== Ayotzinapa case ==
The Interdisciplinary Group of Independent Experts (Grupo Interdisciplinario de Expertos Independientes, GIEI) is a committee of jurists and doctors created by the Inter-American Commission on Human Rights to carry out a parallel investigation of the abduction and disappearance of 43 students from the Ayotzinapa Rural Teachers' College in Iguala, Guerrero, Mexico. The group was established in 2014 and issued two reports by 2016. It was reactivated in 2020.

Legal scholars described the Group as "the first experience of international monitoring carried out within a criminal investigation process of its kind. It can be replicated and contribute to the investigation of emblematic cases and regional settings where processes of mass victimisation have occurred."
