= 1701 Pennsylvania Avenue =

Coordinates: 38.8992°N 77.04°W

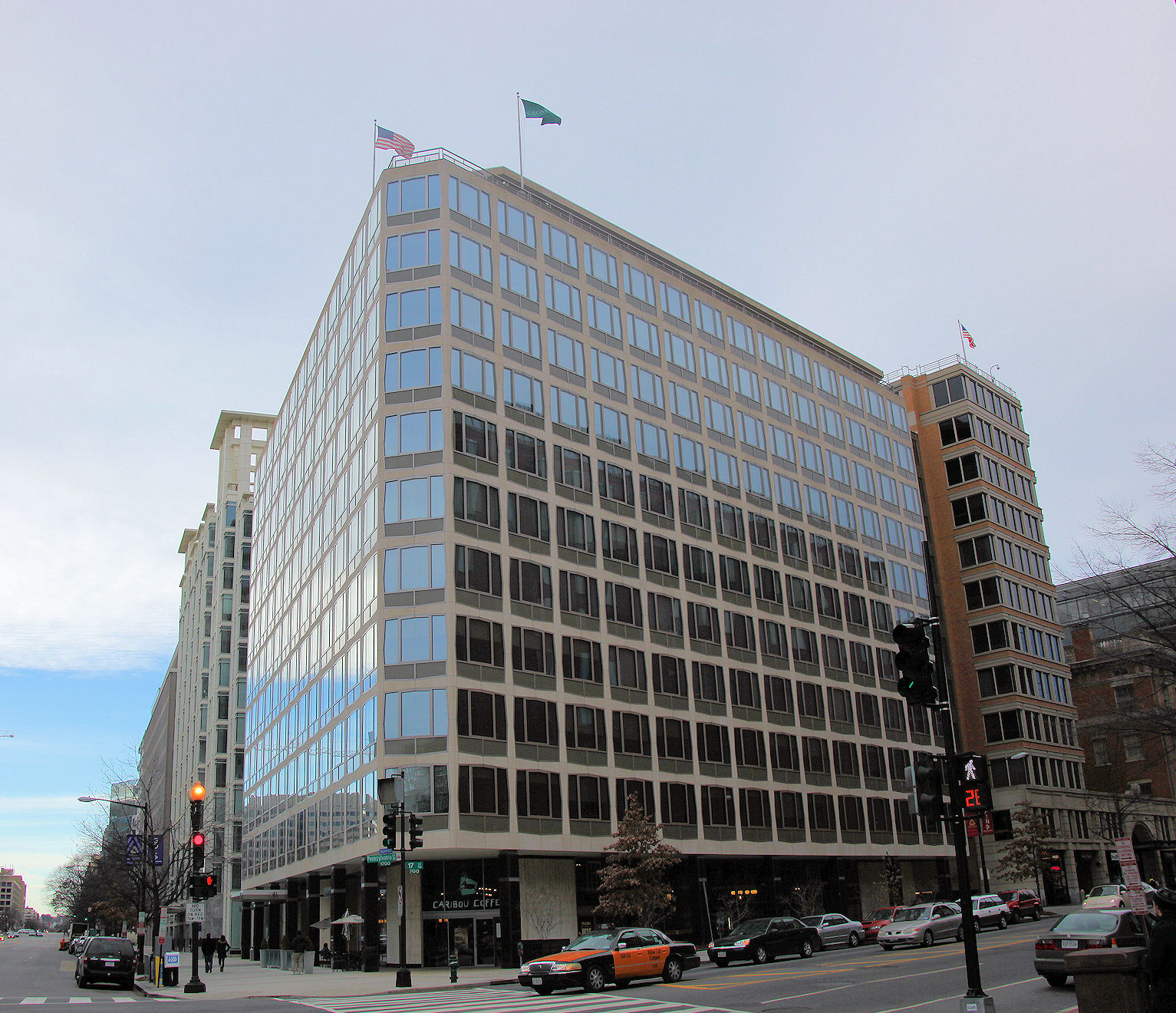

General information
- Status: Completed
- Type: Office
- Location: Washington, D.C., United States
- Completed: 1962

Height
- Roof: 153 feet (47 m)

Technical details
- Floor count: 13

1701 Pennsylvania Avenue is a high-rise office building in Downtown Washington, D.C., United States. Construction of the building was completed in 1962. The building rises to 153 feet (47 m), with 13 floors. The architect of the recent renovation of the building was Fox Architects, Inc. The building serves as an office building for Washington. The building also hosts the embassy for the Republic of Palau.

== See also ==
- List of tallest buildings in Washington, D.C.
